= List of medical schools in Thailand =

Medical education in Thailand was pioneered by King Chulalongkorn, who founded the country's first medical school called the "School of Medical Practitioners" at Siriraj Hospital in 1889, now the Faculty of Medicine Siriraj Hospital, Mahidol University. There are now 23 institutions offering medical programs nationwide, most of them public. All medical schools in Thailand award a Doctor of Medicine (MD) degree, equivalent to a master's degree in Thailand. Most of these schools also provide postgraduate and specialist programs. The Medical Council of Thailand (TMC) is responsible for verifying all curricula.

Almost all public medical school students are under contract to work under the national internship program, set up by the TMC after graduation. In cooperation with the Ministry of Public Health (MOPH), medical school students are required to work under the national internship program for three years. The TMC states the program's purpose is to improve the quality of healthcare services, reduce the service inequality between Bangkok and the remaining 76 provinces and increase the medical skills of young graduates. Residency training in Thailand requires participation in the national internship program.

== Public ==
- Faculty of Medicine, Burapha University
- Faculty of Medicine, Chiang Mai University
- Faculty of Medicine, Chulalongkorn University
- Faculty of Medicine and Public Health, HRH Princess Chulabhorn College of Medical Science, Chulabhorn Royal Academy (PC)
- Faculty of Medicine, Kasetsart University
- Faculty of Medicine, Khon Kaen University
- Faculty of Medicine, King Mongkut's Institute of Technology Ladkrabang
- School of Medicine, Mae Fah Luang University
- Faculty of Medicine, Mahasarakham University
- Mahidol University

- Faculty of Medicine Siriraj Hospital (SI)
- Faculty of Medicine Ramathibodi Hospital (RA)
- Collaborative Project to Increase Production of Rural Doctor, Mahidol University (MOPH-Mahidol CPIRD/PI) (affiliated program)

- Maharat Nakhon Ratchasima Hospital
- Sawanpracharak Hospital
- Maharaj Nakhon Si Thammarat Hospital
- Ratchaburi Hospital

- Phramongkutklao College of Medicine (PCM)
- Faculty of Medicine, Naresuan University
- Faculty of Medicine Vajira Hospital, Navamindradhiraj University (BM)
  - Vajira Hospital
  - Taksin Hospital
- School of Medicine, University of Phayao
- Faculty of Medicine, Prince of Songkla University
- Faculty of Medicine, Princess of Naradhiwas University
- Srinakharinwirot University
  - Faculty of Medicine, Srinakharinwirot University
  - Joint Medical Programme Srinakharinwirot University and the University of Nottingham
- Institute of Medicine, Suranaree University of Technology
- Thammasat University
  - Faculty of Medicine, Thammasat University
  - Chulabhorn International College of Medicine (CICM), Thammasat University
- College of Medicine and Public Health, Ubon Ratchathani University
- School of Medicine, Walailak University

== Private ==
- College of Medicine, Rangsit University
  - Lerdsin Hospital
  - Nopparat Rajathanee Hospital
  - Rajavithi Hospital
- School of Medicine, Siam University
- Faculty of Medicine, Bangkokthonburi University
- Faculty of Medicine, Western University

== See also ==
- Health in Thailand
