= Collaborative Project to Increase Production of Rural Doctor, Mahidol University =

MOPH-Mahidol Collaborative Project to Increase Production of Rural Doctor
- โครงการร่วมผลิตแพทย์เพิ่มเพื่อชาวชนบท กระทรวงสาธารณสุข สถาบันสมทบมหาวิทยาลัยมหิดล
- Former names: Praboromarajchanok Institute
- Type: Public
- Established: 1997
- Parent institution: Ministry of Public Health
- Affiliations: Faculty of Medicine Siriraj Hospital; Faculty of Medicine Ramathibodi Hospital; Mahidol University
- Location: Nakhon Ratchasima Province; Nakhon Si Thammarat Province; Nakhon Sawan Province; Ratchaburi Province
- Colors: Green
- Website: http://www.cpird.in.th

Ministry of Public Health (MOPH)-Mahidol University's Collaborative Project to Increase Production of Rural Doctor (CPIRD) (Thai: โครงการร่วมผลิตแพทย์เพิ่มเพื่อชาวชนบท กระทรวงสาธารณสุข สถาบันสมทบมหาวิทยาลัยมหิดล), or previously named the Praboromarajchanok Institute until 2019, is the 13th medical program established in Thailand, and was founded in 1997. The project runs in the collaboration between Ministry of Public Health and Mahidol University which consists of a collection of Medical Education Centers (MEC) (Thai: ศูนย์แพทยศาสตรศึกษาชั้นคลินิก). The university approved 4 hospitals as teaching affiliates in this project, and offers only the Doctor of Medicine program (M.D.), which produces around 132 medical doctors annually. The old abbreviation of PI from Praboromarajchanok Institute remains in use.

== History ==
In 1992, the Cabinet decided that Thailand health system needed more medical doctors especially in rural areas. Due to the urgent need to produce more rural medical doctors, the Cabinet approved the Ministry of Public Health and the Ministry of Education to set up a new model of medical education in the rural areas of Thailand called the "Collaborative Project to Increase Production of Rural Doctor (CPIRD)" in 1994, responsible by Praboromarajchanok Institute. This was subsequently changed to "Office of Administration for Collaborative Project to Increase Production of Rural Doctor" in 1997.

The official agreement between the Ministry of Public Health and Mahidol University was signed in 1997 with its publication in the Government Gazette on September 14, 1999. Mahidol University approved 4 Hospitals as teaching affiliates in this project:

- Maharat Nakhon Ratchasima Hospital, Nakhon Ratchasima Province
- Maharaj Nakhon Si Thammarat Hospital, Nakhon Si Thammarat Province
- Sawanpracharak Hospital, Nakhon Sawan Province
- Ratchaburi Hospital, Ratchaburi Province

The first batch of 16 medical students from Maharat Nakhon Ratchasima Hospital began their education in 1997. The initial groups of students started studying at Sawanpracharak Hospital, Maharaj Nakhon Si Thammarat Hospital, and Ratchaburi Hospital in 1999.

== Education ==
The program offers one undergraduate program: the Doctor of Medicine program (M.D.) - PIMD/B. Students are separated into 2 main groups: Maharat Nakhon Ratchasima Hospital, Maharaj Nakhon Si Thammarat Hospital and Sawanpracharak Hospital as one cohort, abbreviated PI and Ratchaburi Hospital as another, abbreviated (PI* or PIRB). PI medical students study alongside medical students of the Faculty of Medicine Ramathibodi Hospital, Mahidol University and HRH Princess Chulabhorn College of Medical Science. PI* medical students study alongside medical students of the Faculty of Medicine Siriraj Hospital, Mahidol University. Both cohorts study the first year which consists of basic sciences at the Salaya Campus. However, in the preclinical second and third year, PI students study at the Faculty of Science, Mahidol University, while PI* students study at the Siriraj Campus. For the clinical 4th-6th year, students will continue studying at their respective CPIRD Medical Education Center outside Bangkok.

== See also ==
- Health in Thailand
- Hospitals in Thailand
- Mahidol University
