= Mahidol University =

Public university in Nakhon Pathom, Thailand

Coordinates: 13°47′36″N 100°19′21″E

- มหาวิทยาลัยมหิดล
- "The Great Crown of Victory of The Prince of Songkla"; Mahidol University Seal
- Former name: University of medical sciences
- Motto: Attānaṃ upamaṃ kare (in Pali)
- Motto in English: Do unto others as you would have others do unto you
- Type: Research university, Autonomous public university
- Established: 2 February 1943; 83 years ago
- Founder: Plaek Pibunsongkram
- Affiliations: ASAIHL; AUN; AALAU
- Chairman: Piyasakol Sakolsatayadorn, M.D.
- President: Piyamitr Sritara, M.D.
- Royal conferrer: Maha Chakri Sirindhorn, Princess Royal of Thailand on behalf of the King
- Students: 32,675 (2015 academic year)
- Location: Salaya; Phaya Thai; Bangkok Noi; Kanchanaburi; Nakhon Sawan; Amnat Charoen
- Campus: Urban and rural (varies by campus)
- Colors: Dark blue
- Website: www.mahidol.ac.th

Mahidol University is an autonomous public research university in Thailand. The university was founded as part of Siriraj Hospital in 1888. It was first called the University of Medical Science in 1943, and has been recognized as Thailand's fourth public university. The university was renamed in 1969 by King Bhumibol Adulyadej for his father, Mahidol Adulyadej, known as the "Father of Modern Medicine and Public Health in Thailand".

Originally focused on the health sciences, it has expanded into other fields. The university hosted Thailand's first medical school, Siriraj Medical School. Mahidol offers a range of graduate (primarily international) and undergraduate programs, from the natural sciences to the liberal arts, with remote campuses in Kanchanaburi, Nakhon Sawan, and Amnat Charoen provinces. There are a total of 629 programs in 17 faculties, six colleges, nine research institutions and six campuses. The university has the largest budget of any public university in Thailand: $430 million in 2019, most of which is for graduate research programs. Mahidol had an acceptance rate of 0.4 percent in medicine for the 2016 academic year, and was ranked Thailand's number-one university in 2011 by QS Asian University Rankings.

== History ==
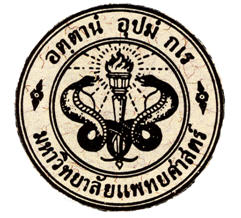
University of Medical Sciences logo

The first Thai medical school, Bhatayakorn School (Thai: โรงเรียนแพทยากร), was founded with a royal decree by King Chulalongkorn in 1888. At the former palace (the present-day Bangkok Noi campus at Siriraj Hospital), the school offered a three-year medical certification course. After a visit by King Chulalongkorn and Queen Saovabha Phongsri, it was renamed the Royal Medical College (Thai: ราชแพทยาลัย). The school was merged with Chulalongkorn University in Vajiravudh's 6 April 1917 decree as the Faculty of Medicine of Chulalongkorn University (now the Faculty of Medicine Siriraj Hospital, Mahidol University).

The government of Plaek Phibunsongkhram then separated the Faculty of Medicine (Siriraj Medical School) departments of dentistry, pharmacy, and veterinary science from Chulalongkorn University and re-organized them as the University of Medical Sciences (Thai: มหาวิทยาลัยแพทยศาสตร์). Founded on 2 February 1943, it has added schools and departments. In 1959, the Medical Science Preparatory School (the present-day Faculty of Science) was moved to Phaya Thai District and became the Phaya Thai campus. During the 1960s, the university focused its development on that campus. In 1965, another medical school (the Faculty of Medicine of Ramathibodi Hospital) was established at Phaya Thai. The first medical school outside Bangkok was the Faculty of Medicine Nakorn Chiang Mai Hospital in Chiang Mai Province until 1964, when it was transferred to Chiang Mai University. Before being transferred In 1968, the university established pharmacy and dentistry schools at a new campus separate from Chulalongkorn University. King Bhumibol Adulyadej changed the school's name to Mahidol University (Thai: มหาวิทยาลัยมหิดล) on 21 February 1969 in honor of his father, Prince Mahidol of Songkla. The university bought a large suburban area, known as Salaya, in 1971 for future development. During the following years, the former faculties of dentistry and pharmacy were returned to Chulalongkorn University.

King Bhumibol wanted Mahidol University to expand into the social sciences, and the Faculty of Social Sciences and Humanities was founded in 1969. Construction of the Salaya campus began in 1975, but was delayed due to the political situation and financial constraints. The campus was opened on 23 July 1983, and all education for freshman-year students was moved there. Later development of the university, centered on the Salaya campus, diverged from the health sciences to meet Thailand's academic demands. The country's first internship college was founded at Mahidol in 1986. Ratchasuda College, devoted to the disabled, was established in 1999. Athasit Vejjajiva, the father of former prime minister Abhisit Vejjajiva, was president of Mahidol from 1995 to 1999.

The university expanded to Kanchanaburi in 2002 to offer students more learning opportunities in rural communities. It expanded to Nakhon Sawan in 2004, accepting the first class of management students in 2004 and the first class of arts students in 2005. The university began construction of the Amnat Charoen Campus, which was completed in 2009.

MU is part of the Association of Southeast Asian Institutions of Higher Learning (ASAIHL) and is a national research university, designated by the Ministry of Education under Prime Minister Abhisit Vejjajiva. In 2009, MU joined the ASEAN University Network (AUN).

== Rankings and reputation ==
University rankings

Global – Overall
- ARWU World: 601–700 (2023)
- QS World: =358 (2026)
- THE World: 601–800 (2024)
- USNWR Global: =512 (2023)

MU entered the QS World University Rankings in 2006 as 322nd in the world and third in Thailand. According to Quacquarelli Symonds' 2010 Asian ranking, MU was 228th in the world, 28th in Asia, and Thailand's top university.

Mahidol University International College (MUIC), Thailand's first international college, offers a range of international undergraduate and graduate programs. Its newest division is Fine and Applied Arts, which houses the Entertainment Media Program (EMP) and the Communication Design Program (CDP). Both programs offer a Bachelor of Arts degree, and EMP has three majors: film, TV, and animation.

In 2009, MU was selected as one of Thailand's national research universities by the Ministry of Education's Office of Higher Education Commission. The government implemented an emergency policy to develop the national research university to an international standard to promote Thailand as a hub of Asian education, research and development, and the Office of Higher Education Commission organized the National Research University Initiative and Research Promotion. The cabinet resolved in May 2009 to approve the project with a budget of about $350 million for the three-year, 2010-2012 fiscal-year period.

The University Ranking by Academic Performance (URAP) ranked MU as Thailand's best university and number 34 in Asia in 2010, but it dropped to number 351 in the world. In the 2019 Times Higher Education World University Rankings (THE), Mahidol was Thailand's top university and number 97 on the list. In 2019, Mae Fah Luang University and Mahidol University were the leading Thai tertiary institutions. According to the 2023 THE, MU was between 801 and 1,000th on its list.

== Academic structure ==
The university has 17 faculties, six colleges, nine research institutes and six campuses (three provincial campuses), and offers a range of academic programs in three core areas: health sciences, science and technology, and social sciences and humanities. Over 70 centers and laboratories for specialized research fields use interdisciplinary and inter-institutional approaches to research and postgraduate training to meet the present and future needs of government and industry. The Mahidol University Applied and Technological Service Center serves the public and private sectors and supports research.

The university has two faculties of medicine which operate five hospitals, an institute of medicine affiliated with four hospitals (with Medical Education Centers for the Collaborative Project to Increase Production of Rural Doctors), and trains medical students for two other colleges of medicine. This produces about 850 medical doctors annually, with centers for comprehensive, specialized medical training and patient care; about 4,250 beds serve nearly 4.4 million outpatients and 120,000 in-patients per year.

The Bangkok School of Tropical Medicine, the educational arm of the Faculty of Tropical Medicine, offers postgraduate programs from the graduate-diploma to doctoral level. The school is accredited by the American Society of Tropical Medicine and Hygiene as one of eight schools in the world offering a diploma in tropical medicine, and the only school in which students can learn about tropical diseases in the tropics. The faculty operates the Hospital for Tropical Diseases. A dental unit at the Faculty of Dentistry and the Golden Jubilee Medical Center at Salaya serves about 340,000 patients a year.

Mahidol University Library and Information Center (MULIC) contains an automated library system with cyber-linked branches on MU's campuses; over 1,100,000 books, theses, research reports, and bound journals; 1,200 printed journals, 15,000 electronic journals and 16,000 electronic books; 13,000 audiovisual materials; hundreds of computer terminals and multimedia viewing equipment, and online reference services, multi-database searching and document-delivery services.

The Mahidol University Computing Network (MUC-Net) accommodates at least 500 local area networks, interconnecting over 350 servers and 10,000 terminals and PCs in all departments throughout the university; advanced, networked computer systems; multicast and broadcast data transmission for video conferences, distance learning, e-Learning, and IP-TV applications.

Digital services include the Mahidol University Library and Information Center Network (MULINET), the Mahidol University Intranet; MUC-Net; an intra-phone, IP-phone, wireless campus network; multi-media, distance-learning and video-conferencing facilities; a management information system (MIS), and the Center for Administrative Information System (MU-ADMIN-IS).

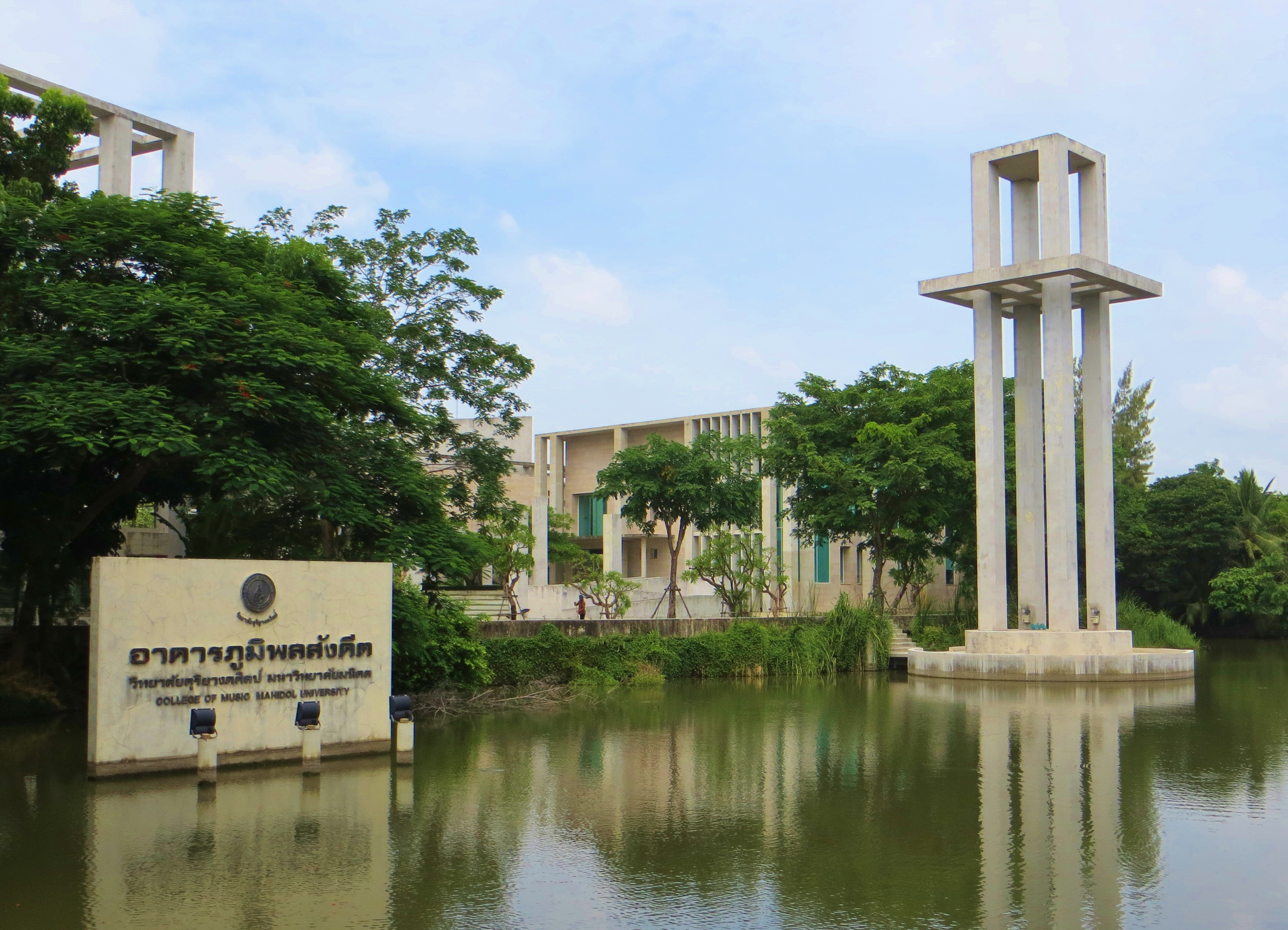
College of Music, Salaya campus

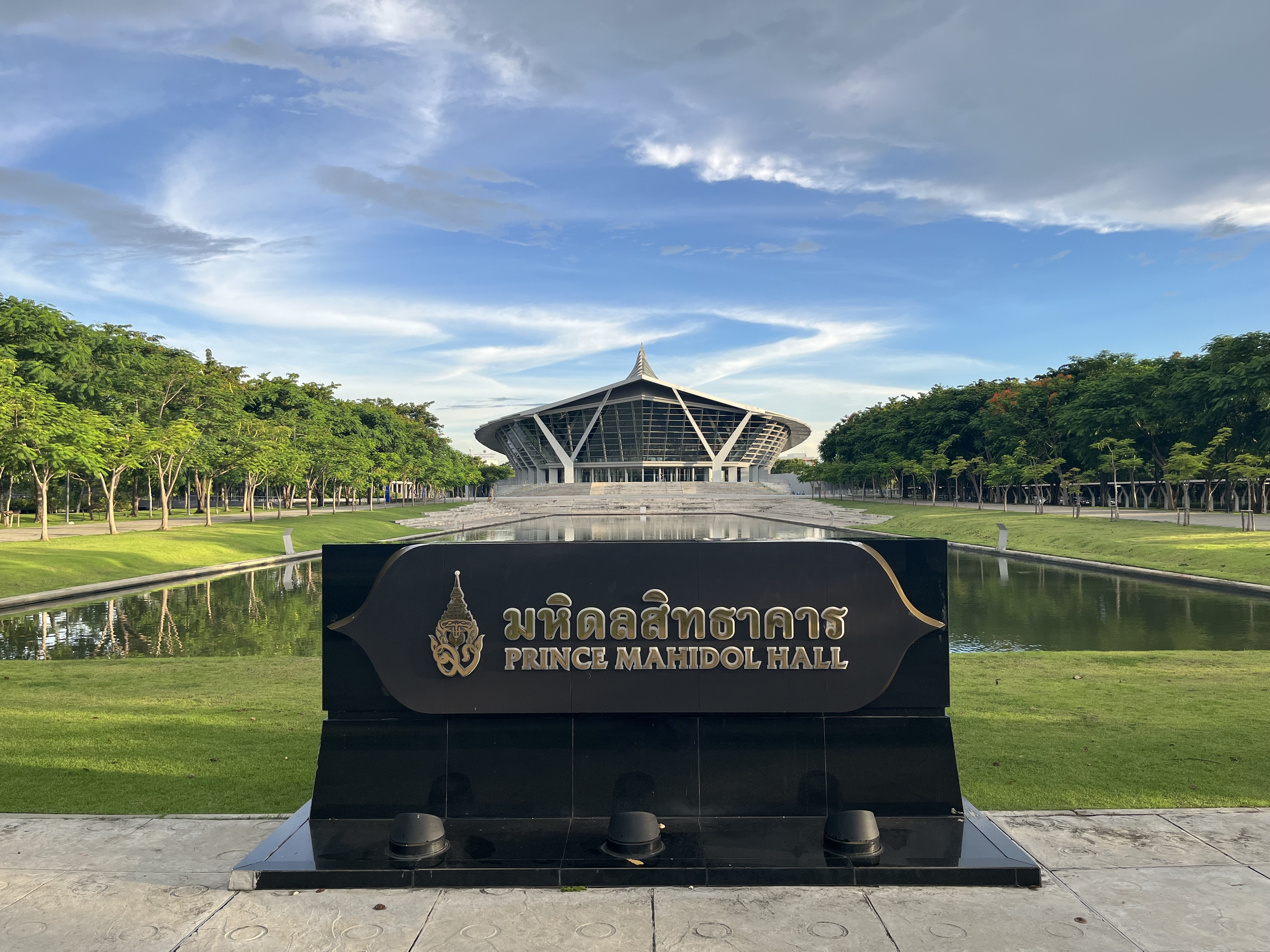
Prince Mahidol Hall in 2022

The multi-purpose, 2,000-seat Prince Mahidol Hall, on the Salaya campus, was completed in 2014 and is used for graduation ceremonies, music performances and conferences. It is the main concert hall for the Thailand Philharmonic Orchestra (TPO).

=== Managed by MU ===
- Faculties:
  - Faculty of Dentistry
  - Faculty of Engineering
  - Faculty of Environment and Resource Studies
  - Faculty of Graduate Studies
  - Faculty of Information Communication and Technology
  - Faculty of Liberal Arts
  - Faculty of Medical Technology
  - Faculty of Medicine Ramathibodi Hospital
  - Faculty of Medicine Siriraj Hospital
  - Faculty of Nursing
  - Faculty of Pharmacy
  - Faculty of Physical Therapy
  - Faculty of Public Health
  - Faculty of Science
  - Faculty of Social Sciences and Humanities
  - Faculty of Tropical Medicine
  - Faculty of Veterinary Medicine
- Colleges:
  - College of Management
  - College of Music
  - College of Religious Studies
  - Mahidol University International College (MUIC)
  - Research Institute for Languages and Cultures of Asia (RILCA)

=== Affiliates ===
- Phramongkutklao College of Medicine
- HRH Princess Chulabhorn College of Medical Science
- Collaborative Project to Increase Production of Rural Doctor (CPIRD):
  - Maharat Nakhon Ratchasima Hospital Medical Education Center
  - Maharaj Nakhon Si Thammarat Hospital Medical Education Center
  - Sawanpracharak Hospital Medical Education Center
  - Ratchaburi Hospital Medical Education Center

=== Former affiliates ===
- Faculty of Medicine Vajira Hospital, Navamindradhiraj University
- Kuakarun Faculty of Nursing, Navamindradhiraj University
- Praboromarajchanok Institute

== Campuses ==
MU has several campuses in Bangkok, Thailand's capital: a suburban campus, two older, inner-city campuses, and a downtown high-rise office site for the College of Management. The university also has provincial campuses in Kanchanaburi, Nakhon Sawan and Amnat Charoen provinces.

=== Bangkok Noi ===
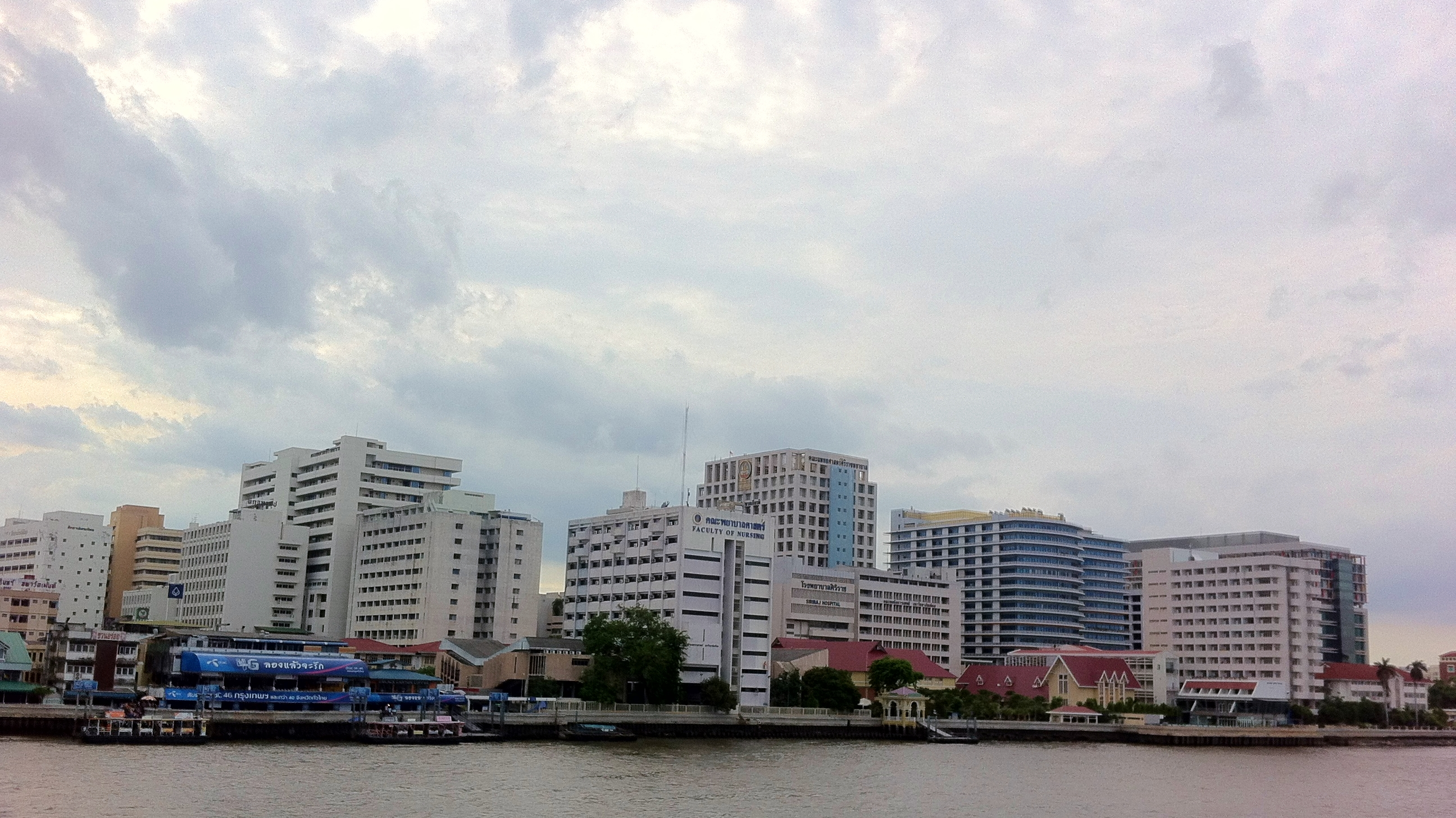
Siriraj Hospital, Bangkok Noi campus

The former Rear Palace, divided for Siriraj Hospital, is MU's Bangkok Noi campus. The campus extended into the districts of Bangkok Noi and Bang Phlat, and houses the Faculty of Medicine Siriraj Hospital, and the Faculties of Nursing, Medical Technology, and Physical Therapy and Applied Movement Science. It has personal and recreational facilities such as dormitories, cafeterias and sporting facilities.

=== Phaya Thai ===
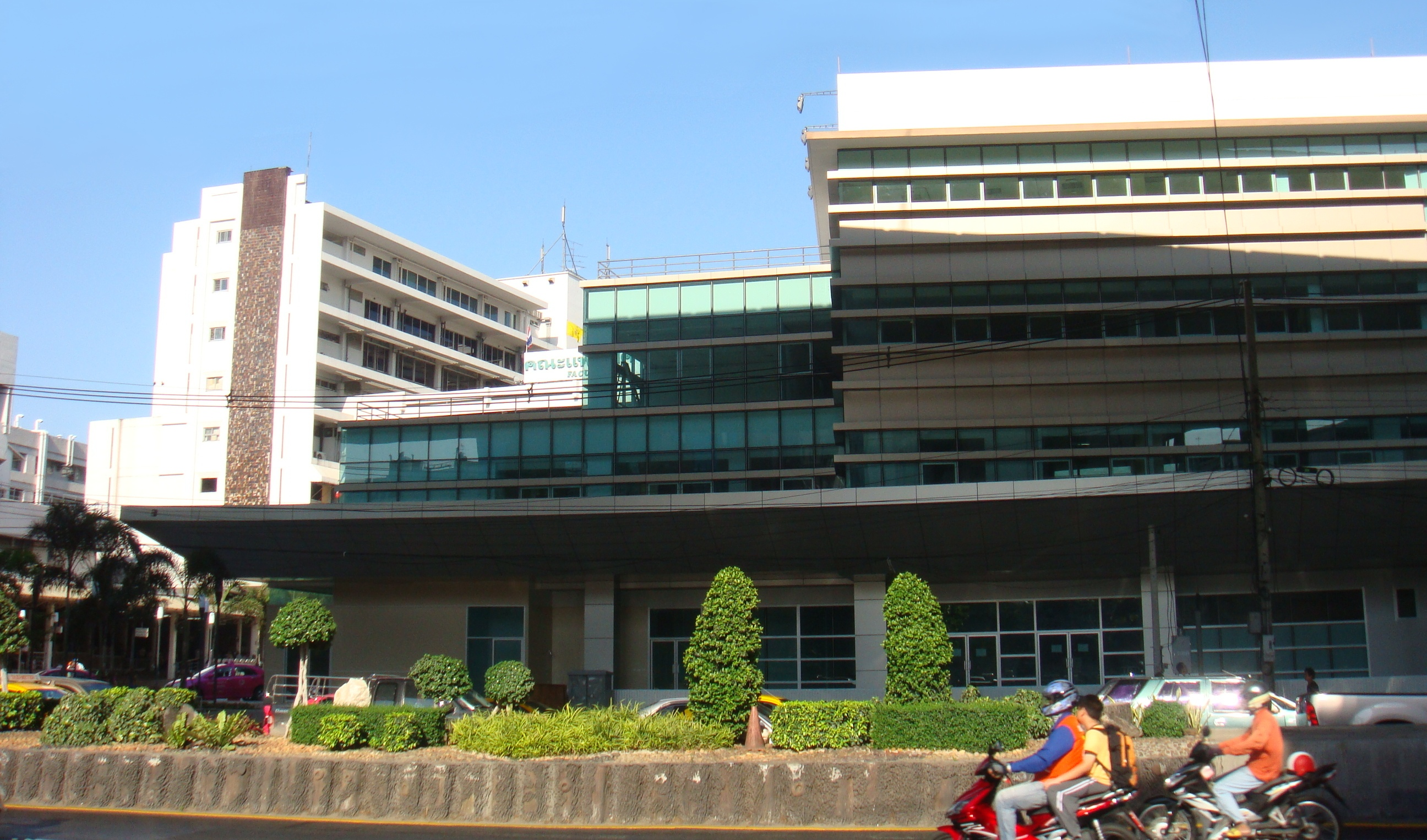
Ramathibodi Hospital, Phaya Thai campus

The urban, 78-acre (32 ha) campus covers three linked areas in central Bangkok and houses Ramathibodi Hospital and the Hospital for Tropical Diseases, with the university's focus on medicine and the sciences at the Faculty of Medicine Ramathibodi Hospital and the Faculties of Dentistry, Pharmacy, Public Health, Tropical Medicine, and Science. It also houses the Institute for Innovation and Development of Learning Process, the National Doping Control Center and the Mahidol University Computing Center, supporting facilities, and student accommodations.

=== Salaya ===
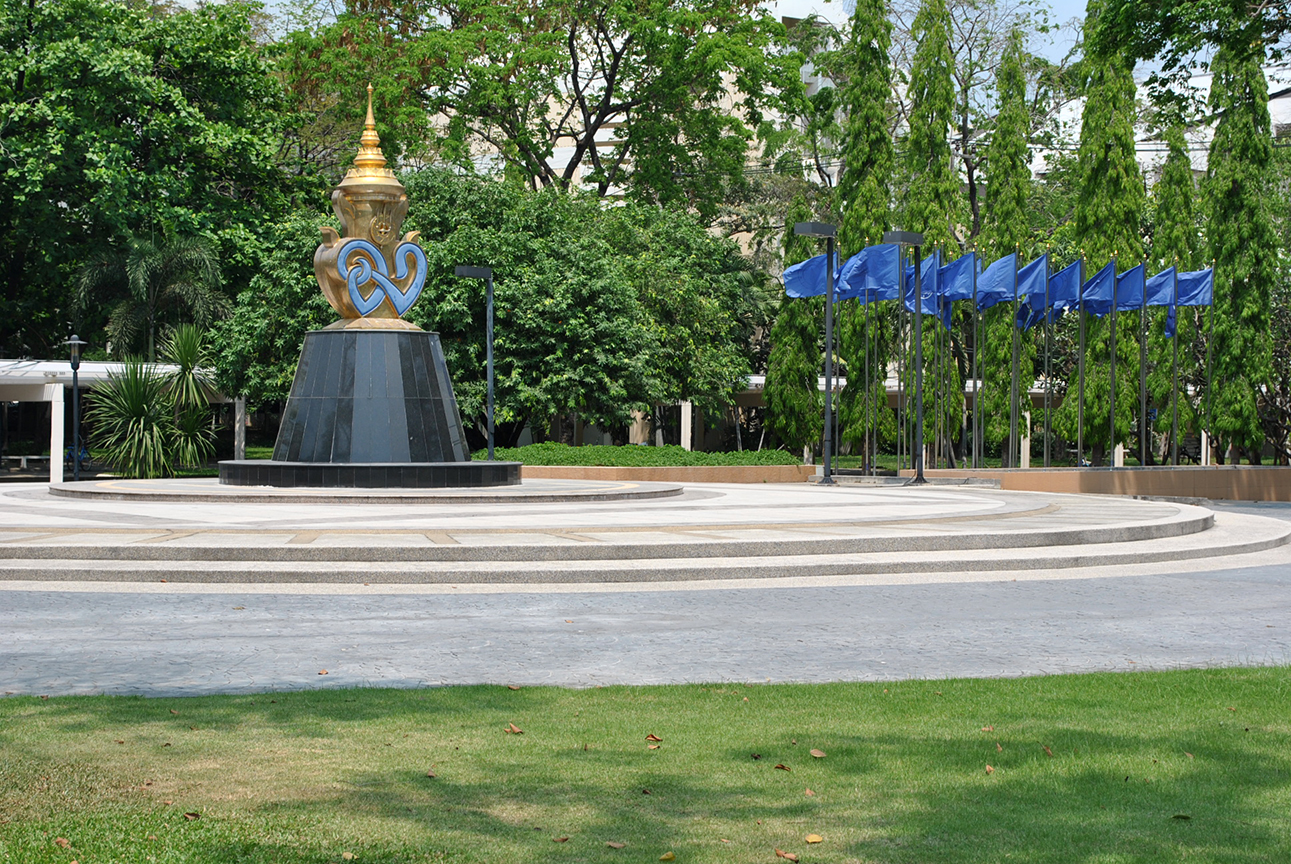
Salaya campus courtyard

The suburban Salaya campus covers 520 acres (210 ha) of semi-rural land in Nakhon Pathom Province, within easy reach of central Bangkok. It is currently the main campus, housing most academic and research departments and supporting facilities including the office of the president, the central and multiple faculty libraries, science and computer laboratories, indoor stadiums, a sports complex, the Student Union, shops, cafeterias, student dormitories and condominiums. The main auditorium and the largest concert hall in Thailand, Prince Mahidol Hall is also located on this campus.

=== Vipawadee ===
The downtown, high-rise campus houses the College of Management (usually abbreviated CMMU). It offers graduate programs in management at the Master's, post-Master's and Ph.D. levels. Facilities include a library, computer labs, study rooms, cafeteria, shops and a gym.

=== Bang Phli ===
The Chakri Naruebodindra Medical Institute (CNMI), part of the Faculty of Medicine Ramathibodi Hospital, is in the Bang Phli District of Samut Prakan Province. The institute consists of the 400-bed Ramathibodi Chakri Naruebodindra Hospital, a community building, the Queen Sirikit Learning and Research Centre, student and staff dormitories, and a recreation building.

=== Provincial campuses ===
The Kanchanaburi Campus, situated at Moo.9 Lum Sum Sub-district, Saiyok District, Kanchanaburi Province, spans an extensive area of 10 square kilometers, positioned adjacent to National Highway No. 323 (Kanchanaburi-Thong Pha Phum). Its origin traces back to 1995 when the Cabinet embarked on expanding higher education opportunities to provinces, culminating in the establishment of the "Mahidol University Kanchanaburi Establishment Project" in June of that year. A significant milestone occurred in April 1998 when His Majesty King Bhumibol Adulyadej granted royal permission for the laying of the campus's foundation stone by His Royal Highness Crown Prince Maha Vajiralongkorn.

Over the years, Mahidol University Kanchanaburi Campus underwent transformative changes, starting with the introduction of undergraduate programs under the College of Management in 2001, followed by the incorporation of programs under the Faculty of Science in 2002. Notable transitions included the campus's rebranding as "Mahidol University Kanchanaburi Campus" in 2009 and the renaming of the Bachelor of Business Administration Program in 2012. Continuing its trajectory of progress, the campus expanded its offerings with new programs such as the Bachelor of Engineering (Environmental Engineering and Disaster Management) and Bachelor of Accountancy in 2014. Moreover, it introduced a graduate program, Master of Science in Food Resources and Ecosystem Sustainability, in 2020.

Mahidol is developing two more provincial campuses: the 672-acre (2.72 km^{2}) Nakhon Sawan campus in Nakhon Sawan Province of northern Thailand, and the 169-acre (0.68 km^{2}) Amnat Charoen campus in Amnat Charoen Province in the northeast. Nakhon Sawan, with an administration building and lecture, laboratory and hospital buildings, offers undergraduate programs in Agricultural Science, Ecocultural Entrepreneurship, Nursing Science, and Public Health. The Amnat Charoen campus, completed in 2009, offers undergraduate programs in Agricultural Science, Innovation for Social and Environmental Management, and Public Health.

== See also ==
- List of universities and colleges in Thailand
