= Faculty of Medicine Ramathibodi Hospital, Mahidol University =

Medical school in Thailand

- คณะแพทยศาสตร์โรงพยาบาลรามาธิบดี มหาวิทยาลัยมหิดล
- Type: Public (non-profit)
- Established: 1964 (approved by cabinet); 1969 (opened)
- Parent institution: Mahidol University
- Dean: Clinical Prof. Artit Ungkanont, M.D.
- Administrative staff: 8,315 (2013): 753 academic 7,562 supporting
- Undergraduates: 2,248 (2019): 1,081 medical 113 comm. disorder 922 nursing 132 paramedic
- Location: Phaya Thai Campus Ramathibodi Hospital, 270 Rama VI Road, Thung Phayathai Subdistrict, Ratchathewi, Bangkok 10400 Bang Phli Campus Chakri Naruebodindra Medical Institute, 111 Suvarnabhumi Canal Road, Bang Pla Subdistrict, Bang Phli District, Samut Prakan Province 10540
- Colors: Emerald green
- Website: www.rama.mahidol.ac.th

The Faculty of Medicine Ramathibodi Hospital, Mahidol University (Thai: คณะแพทยศาสตร์โรงพยาบาลรามาธิบดี มหาวิทยาลัยมหิดล) has long been regarded as Thailand's most prestigious medical school.

== History ==
Following the Second National Economic and Social Development Plan (1964–1966), the Thai government aimed to increase the number of doctors and nurses in order to meet the needs of the country. In August 1964, the government cabinet approved the plan of setting up a new medical school which would be located around the Phaya Thai area, on the Thung Phaya Thai grounds owned by the Treasury Department and located opposite the Ministry of Industry. Furthermore, a new hospital called was also to be built on the site. On December 30, 1965, HM King Bhumibol Adulyadej graciously conferred upon the name of this new medical school “Ramathibodi” and laid the foundation stone for the faculty and hospital's buildings, as well as officially enrolling the first cohort of medical students at the Faculty of Science. Four years later, the King opened the new faculty and hospital on May 3, 1969, and patient admission started three days later. Apart from government funding, the faculty was also financially and academically supported by the Rockefeller Foundation of the United States. Faculty of Medicine Ramathibodi Hospital is one of two main medical schools within Mahidol University. The other older school is the Faculty of Medicine Siriraj Hospital, Mahidol University.

In 2010, the faculty started construction on a second campus: the Chakri Naruebodindra Medical Institute (CNMI) (Thai: สถาบันการแพทย์จักรีนฤบดินทร์), located in Bang Phli district, Samut Prakan province. It was aimed as a center for medical excellence in Asia to celebrate the 84th Anniversary of King Bhumibol Adulyadej's birthday, with CNMI being made the main campus for undergraduate medical education. The project approximately cost 6 billion Baht. The institute opened on 25 December 2017 and was attended by Princess Maha Chakri Sirindhorn. Medical education at the site was initiated in the 2021 academic year.

On 3 December 2023, the faculty opened "Ramathibodi Health Space", an outpatient clinic located in Paradise Park mall. This was part of the faculty's "decentralized medicine" concept, whereby patients could access tertiary care without having to travel to the main campus in central Bangkok.

== About ==
Ramathibodi Hospital is located on Rama VI Road, close to Chitralada Royal Villa. There are 5 main hospital buildings which serve at least 5,000 out-patient visits per day and has more than a total of 1,000 beds for tertiary inpatient medical care. It is served by Ramathibodi Hospital Railway Halt, operated by the State Railway of Thailand. There are dormitories and sports facilities for medical students located on-site.

== Departments ==
- Department of Anesthesiology
- Department of Clinical Epidemiology and Biostatistics
- Department of Communication Science and Disorders
- Department of Community Medicine
- Department of Diagnostic and Therapeutic Radiology
- Division of Emergency Medicine
- Department of Family Medicine
- Department of Internal Medicine
- Department of Obstetrics and Gynecology
- Department of Ophthalmology
- Department of Orthopedics
- Department of Otolaryngology
- Department of Pathology
- Department of Pediatrics
- Department of Psychiatry
- Department of Rehabilitation Medicine
- Department of Surgery
- School of Nursing
- Research Center
- Medical Education and Student Affairs
- Graduate Program In Nutrition Group

== Education ==
The faculty offers a range of courses including the following:

Undergraduate Programs	Graduate Programs			Other Training Programs
Undergraduate Programs	Residency and Fellowship Training	Master Programs	Doctorate Programs	Other Training Programs
Doctor of Medicine Bachelor of Science: Communication Disorders; Paramedical Science; Bachelor of Nursing Science	Anaesthesiology; Clinical Epidemiology and Biostatistics; Community Medicine; Diagnostic and Therapeutic Radiology; Emergency Medicine; Family Medicine; Internal Medicine; Obstetrics and Gynecology; Ophthalmology; Otolaryngology; Orthopedics; Pathology; Pediatrics; Psychiatry; Rehabilitation Medicine; Surgery	Master of Science: Communication Disorders; Data Science for Healthcare and Clinical Informatics (International Program); Medical Epidemiology (International Program); Medical Physics; Nutrition; Translational Medicine (International Program); Master of Nursing Science (International Program)	Doctor of Philosophy: Data Science for Healthcare and Clinical Informatics (International Program); Clinical Epidemiology (International Program); Nursing (International Program); Nutrition; Clinical Pathology; Translational Medicine (International Program)	Hospital Management (CEO); Health Service Chief Information Officer (CIO)

Apart from regular programs, the faculty also offers numerous resident specialty programs, sub-specialty programs, and fellowship programs.

=== Medicine ===
Ramathibodi develops the American style of study due to assistance from the Rockefeller Foundation during its founding period. The medical course aims to produce competent doctors with high professionalism, strong communication, teamwork, leadership and interpersonal skills. There is also an emphasis on research. High school students compete in an extremely competitive entrance examination and grueling interview process. Since 2017, the faculty was one of the first institutions in Thailand to use BMAT testing as part of student admissions for some entry quotas. The acceptance rate was 0.8% as of the 2017 academic year. For the 2018 academic year, a total of 180 undergraduate medical (RAMD) students were accepted into the course at the Faculty of Medicine Ramathibodi Hospital.

Medicine at the faculty is a six-year course. The first year consists of basic sciences, the second and third years consist of preclinical medical sciences, and the fourth to sixth years consist of clinical training. Until the 2019 academic year, the first year was taught at the Salaya Campus, the second and third years were taught at the Faculty of Science, Mahidol University at Phaya Thai Campus and clinical training was mainly based at Ramathibodi Hospital, with some ward rotations at CNMI and affiliated provincial hospitals. From the 2020 academic year, first year students remain at Salaya while medical students are mainly based at CNMI throughout second to sixth year with some ward rotations at Ramathibodi Hospital and affiliated provincial hospitals.

A joint-degree "MD-M.Eng" 7-year program was introduced since 2020, in cooperation with the Faculty of Engineering, Mahidol University, and students receive an additional Master of Engineering (Biomedical Engineering) at the end of the program. Another joint degree "MD-MM" 7-year program was introduced since 2021, in cooperation with the College of Management, Mahidol University, and students receive an additional Master of Management degree at the end of the program. Furthermore, some students may also be selected complete a PhD prior to entering clinical years; completion of the medical course dependent on the duration taken for their dissertation.

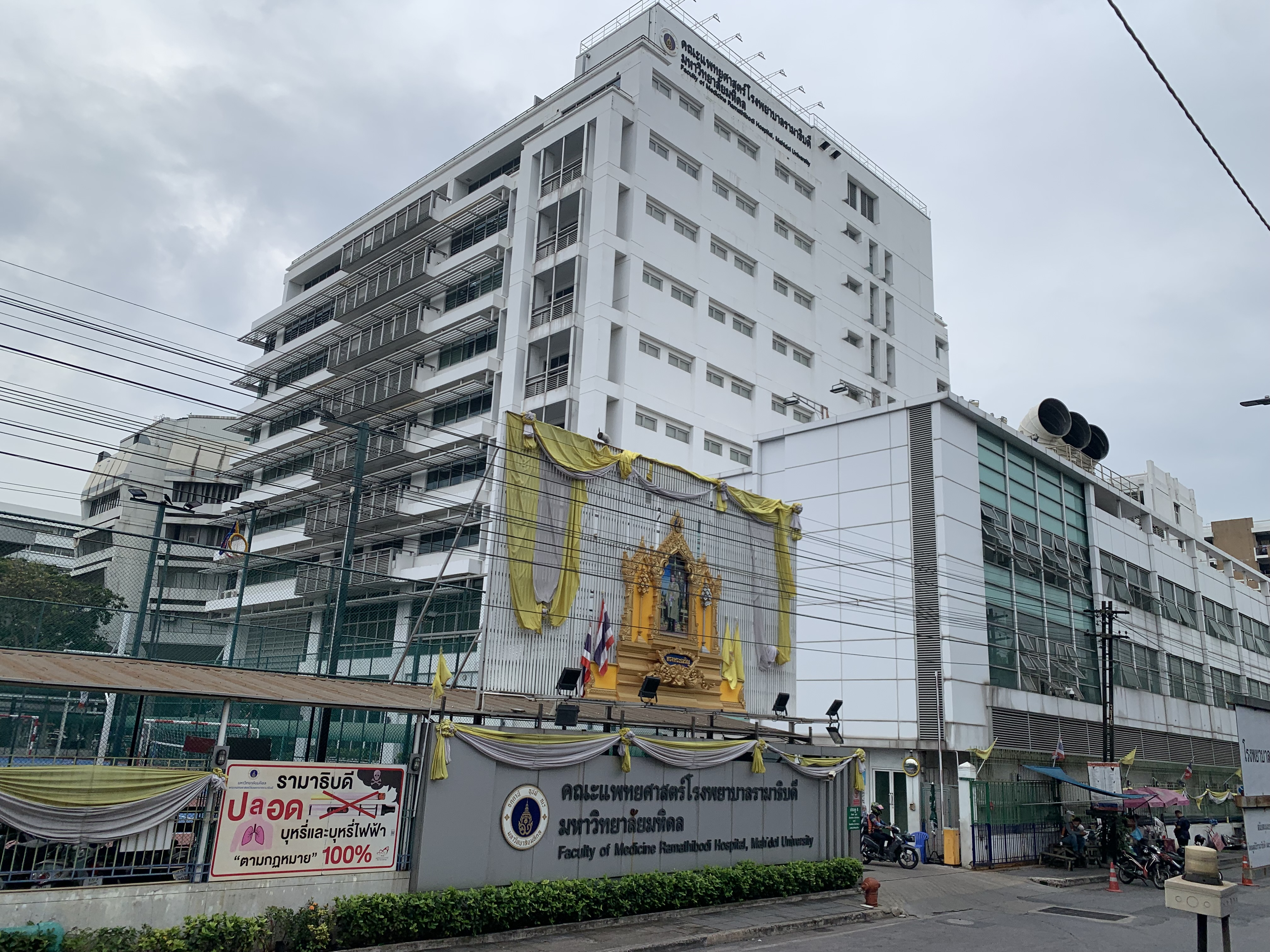
Rear Entrance and the School of Nursing Building

Since 2017, the Faculty of Medicine Ramathibodi Hospital has agreed with the HRH Princess Chulabhorn College of Medical Science for the medicine course (PCMD) to provide educational facilities for students for five cohorts. Around 30 PCMD students study together with RAMD students throughout the six-year medicine course.

== Main Teaching Hospitals ==
- Ramathibodi Hospital
- Chakri Naruebodindra Medical Institute

== Affiliated Teaching Hospitals ==
- Maharat Nakhon Ratchasima Hospital, Nakhon Ratchasima Province
- Buriram Hospital, Buriram Province
- Chao Phraya Yommarat Hospital, Suphan Buri Province
- Phra Nakhon Si Ayutthaya Hospital, Phra Nakhon Si Ayutthaya Province

== See also ==
- List of medical schools in Thailand
- Ramathibodi Hospital
- Chakri Naruebodindra Medical Institute
