= Stang Mongkolsuk =

Thai science educator

- สตางค์ มงคลสุข
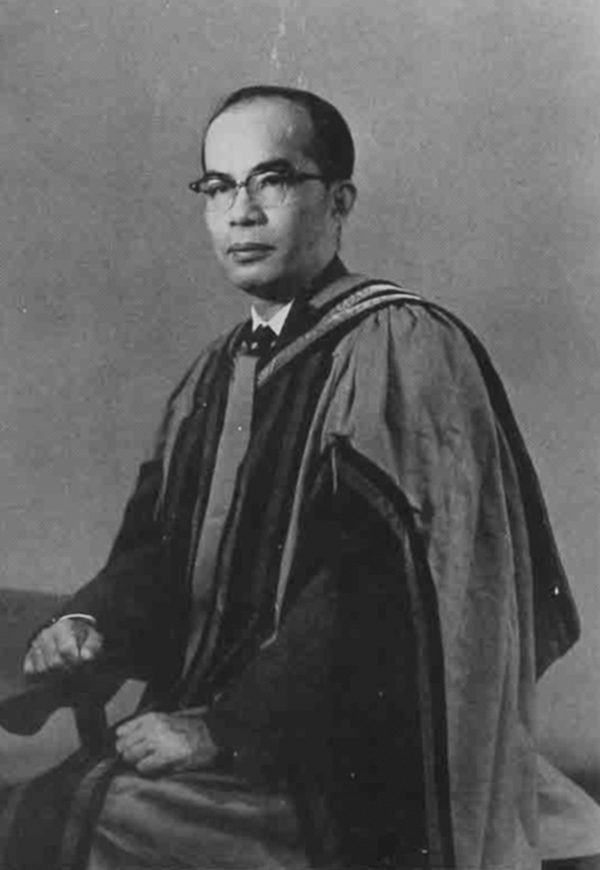
- Born: 15 July 1919; Tha Mai district, Kingdom of Siam
- Died: 6 July 1971 (aged 51); Thailand
- Occupation: Scientific educator
- Employer: University of Medical Sciences

Stang Mongkolsuk (Thai: สตางค์ มงคลสุข, RTGS: Satang Mongkhonsuk; 15 July 1919 – 6 July 1971) was a Thai science educator. He was a professor in chemistry at the University of Medical Sciences, now Mahidol University, where he founded the Faculty of Science and was its first dean. He was instrumental in the faculty's development in its early years, and later also helped establish science education at Chiang Mai, Khon Kaen and Prince of Songkla universities, at the last of which he also served as president.
