= College of Music, Mahidol University =

Music school in Thailand

- วิทยาลัยดุริยางคศิลป์ มหาวิทยาลัยมหิดล
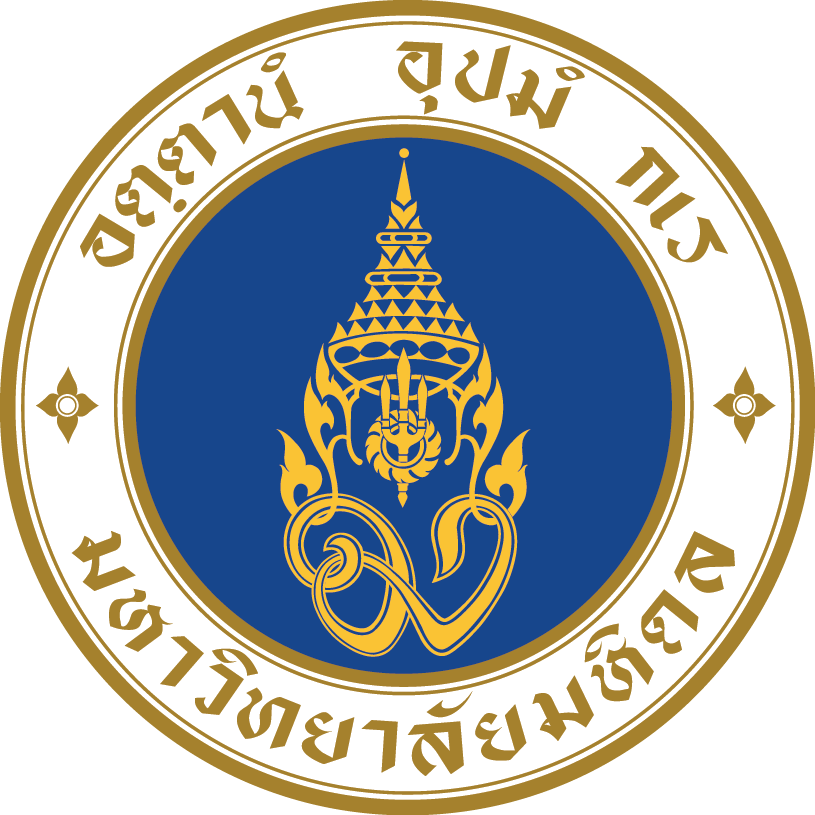
- Type: National
- Established: 21 September 1994
- Parent institution: Mahidol University
- Dean: Piyawat Louilarpprasert
- Students: 1252
- Location: 25/25 Phutthamonthon Sai 4 Road, Salaya Subdistrict, Phutthamonthon District, Nakhon Pathom Province 73170, Thailand (main campus)
- Campus: Rural
- Website: www.music.mahidol.ac.th

The College of Music, Mahidol University (Thai: วิทยาลัยดุริยางคศิลป์), is a music school in Phutthamonthon, Nakhon Pathom (in the western suburbs of Bangkok, Thailand). The College of Music is a faculty within Mahidol University. It was established in 1994 by Mahidol University under the leadership of Sugree Charoensook, the first music school in Thailand.

Today, there are more than 1,300 students enrolled in the precollege, undergraduate, and graduate levels of the College of Music (approximately 300 precollege, 750 undergraduates and 250 graduate students). Students come from throughout Thailand, and approximately 5% of students are from other countries, primarily Southeast Asia. Each year about 250 new students enroll, selected from more than 1,200 applicants. Over 8,000 students (ranging in age from 3 years to over 80 years of age) are enrolled in the College of Music's Music Campus for the General Public.

Since its founding in 1994, the Mahidol College of Music has quickly gained a reputation as Thailand's preeminent music school and the only comprehensive research institution for major areas of music study in Southeast Asia. The popularity of the College of Music in Thailand was spurred by the success of the Thai film Seasons Change.

== History ==
In 1987, former president of Mahidol University, Prof. Dr. Nat Pamornprawat, established a project called the Music Education Development Project and appointed Dr. Sugree Charoensook to lead it. The program was initially offered at the Institute of Languages and Cultures for Rural Development as an elective course for undergraduate students. In 1989, the Institute of Languages and Cultures for Rural Development launched the first music master's degree in Thailand, titled the Master of Arts in Music and Culture, with an emphasis in Music Education.

On September 21, 1994, the "College of Music Project" was accepted and acknowledged by Mahidol University. This date is known today as the founding date of the College of Music.

The Master of Arts degree program was first introduced in 1995. The bachelor's degree program was first offered in 1998. The high school preparatory Young Artists Music Program was created in 2002. In 2005, the college introduced the first Ph.D. music program in Thailand. In 2013, the college will introduce Master of Music and Doctor of Music degrees. The D.M. degree will be the first such program in Southeast Asia.

== List of deans ==
- 1994–2017: Dr. Sugree Charoensook
- 2017–2025: Dr. Narong Prangcharoen
- 2025–present: Dr. Piyawat Louilarpprasert

== Administration ==
Since the founding of the Mahidol College of Music in 1994, the school has been directed by one man: Sugree Charoensook has served as Dean since the college's opening.

== Campus and facilities ==
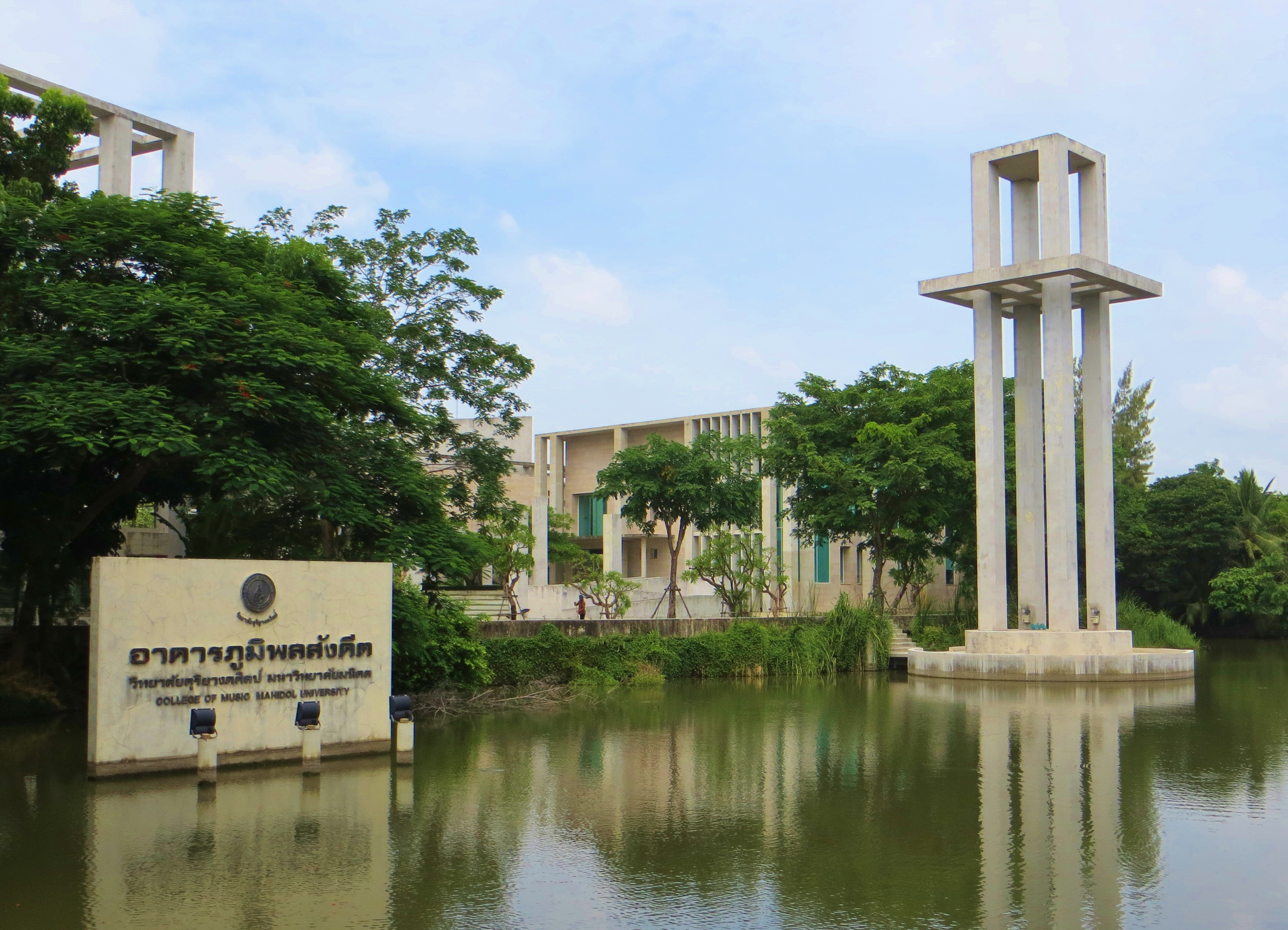
View of the College of Music from the walkway over the adjacent pond

The College of Music has four main buildings and fully equipped facilities for teaching, learning and working in all music areas. Specific facilities include a 353-seat music auditorium, 200-seat recital hall, two amphitheaters, eight ensemble rehearsal rooms, a cafe stage, 120 individual practice rooms, 80 individual teaching studios, 20 lecture rooms, three class piano rooms, audio visual rooms, MIDI lab, music business lab, three recording studios, music therapy lab, instrument repair and piano technical services lab, and the Jiew Bangsue Music Library.

Besides the facilities to support academics, the College of Music has a beautiful natural environment. The "Musica Arboretum" features over 1,500 trees that are used for making musical instruments throughout Southeast Asia. The Artist Residency and Music Business Center contain nine stores selling music scores, books, instruments, as well as residency housing for short-term guests. The college has its own restaurant which serves the university community, referred to as Music Square. The college operates the "Salaya Link", a shuttle bus service connecting Mahidol University Salaya Campus to Bang Wa station.

Prince Mahidol Hall, a 2,000-seat performing arts center that features orchestra, opera, musical theater, and other productions for the benefit of the Mahidol Community and the nation was finished in early 2014 and officially opened in April 2014.

The Southeast Asia Music Museum is an eight-floor building with over 19,000 square meters of space planned, including exhibit space, storage, lecture and seminar rooms, reception areas, and a performance venue. The museum will become the center for the study of Southeast Asian Music, with an expected opening in 2016.

The International Pre-College Building is an eight-story building built to house the college's Young Artist Music program. It will feature dormitory faculties, lecture rooms, rehearsal and performance spaces, individual practice rooms, and recreational facilities. The building will be completed in and opened in June 2016.

=== Jiew Bangsue Music Library ===
The Jiew Bangsue Music Library at the College of Music was founded in 1998. The library has two levels and includes book stacks, music listening labs, computer center, group study rooms, and a presentation room. With its completion, the Music Library at the College of Music became the first dedicated music library in Thailand. The library features over 300,000 virtual and physical volumes to support music scholarly study.

The Music Library's mission is to support and strengthen music performance, teaching, learning, and research, by providing the collections, services, and environments that lead to intellectual discovery and cultural growth. In 2010, the Music Library was renamed the "Jiew Bangsue Music Library" to honor the work of Thailand's first celebrated music writer: Dr. Chotsri Tharap. Dr. Chotsri wrote for decades under the penname "Jiew Bangsue," and her entire music collection of recordings, scores and books were donated to the library to help support the theme of music education in Thailand.

== Degrees offered ==
- Pre-College Diploma (Western Classical Music, Thai Classical Music, Jazz Studies)
- Bachelor of Music (B.M.) degree (Western Music Performance, Music Business, Jazz Studies, Music Technology, Popular Music, Composition, Thai and Eastern Music, Music Theater, Music Education and Pedagogy)
- Master of Arts (M.A.) degree (Music Business, Musicology, Music Education, Music Therapy)
- Master of Music (M.M.) degree (Performance and Pedagogy, Composition and Theory, Conducting, Jazz Studies, Collaborative Piano)
- Doctor of Philosophy (Ph.D.) degree (Musicology and Music Education)
- Doctor of Music (D.M.) degree (Performance and Pedagogy, Composition and Theory, Conducting)

== Music Campus for the General Public ==
The College of Music, Mahidol University was the first institution in Thailand to establish "shopping mall music schools" when it opened the Music Campus for the General Public at the Seri Center in 1998. Currently the college operates two such campuses at the Seacon Square Srinakarin and Siam Paragon shopping malls. The campus' aim is to enhance the general public's musical potential to its utmost level and to prepare prospective students for entrance into university music programs. A third campus will open at Seacon Square Bangkae in late 2012.

== Special events and activities ==
The college hosts many international activities each year on its campus. Recent events have included Southeast Asian Youth Orchestra and Wind Ensemble (SAYOWE), World Saxophone Congress, Thailand International Wind Ensemble Competition, Thailand International Piano Competition, Jean-Marie Londeix Saxophone Competition, Asian Double Reed Conference, Thailand Brass and Percussion Conference, Thailand International Composition Festival, and the Thailand International Jazz Conference.

In addition, the College of Music, Mahidol University hosts over 1,000 performances a year on its campus, including faculty and student recitals, ensemble concerts, workshops and master classes, and other special events.

== Placement test ==
T.I.M.E stands for "Thailand International Music Examination". It is the College of Music's placement test for musicians of every level. Levels extend from Grades 1 to 12 and professional diplomas in Performance and Pedagogy. This project will be used with every music subject and for every kind of Thai and Western instrument.

== Awards and honors ==
2009–2010, Rhinegold Publishing "World Conservatories and International Guide to Music Study". The College of Music was one of only two schools from Southeast Asia listed.

In 2010, Thailand's National Identity Committee chose the College of Music, Mahidol University as "Thailand's Outstanding Institution".

The college hosted the first two major international music conferences in Thailand — the 2005 International Trumpet Guild Conference and the 2009 World Saxophone Congress.

== Thailand Philharmonic Orchestra ==
The College of Music, Mahidol University is one of a few music schools that hosts its own professional orchestra — The Thailand Philharmonic Orchestra. The TPO was founded in 2005 and is currently performing its eleventh full season.
