= Jarupan Kuldiloke =

Thai politician and activist (born 1973)

Jarupan Kuldiloke (born 9 August 1973) is a Thai politician and political activist. She is daughter of Chut Kuldiloke.

== Education ==
Jarupan Kuldiloke graduated Bachelor's degree at Mahidol University and master's degree at University of Birmingham and Doctor of Philosophy at Humboldt University of Berlin.

== Work ==
Jarupan Kuldiloke was professor at Mahidol University since 2003 to 2009. She resigned in 2008 and She is Member of parliament of Pheu Thai Party.

== Award ==
- 1998 - 2000 Doctoral Fellowship, EU-Commission on Food Technology Project, Technische Universität Berlin
- 1994 - 1995 Research Fellowship, The University of Birmingham, UK

== Insignia ==
- 2013 - Order of the White Elephant
- 2012 - Order of the Crown of Thailand
- 2011 - Order of the White Elephant
