= Damnoen Saduak Hospital =

Damnoen Saduak Hospital โรงพยาบาลดำเนินสะดวก
- The Ministry of Public Health Health District 5

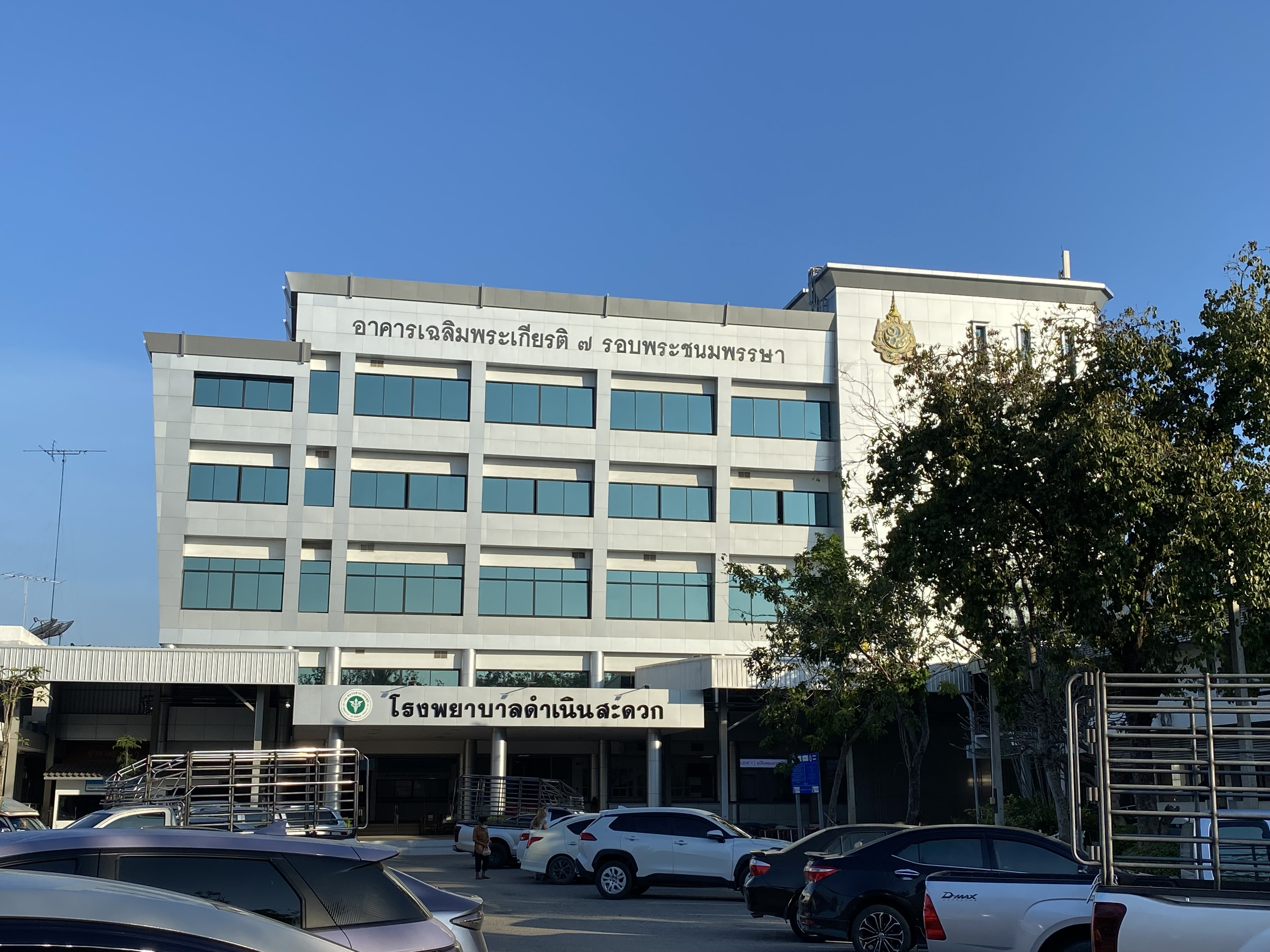

Geography
- Location: 146 Tha Nat Subdistrict, Damnoen Saduak district, Ratchaburi 70130, Thailand
- Coordinates: 13.5365157°N 99.965853°E

Organisation
- Type: General
- Affiliated university: Faculty of Medicine Siriraj Hospital, Mahidol University

Services
- Beds: 272

History
- Founded: 1964

Links
- Website: dnhospital.go.th
- Lists: Hospitals in Thailand

Damnoen Saduak Hospital (Thai: โรงพยาบาลดำเนินสะดวก), is a hospital located in Damnoen Saduak district, Ratchaburi province, Thailand. It is classified under the Ministry of Public Health as a general hospital and is one of three general hospitals in the province. It is an affiliated teaching hospital of the Faculty of Medicine Siriraj Hospital, Mahidol University. The hospital is located nearby Damnoen Saduak Floating Market.

== History ==
Construction of Damnoen Saduak Hospital started in 1959 due to a cholera outbreak in 1957 and the difficulty of traveling to Ratchaburi Hospital, the main hospital of the province which could only be done by canal boats. It was funded by the Ministry of Public Health and opened by Phra Bamrasnaradura in 1964 with a capacity of 50 beds. The hospital underwent significant renovation and construction, reaching a capacity of 272 beds in 2022.

On 4 February 2023, a fire broke out in the emergency department. There were no casualties, with a financial damage valued at 10 million baht. As of March 2024, it has a capacity of 272 beds.

== See also ==
- Healthcare in Thailand
- Hospitals in Thailand
- List of hospitals in Thailand
