= Golden Jubilee Medical Center =

Golden Jubilee Medical Center ศูนย์การแพทย์กาญจนาภิเษก
- Faculty of Medicine Siriraj Hospital

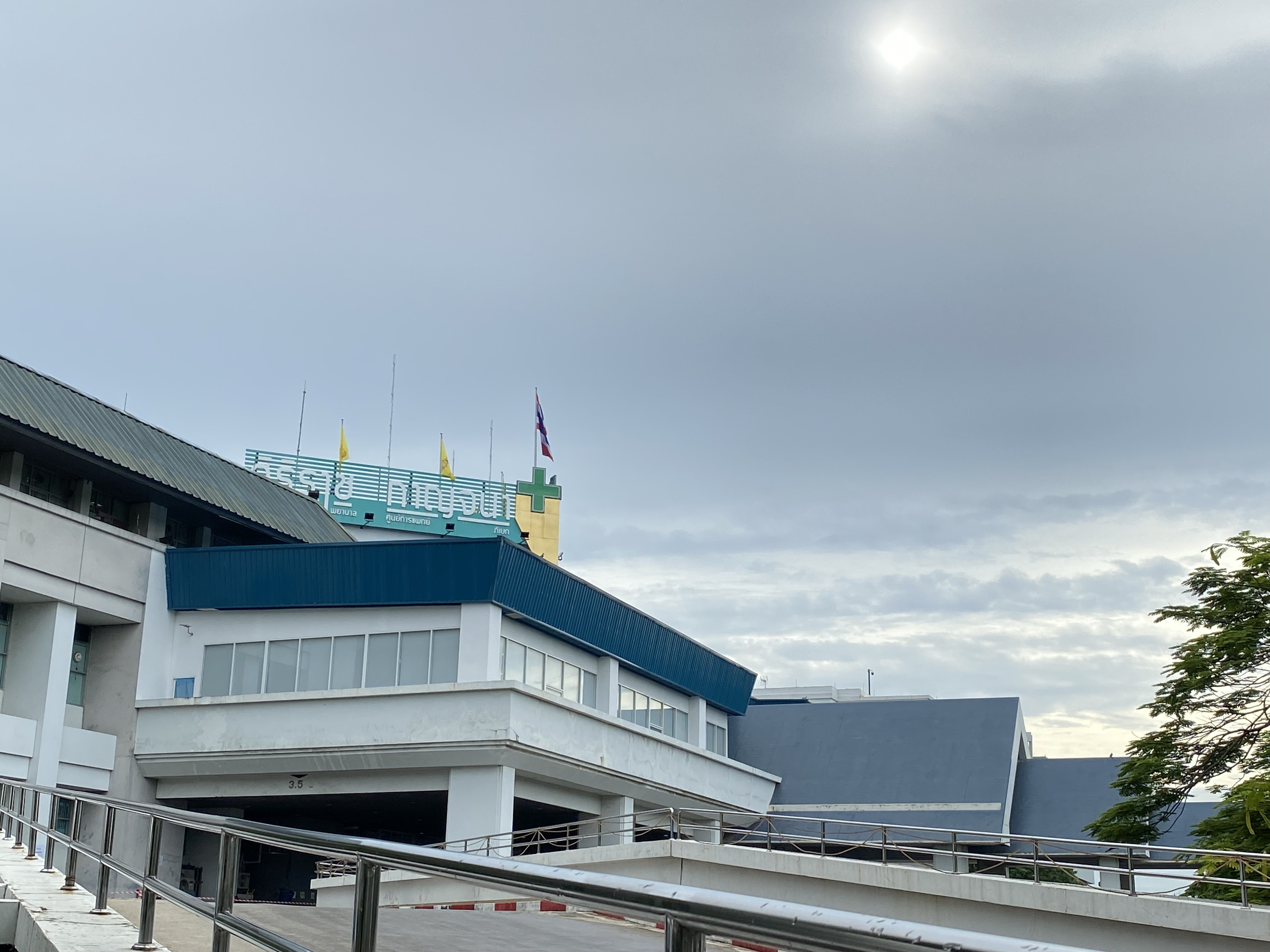

Geography
- Location: 999 Boromarajajonani Road, Salaya Subdistrict, Phutthamonthon District, Nakhon Pathom Province, 73170, Thailand
- Coordinates: 13.787049°N 100.321501°E

Organisation
- Type: General
- Affiliated university: Faculty of Medicine Siriraj Hospital, Mahidol University

Services
- Emergency department: Yes
- Beds: 60

History
- Opened: 1991

Links
- Website: www.gj.mahidol.ac.th
- Lists: Hospitals in Thailand

The Golden Jubilee Medical Center (Thai: ศูนย์การแพทย์กาญจนาภิเษก) is a hospital operated by the Faculty of Medicine Siriraj Hospital of Mahidol University. It is located near the Mahidol University Salaya Campus in Phutthamonthon District, Nakhon Pathom Province.

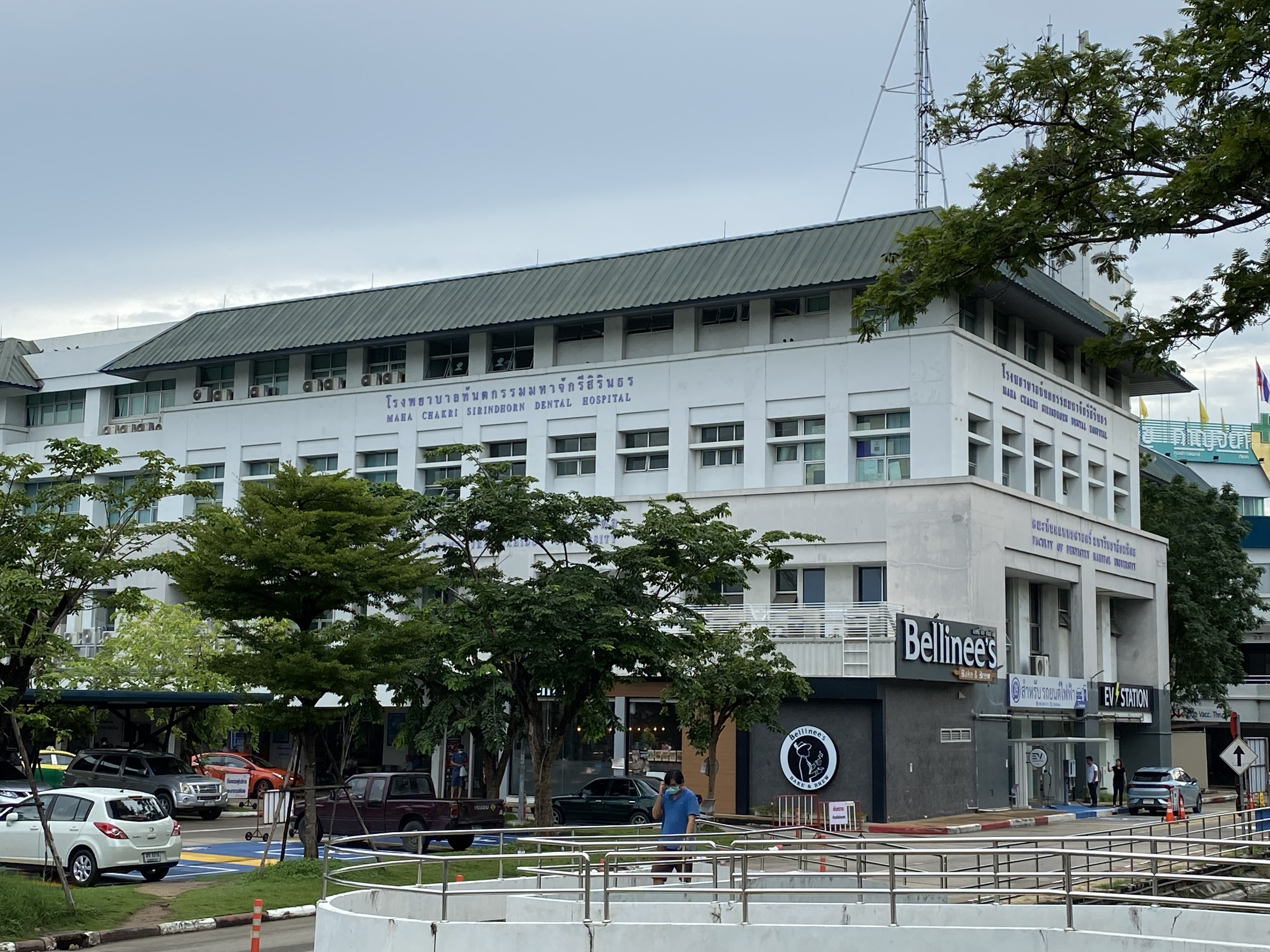
Dental Hospital, Golden Jubilee Medical Center

== History ==
The hospital was operated by the Office of the President, Mahidol University until 1 October 2017, when operations were transferred to the Faculty of Medicine Siriraj Hospital. The number of beds is planned to increase from 60 to 200 beds.

== See also ==
- Hospitals in Thailand
