= Thesaban =

Local government type in Thailand

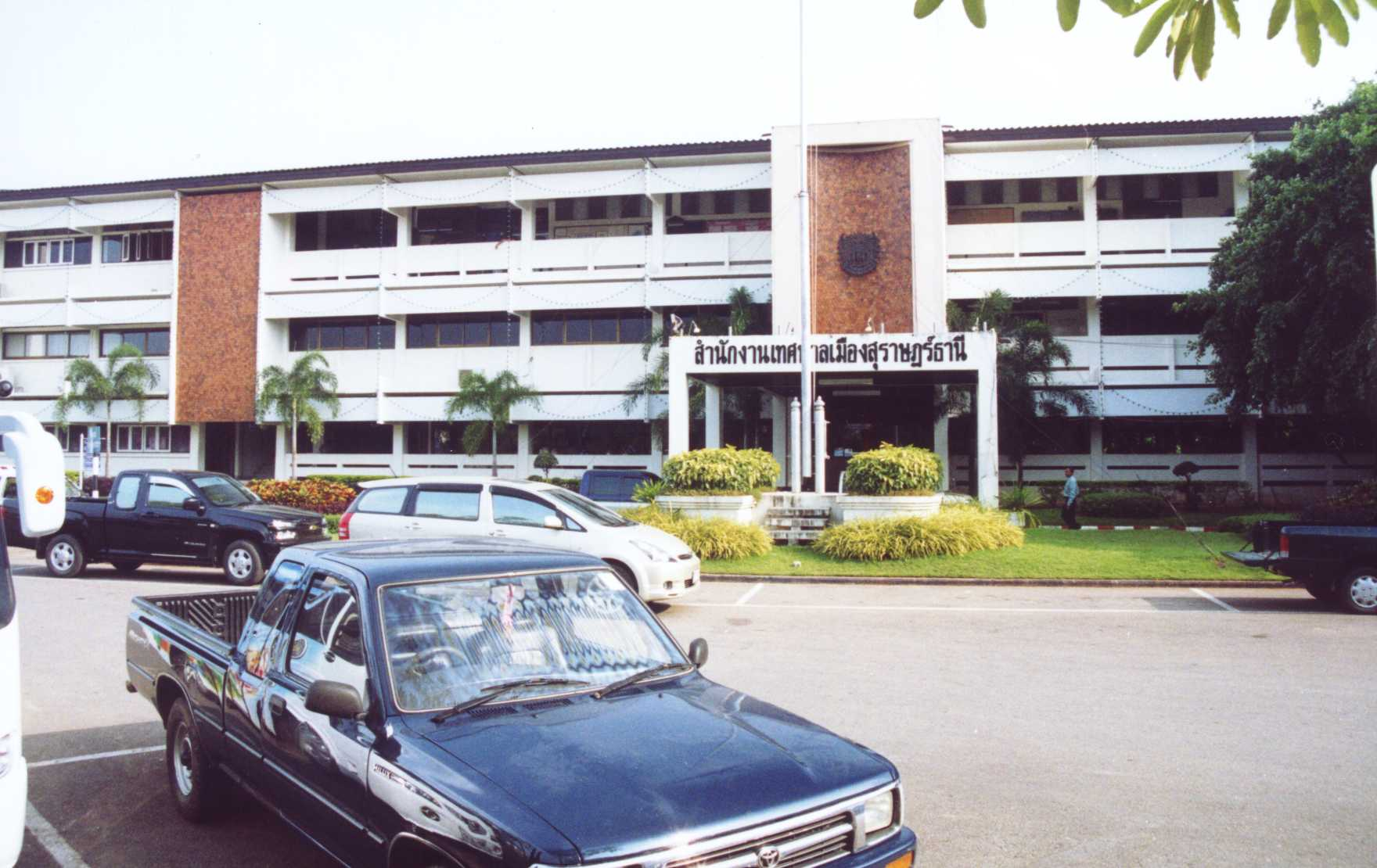
Thesaban administration building, Surat Thani city

Thesaban (Thai: เทศบาล, RTGS: thetsaban, pronounced [tʰêːt.sà.bāːn], Pali: desapāla, lit. 'protector of region') are the municipalities of Thailand. There are three levels of municipalities: city, town, and sub-district. Bangkok and Pattaya are special municipal entities not included in the thesaban system.

The municipalities assume some of the responsibilities which are assigned to the districts (amphoe) or subdistricts (tambon) for non-municipal (rural) areas. Historically, this devolution of central government powers grew out of the Sukhaphiban (สุขาภิบาล) sanitary districts first created in Bangkok by a royal decree of King Chulalongkorn in 1897.

The thesaban system was established in the Thesaban Organization Act of 1934 (Thai: พระราชบัญญัติจัดระเบียบเทศบาล พุทธศักราช ๒๔๗๖), and has been updated several times since, starting with the Thesaban Act of 1939 (Thai: พระราชบัญญัติเทศบาล พุทธศักราช ๒๔๘๑), which was replaced by the Thesaban Act of 1953. The 1953 act was most recently amended by the Thesaban Act (No. 12) of 2003.

== City municipality ==
Thesaban nakhon (Thai: เทศบาลนคร, RTGS: thetsaban nakhon, pronounced [tʰêːt.sà.bāːn ná(ʔ).kʰɔ̄ːn]) is translated as "city municipality". To qualify for city status a municipality needs to have a population of at least 50,000 and sufficient income to carry out the tasks of a city.

When first organized in 1934, the minimum qualifications for city status were a population of 30,000 with a density of 1,000 per km^{2}. In 1939 the required population density was increased to 2,000 per km^{2}, along with the addition of a financial requirement. In 1953 the population density requirement was again raised, to 3,000 per km^{2}, before being removed entirely in 2000.

For 22 years, from 1972 to 1994, as well as between March and November 1936, there was only one city municipality in Thailand, which was Chiang Mai, as in 1972 Bangkok had been changed from city municipality, to special governed district. Until 1972 there were three city municipalities: Chiang Mai, Phra Nakhon (now Bangkok), and Thonburi (now part of Bangkok). In 1994, Nakhon Si Thammarat town municipality became the second city municipality of Thailand, and the first in the south.

== Town municipality ==
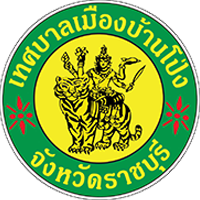
Banpong Municipality Logo

Thesaban mueang (Thai: เทศบาลเมือง, RTGS: thetsaban mueang, pronounced [tʰêːt.sà.bāːn mɯ̄a̯ŋ]) is translated as "town municipality". For a municipality to qualify as a town, it either needs to be a provincial capital, or have a population of at least 10,000 and sufficient income to cover the tasks of a town.

When first organized in 1934, the minimum qualification for town status was a population of 3,000 with a density of 1,000 per km^{2}. In 1939 requirements were increased to a population of 5,000 with a density of 2,000 per km^{2}, plus a financial criterion. In 1953, the minimum population requirements were raised to the present value; the population density was also raised, to 3,000 per km^{2}, before being removed entirely in 2000.

== Subdistrict municipality ==
Thesaban tambon (Thai: เทศบาลตำบล, RTGS: thetsaban tambon, pronounced [tʰêːt.sā.bāːn tām.bōn]), the lowest level municipal unit, is usually translated as "sub-district municipality". Despite the name, it may not necessarily cover the same area as a sub-district (tambon); i.e., it may not cover a tambon completely, or conversely, it may extend over parts of more than one tambon.

For an area to qualify as a thesaban tambon, it must have a gross income of at least 5 million baht and a population of at least 5,000 with a minimum density of 1,500 per km^{2}, plus the approval of the population within that area.

Many of today's thesaban municipalities were originally sukhaphiban tambon, sanitation districts, the number of which had grown to 35 in 1935, when these were converted into municipalities. New sanitary districts were again established starting in 1952. With the Act to Upgrade Sanitary Districts to Thesaban of May 1999 all were converted that month, though many of them did not actually meet the criteria above.

== See also ==
- Mueang, Thailand section
- List of municipalities in Thailand
- Subdivisions of Thailand
