= Prince Mahidol Hall =

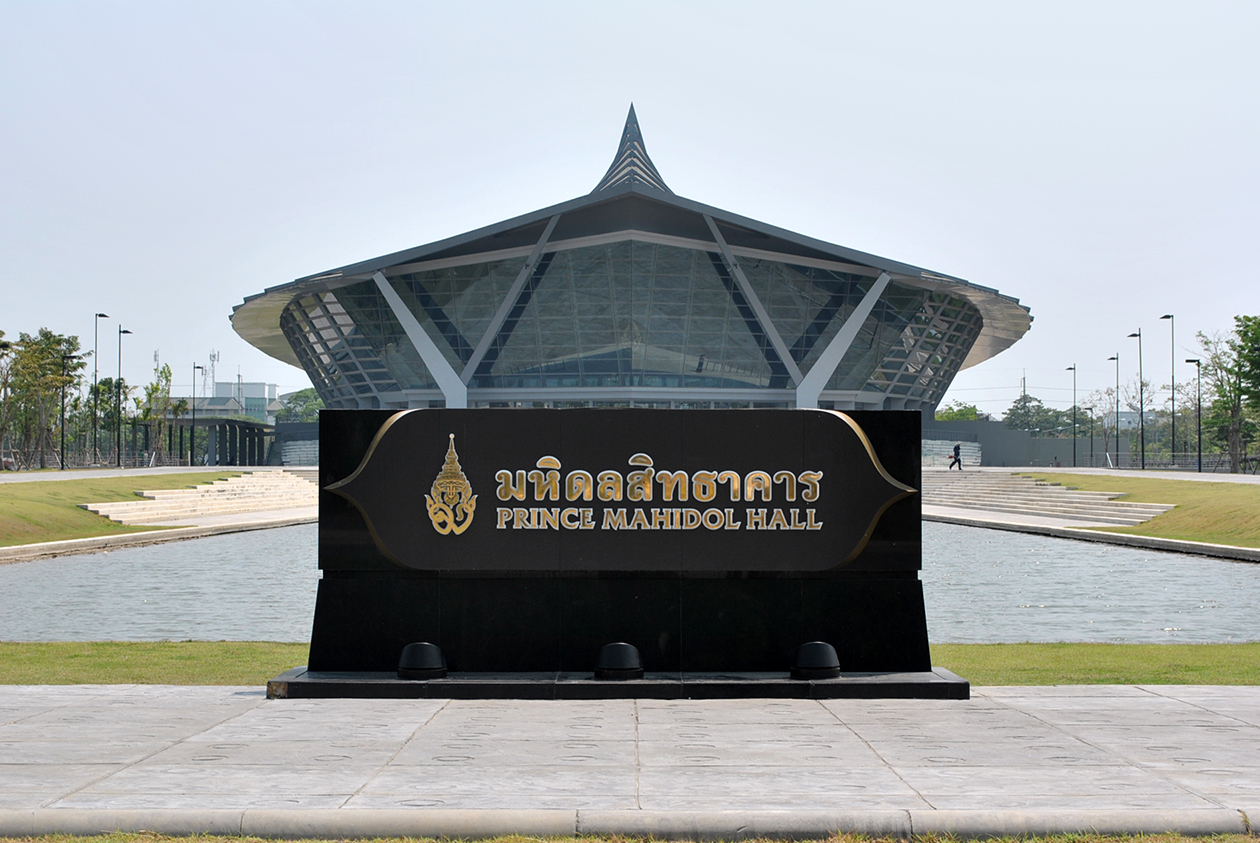
- Prince Mahidol Hall Building
- Interactive map of the Prince Mahidol Hall area

General information
- Location: Phutthamonthon, Nakhon Pathom, Thailand
- Coordinates: 13°47′22.4″N 100°19′16.2″E
- Opened: April 2014
- Owner: Mahidol University

Design and construction
- Architect: Architect 49 Limited

Other information
- Seating capacity: 2,006

Website
- princemahidolhall

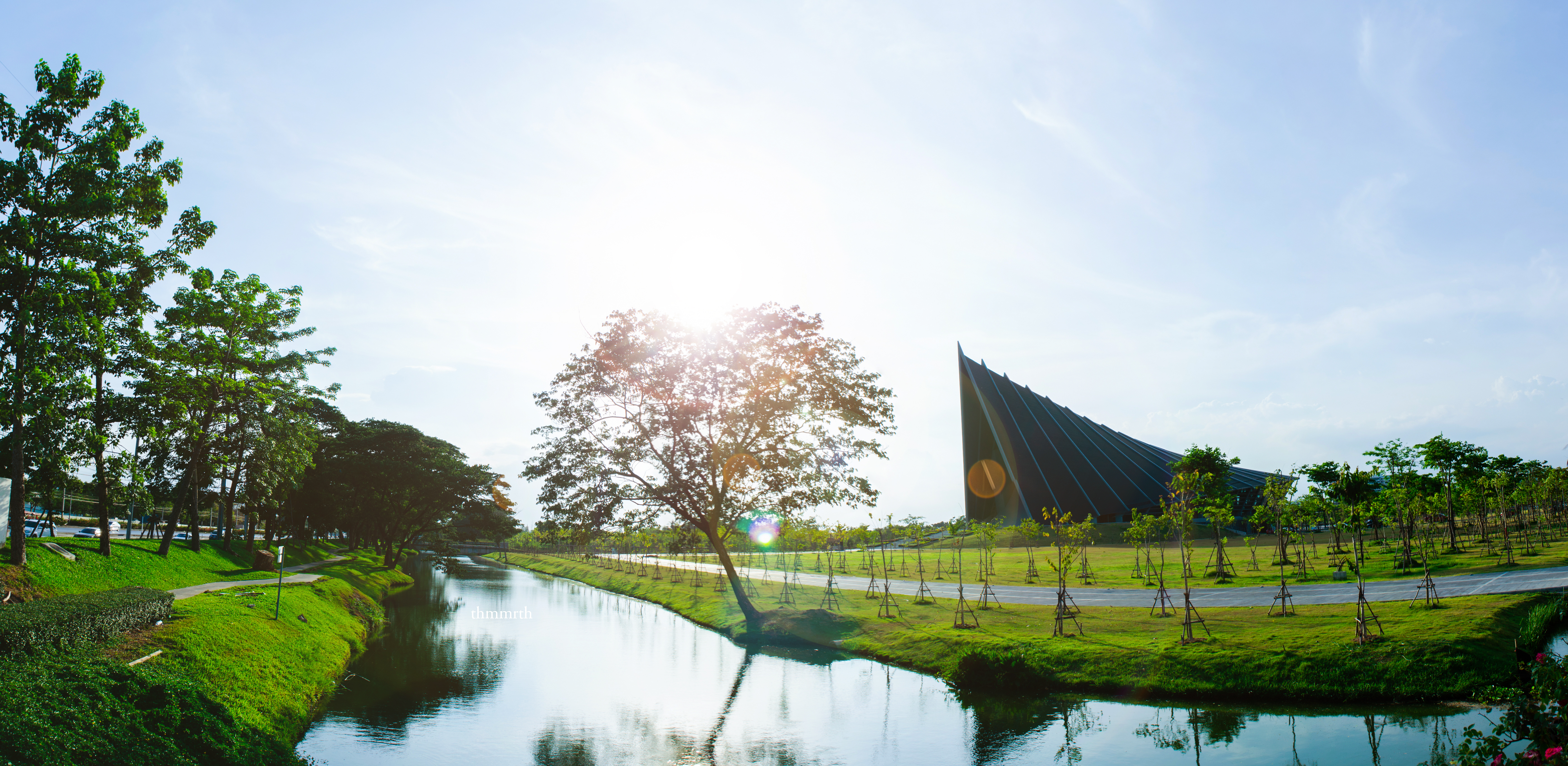
A wide angle shot of Prince Mahidol Hall, from the Borommaratchachonnani gate

Prince Mahidol Hall (Thai: มหิดลสิทธาคาร Mahidol Sittha-kharn) is a concert hall of Mahidol University and the largest concert hall of Thailand, located in Phutthamonthon District, Nakhon Pathom. The hall was named after Prince Mahidol Adulyadej.

The hall was inaugurated on 14 April 2014 by Princess Maha Chakri Sirindhorn and a performance by the Thailand Philharmonic Orchestra. The hall was also chosen by Tokyo Philharmonic Orchestra on its 100th Anniversary World Tour 2014 list. The architecture concept based on physical structure of human and plant. The roof has two layers in order to cut off a noise from outside, the inner layer covered with a distinctive material, the outer layer covered with copper.
