= Maharat Nakhon Ratchasima Hospital =

Maharat Nakhon Ratchasima Hospital โรงพยาบาลมหาราชนครราชสีมา
- The Ministry of Public Health Health District 9

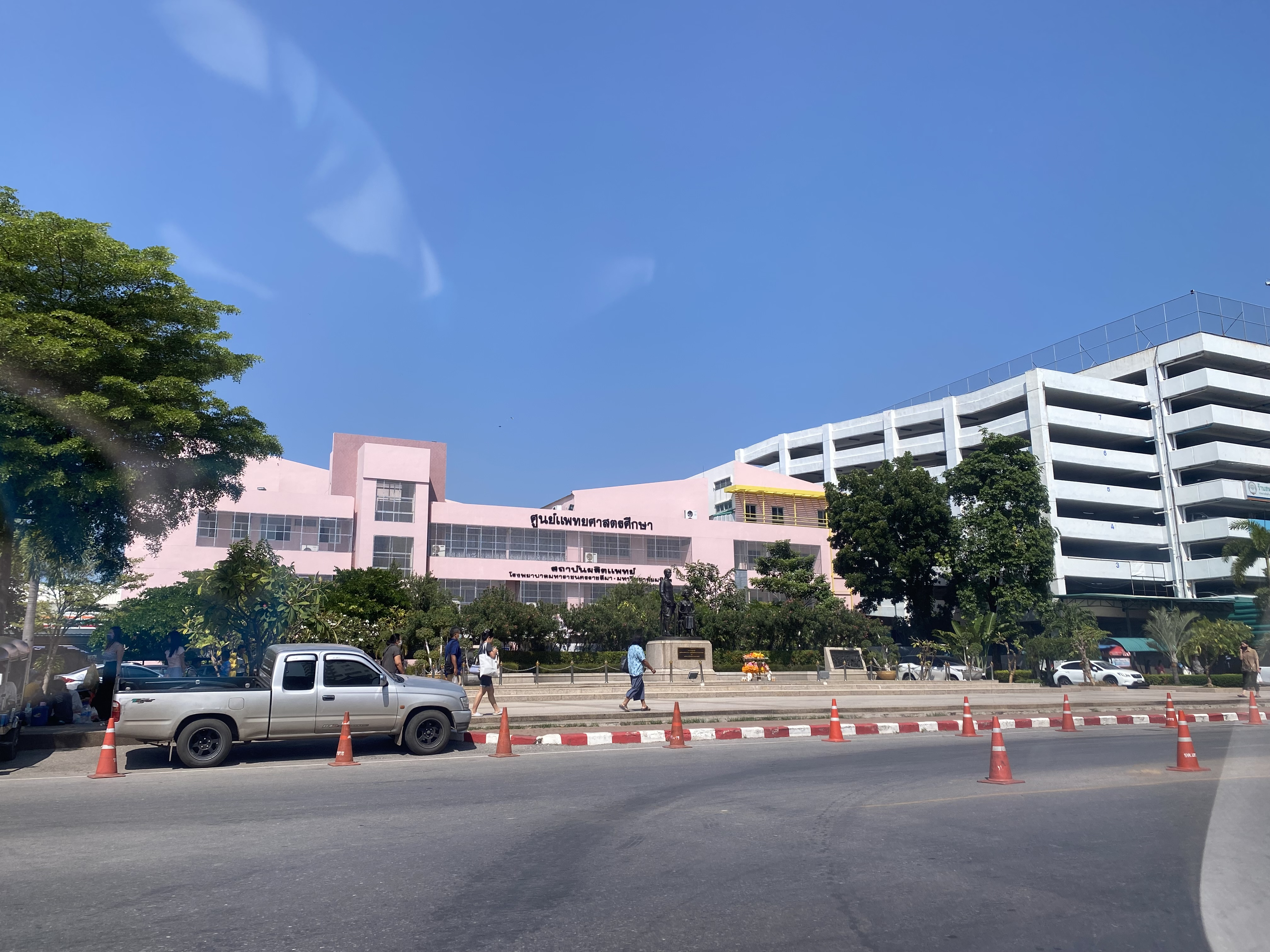
- Medical education center building

Geography
- Location: 49 Chang Phueak Road, Nai Mueang Subdistrict, Mueang Nakhon Ratchasima District, Nakhon Ratchasima 30000, Thailand
- Coordinates: 14.984744°N 102.103537°E

Organisation
- Type: Regional
- Affiliated university: MOPH-Mahidol CPIRD Program Faculty of Medicine Ramathibodi Hospital, Mahidol University Phramongkutklao College of Medicine

Services
- Beds: 1478

History
- Former names: Sukhaphiban 2 Hospital Suan Mon Hospital Nakhon Ratchasima City Municipality Hospital Nakhon Ratchasima City Hospital
- Opened: 28 September 1909

Links
- Website: www.mnrh.go.th/th/
- Lists: Hospitals in Thailand

Maharat Nakhon Ratchasima Hospital (Thai: โรงพยาบาลมหาราชนครราชสีมา) is the main hospital of Nakhon Ratchasima Province, Thailand and is classified under the Ministry of Public Health as a regional hospital. It is the largest regional hospital in Thailand under the responsibility of the ministry and has 1,478 beds. It has a CPIRD Medical Education Center which mainly trains medical students in the MOPH-Mahidol CPIRD Program of Mahidol University, as well as being an affiliated hospital to the Faculty of Medicine Ramathibodi Hospital, Mahidol University and Phramongkutklao College of Medicine.

== History ==
Following the setup of sukhaphiban in Nakhon Ratchasima Province under the reign of King Chulalongkorn, two hospitals were built in the local area:

- Sukhaphiban 1 Hospital treating general patients at Pho Klang Subdistrict
- Sukhaphiban 2 Hospital treating patients with infectious diseases at Suan Mon Subdistrict

Sukhaphiban 1 Hospital was then merged into Sukhaphiban 2 Hospital and renamed 'Suan Mon Hospital'.

On 1 February 1935, Suan Mon Hospital was transferred from the responsibility of Sukhaphiban Hospitals Organisation to Nakhon Ratchasima City Municipality and the hospital was renamed 'Nakhon Ratchasima City Municipality Hospital'. On 1 September 1954, operations were transferred to the Ministry of Public Health and renamed 'Nakhon Ratchasima City Hospital', and was categorised as a provincial hospital. In 1974, the hospital was re-categorised as a regional hospital. On 5 September 1981, the hospital was renamed by the Ministry of Public Health as 'Maharat Nakhon Ratchasima Hospital' in honour of King Bhumibol Adulyadej.

== See also ==
- Healthcare in Thailand
- Hospitals in Thailand
- List of hospitals in Thailand
