= Faculty of Medicine Siriraj Hospital, Mahidol University =

Medical school in Thailand

Coordinates: 13°45′24″N 100°29′11″E

- คณะแพทยศาสตร์ศิริราชพยาบาล มหาวิทยาลัยมหิดล
- Former names: Bhatayakorn School; Rajapaethayalai; Faculty of Medicine of Chulalongkorn University; Faculty of Medicine and Siriraj Hospital
- Type: Public
- Established: 1889
- Parent institution: Mahidol University
- Dean: Prof. Apichart Asavamongkolkul, M.D.
- Administrative staff: 9,315
- Students: 1,662
- Location: Bangkok, Thailand
- Campus: Urban
- Colors: Green
- Website: Faculty of Medicine Siriraj Hospital, Mahidol University

Faculty of Medicine Siriraj Hospital, Mahidol University (Thai: คณะแพทยศาสตร์ศิริราชพยาบาล) is the oldest and largest medical school and the oldest of any kind of university faculty in Thailand. The faculty is now part of Mahidol University. Founded in 1889, the faculty was run in co-operation with Siriraj Hospital, the first public hospital in Thailand, which provides students with clinical experience. The faculty's campus and hospital is in the Bangkok Noi District, Bangkok, on the former Rear Palace. The medical school accepts about 250 students for undergraduate education and more than 100 to postgraduate studies each year.

== History ==
Siriraj Hospital, the first public hospital in Siam, was founded in 1888 under commissions and subsidy of King Chulalongkorn, named after the deceased Prince Siriraj Kakudhabhand. However, the modern medical practitioners were still lacking as they refused to come under government's employments. The medical school was established in May 1889 known as Bhatayakorn School (Thai: โรงเรียนแพทยากร i.e. School of Medical Practitioners). Any students who finished their Mattayom education were admitted for free for a three-year course. The school was originally taught solely by George B. McFarland. On May 1, 1893, King Chulalongkorn changed the name of the school to Rajapaethayalai (Thai: ราชแพทยาลัย i.e. Royal Medical College) with McFarland as the first director of the school. The school facilities and the dormitories were constructed.

In 1903, the course was expanded to four years. In 1913, Prince of Chainat, the Deputy Minister of Ministry of Education, added the natural sciences into the curriculum in addition to the medical sciences and the course was expanded to five years. The Traditional Thai Medicine major was abolished in 1915 and instead the Pharmacy major was established. On April 6, 1917, the Rajapaethayalai was annexed to newly founded Chulalongkorn University (founded by Vajiravudh's earlier decree in 1917). The medical school became the Faculty of Medicine of Chulalongkorn University (Thai: คณะแพทยศาสตร์แห่งจุฬาลงกรณ์มหาวิทยาลัย) and was later renamed to Faculty of Medicine and Siriraj Hospital (Thai: คณะแพทยศาสตร์และศิริราชพยาบาล). At Chulalongkorn University, in 1918, the medical course was expanded to six years - with first four pre-clinical years at the Faculty of Arts and Sciences of Chulalongkorn University and later two clinical years at the Siriraj Faculty.

In 1921, Siam, with Prince Mahidol the Krom Khun Songkla as the agent, negotiated with the Rockefeller Foundation to send aids for Siamese medical system and education. Men from Rockefeller reformed the medical education including Prof. A.G.Ellis who introduced pathology. In 1928, the medical certificate were granted to the students for the first time during their graduation. And in 1932, the first postgraduate medical students and first female medical students finished their educations.

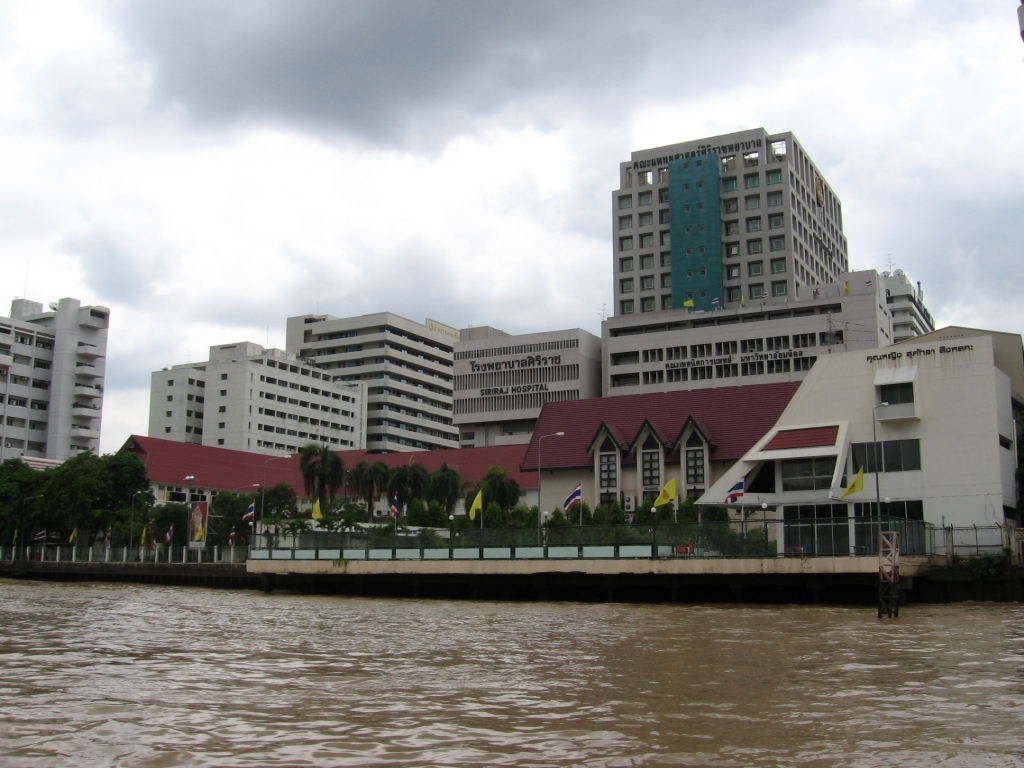
Siriraj Hospital

As a part of educational reforms under the government led by General Phibun, the Siriraj Faculty of Medicine, along with departments of Dentistry, Pharmacy, and Veterinary Science, were carved out from Chulalongkorn University and were re-organized into the University of Medical Sciences (Thai: มหาวิทยาลัยแพทยศาสตร์) on February 7, 1943. In 1958, the Medical Science Preparatory School (now Faculty of Science, Mahidol University) was established and the first-year students had then received preliminary education from that Preparatory School at Phaya Thai. The Siriraj Faculty became one of the several medical schools within the University of Medical Sciences.

On February 21, 1969, an announcement under the name of King Bhumibol Adulyadej declared the name of the medical university to be changed to Mahidol University. The school name was changed to Faculty of Medicine Siriraj Hospital (Thai: คณะแพทยศาสตร์ศิริราชพยาบาล; deleting the "and"). In 1983, the Salaya campus was completed and the Faculty of Science was partially moved to Salaya campus, so as the education of Siriraj's first-year students.

Under the patronage of Prince Mahidol Adulyadej and support from the Rockefeller Foundation, Siriraj became one of the most advanced medical services and research centers in Thailand and Southeast Asia.

The Faculty of Medicine Siriraj Hospital is one of the two medical schools within Mahidol University. The younger sister is the Faculty of Medicine Ramathibodi Hospital, Mahidol University.

== Departments ==
- Department of Anatomy
- Department of Anesthesiology
- Department of Biochemistry
- Department of Clinical Pathology
- Department of Dermatology
- Department of Forensic Medicine
- Department of Immunology
- Department of Medicine
- Department of Microbiology
- Department of Obstetrics and Gynaecology
- Department of Ophthalmology
- Department of Orthopaedic Surgery
- Department of Otolaryngology
- Department of Parasitology
- Department of Pathology
- Department of Pediatrics
- Department of Pharmacology
- Department of Physiology
- Department of Preventive and Social Medicine
- Department of Psychiatrics
- Department of Radiology
- Department of Rehabilitstion Medicine
- Department of Surgery
- Department of Transfusion Medicine
- Center of Applied Thai Traditional Medicine
- Medical Education Technology Center
- Siriraj Cancer Center
- Office for Research and Development
- Her Majesty Cardiac Center
- Sirindhorn School of Prosthetics and Orthotics (SSPO)

== Programs ==
The faculty now offers five undergraduate programs, ten postgraduate programs, and five doctorate programs.

Undergraduate Programs	Postgraduate Programs	Doctorate Programs
Medicine; Medical Education Technology; Prosthetics and Orthotics; Applied Traditional Thai Medicine	Anatomy; Applied Thai Traditional Medicine; Clinical Laboratory Science; Clinical Psychology; Epidemiology; Forensic Science; Health Science Education; Immunology; Medical Biochemistry and Molecular Biology; Medical Bioinformatics; Medical Microbiology; Medical Physiology; Model Technology for Medical Education; Pharmacology; Prosthetics and Orthotics; Radiology; Transfusion Science	Applied Thai Traditional Medicine; Biomedical Science; Immunology; Medical Anatomy; Medical Biochemistry and Molecular Biology; Medical Microbiology; Medical Physiology; Pharmacology

Apart from regular programs, the Siriraj faculty also offers numerous resident specialty programs, sub-specialty programs, and fellowship programs.

As of the 2018 intake, 302 undergraduate medical students are accepted through a variety of categories

== Medical Museum ==
Siriraj Hospital has a number of exhibits in a Siriraj Medical Museum that is open from 9 am to 4 pm Monday to Saturday. The bulk of the exhibits are located on the second floor in the hospital's Adulayadejvikrom Building. They include a forensic medicine museum, displaying objects from homicide, suicide and accident cases, such as skulls, bones, skeletons, preserved body parts and organs, including the entire preserved body of a convicted murder. The skeleton of Dr. Songkran Niyomsane, who founded the forensic museum is displayed as well. The exhibit also contains the autopsy instruments that were used in the case of King Ananda Mahidol's mysterious death.

Other exhibitions are devoted to Thai traditional medicine, anatomy, prehistoric artifacts, rare diseases and parasitic organisms.

== Main Teaching Hospital ==
- Siriraj Hospital

== Affiliated Teaching Hospitals ==
- Bangkok
  - Lerdsin Hospital
  - Charoenkrung Pracharak Hospital
  - Nopparat Rajathanee Hospital
  - Somdech Phra Pinklao Hospital, Naval Medical Department
  - Taksin Hospital
  - Bangkok Metropolitan Administration General Hospital
  - Sirindhorn Hospital
- Provincial
  - Phra Nang Klao Hospital, Nonthaburi Province
  - Nakhon Pathom Hospital, Nakhon Pathom Province
  - Samut Sakhon Hospital, Samut Sakhon Province
  - Ban Phaeo General Hospital, Samut Sakhon Province
  - Krathum Baen Hospital, Samut Sakhon Province
  - Phaholpolpayuhasena Hospital, Kanchanaburi Province
  - Hua Hin Hospital, Prachuap Khiri Khan Province
  - Ratchaburi Hospital, Ratchaburi Province
  - Damnoen Saduak Hospital, Ratchaburi Province
  - Ban Pong Hospital, Ratchaburi Province
  - Photharam Hospital, Ratchaburi Province
  - Sawanpracharak Hospital, Nakhon Sawan Province
  - Buddhachinaraj Phitsanulok Hospital, Phitsanulok Province

== Non-teaching Hospitals Operated ==
- Siriraj Piyamaharajkarun Hospital
- Golden Jubilee Medical Center

== See also ==
- List of medical schools in Thailand
- Faculty of Medicine Ramathibodi Hospital, Mahidol University
- Mahidol University
