= College of Management, Mahidol University =

Business school in Bangkok, Thailand

- วิทยาลัยการจัดการ มหาวิทยาลัยมหิดล
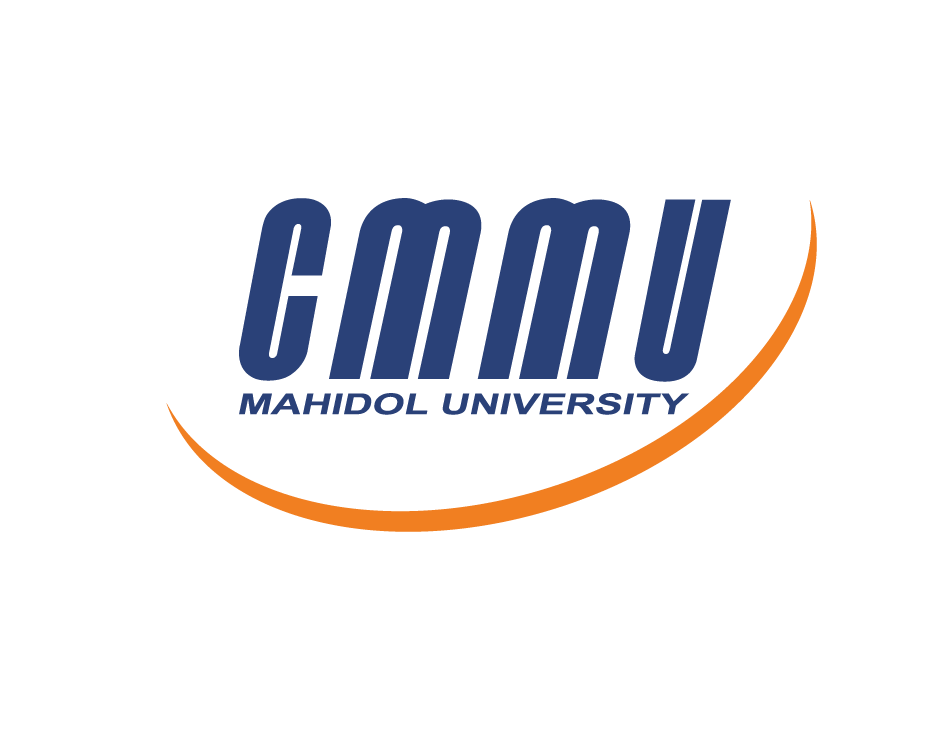
- Type: Public university
- Established: 1 October 1996
- Parent institution: Mahidol University
- Dean: Assoc. Prof. Dr. Prattana Punnakitikashem
- Location: 69 Thanon Vibhavadi Rangit, Samsen Nai Subdistrict, Phaya Thai District, Bangkok, 10400, Thailand
- Website: www.cmmu.mahidol.ac.th/cmmu/

College of Management, Mahidol University, also known as CMMU, is the business school of Mahidol University, located in Bangkok, Thailand. Established in 1997, CMMU offers Master's and Ph.D. degree programmes in management studies. CMMU is a member of AACSB and CMMU is now the FIRST business school in Thailand to be accredited by earning both AMBA and BGA accreditations.

== Programmes ==
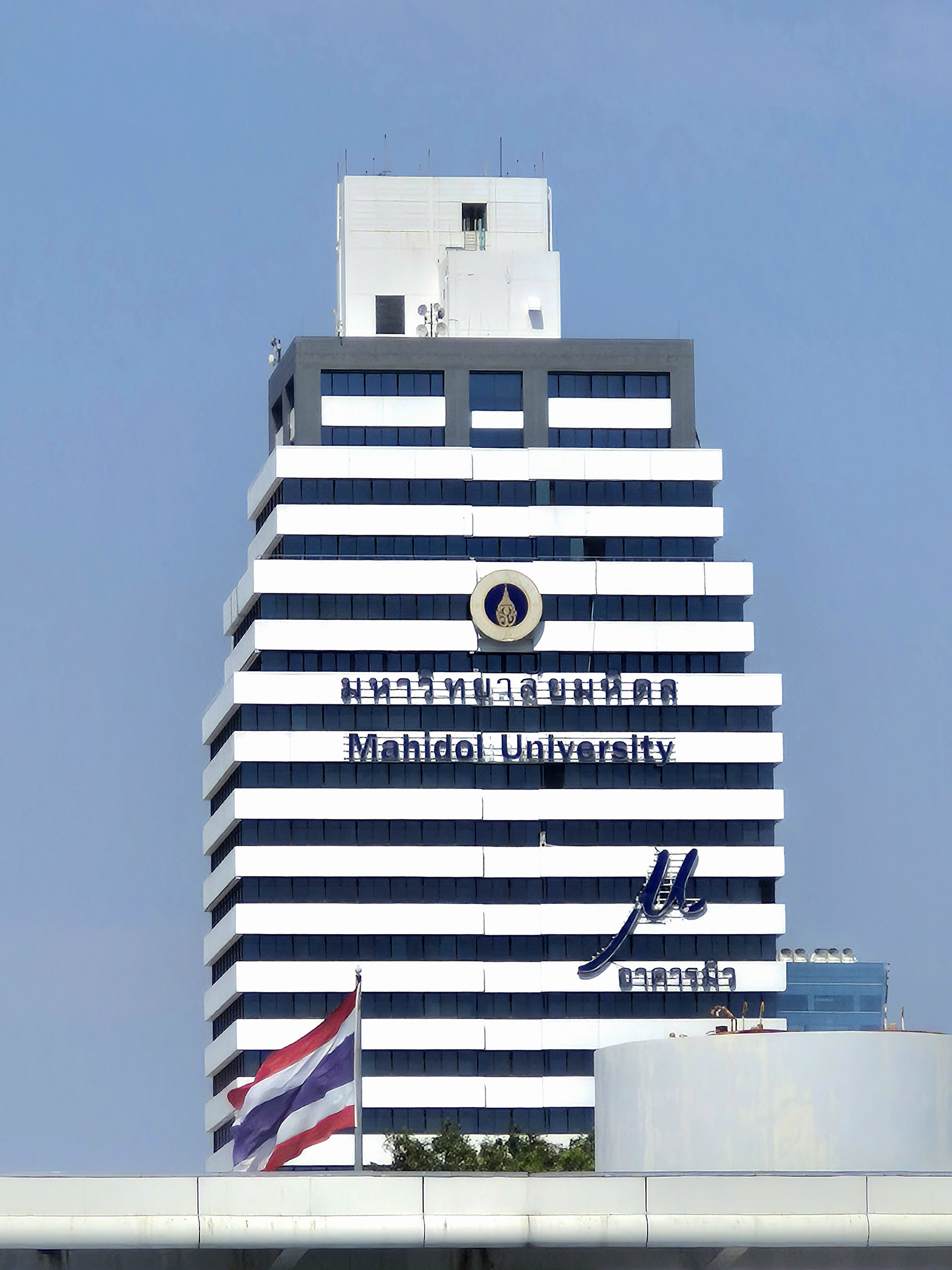
College of Management.

CMMU currently runs international and Thai programmes in various management disciplines.

=== International programmes ===
- Corporate Finance (CF)
- Entrepreneurship Management (EN)
- General Management (GM)
- Healthcare & Wellness Management (HWM)
- Marketing and Management (MM)
- Double Degree Int'L Program (GMDD)

=== Thai programmes ===
- สาขาการจัดการธุรกิจ (BM)
- สาขาภาวะผู้ประกอบการและนวัตกรรม (EI)
- สาขาทุนมนุษย์และการจัดการองค์กร (HO)
- สาขาการตลาด (MK)
- สาขาการเงิน (FN)
- สาขาการจัดการและกลยุทธ์ (MS)
- สาขาการจัดการธุรกิจสุขภาพ (HBM)

== International partnerships ==
The College of Management, Mahidol University works in partnership with a number of overseas universities. These partnerships provide opportunities for student exchanges with universities throughout Asia, Pacific, Europe and the Americas. These links allow eligible International Program students to study at one of these institutions for one semester. CMMU also offers double degree and second degree programs together with our international partners. For details of CMMU's international partners, please click at the links provided.

== Awards ==
Innovations that Inspire from AACSB (2023)

PRME Global Champion (2022)
