= Sawanpracharak Hospital =

Sawanpracharak Hospital โรงพยาบาลสวรรค์ประชารักษ์
- The Ministry of Public Health Health District 3

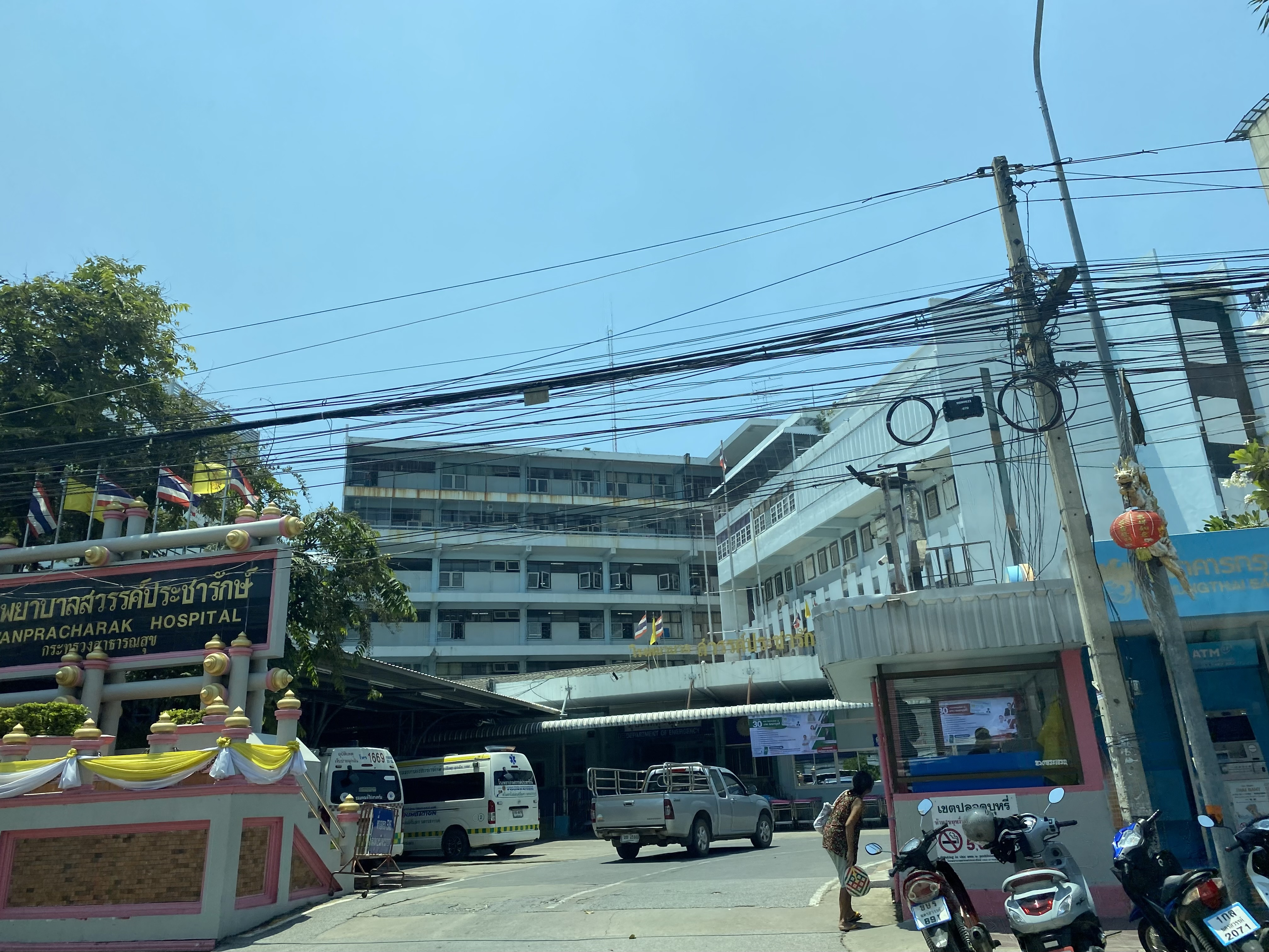

Geography
- Location: 43 Atthakawee Road, Pak Nam Pho Subdistrict, Mueang Nakhon Sawan District, Nakhon Sawan 60000, Thailand
- Coordinates: 15.706919°N 100.138421°E

Organisation
- Type: Regional
- Affiliated university: MOPH-Mahidol CPIRD Program; Faculty of Medicine Siriraj Hospital, Mahidol University

Services
- Beds: 858

History
- Former name: Sukhaphiban Mueang Nakhon Sawan Health Station Nakhon Sawan City Municipality Hospital Nakhon Sawan City Hospital
- Opened: 1931

Links
- Website: www.spr.go.th/index.php
- Lists: Hospitals in Thailand

Sawanpracharak Hospital (Thai: โรงพยาบาลสวรรค์ประชารักษ์) is the main hospital of Nakhon Sawan Province, Thailand and is classified under the Ministry of Public Health as a regional hospital. It has a CPIRD Medical Education Center which trains doctors for the MOPH-Mahidol CPIRD Program. It is an affiliated teaching hospital of the Faculty of Medicine Siriraj Hospital, Mahidol University.

== History ==
The Sukhaphiban Mueang Nakhon Sawan Health Station opened in 1931 to provide medical services for the sukhaphiban of Nakhon Sawan City. The name was then changed to Nakhon Sawan City Municipality Hospital, following a law passed to rearrange districts into municipalities. In 1950, the Ministry of Public Health took over hospital operations in regional areas from the Ministry of Interior and renamed the hospital Nakhon Sawan City Hospital, now with a capacity of 150 beds.

In 1965, the hospital received funding to expand the hospital to a capacity of 400 beds and purchase new medical equipment and this was completed in 1969. In 1970, King Bhumibol Adulyadej came to open the newly refurbished hospital and graciously conferred upon the name 'Sawanpracharak Hospital'.

== See also ==
- Healthcare in Thailand
- Hospitals in Thailand
- List of hospitals in Thailand
- Praboromarajchanok Medicine Program, Mahidol University
