= Princess Srisavangavadhana College of Medicine =

Medical school in Bangkok, Thailand

Coordinates: 13.878801°N 100.571251°E

- วิทยาลัยแพทยศาสตร์ศรีสวางควัฒน
- Type: Public (non-profit)
- Established: 18 April 2016; 10 years ago
- Parent institution: Chulabhorn Royal Academy
- Rector: Prof. Dr. Chirayu Auewarakul, M.D.
- Location: 906 Kamphaeng Phet 6 Road, Talat Bang Khen Subdistrict, Lak Si, Bangkok, Thailand
- Colors: Orange
- Website: pscm.cra.ac.th

The Princess Srisavangavadhana College of Medicine (PSCM) (Thai: วิทยาลัยแพทยศาสตร์ศรีสวางควัฒน), also informally shortened as "Chulabhorn" after the main associated hospital, Chulabhorn Hospital, is a medical school located in Bangkok, Thailand. It is a part of the Chulabhorn Royal Academy (CRA), named after Princess Chulabhorn Walailak.

== History ==
On 18 May 2015, a royal decree by Princess Chulabhorn established the "College of Medicine and Public Health" to be a college under the Chulabhorn Foundation, specialising in medicine and health sciences to increase the number of doctors and public health specialists in the country. With the establishment of the CRA in January 2016, this came into effect on 18 April 2016. The college was renamed "HRH Princess Chulabhorn College of Medical Science" (PCCMS) and management was transferred to the CRA on 1 April 2017. PCCMS ran undergraduate courses in medicine, nursing, health science technology and veterinary medicine.

The college was separated from PCCMS to become a distinct medical school and renamed again to "Princess Srisavangavadhana College of Medicine" on 29 October 2021, named after the new title bestowed upon the princess by King Vajiralongkorn (Rama X).

PSCM admits about 30 students per year in a 6-year Doctor of Medicine course affiliated with Mahidol University, and runs in conjunction with the Faculty of Medicine Ramathibodi Hospital, Mahidol University. This agreement ran for the first five medical student cohorts of the college and is no longer accepting new applicants.

Since 2019, the CRA entered into an academic collaboration with UCL to access expertise to support the development and delivery of a high quality, contemporary undergraduate medicine programme. The PSCM-UCL Joint Program involves the completion of the intercalated BSc in the fourth year at UCL.

Since the 2022 academic year, the college has also partnered with the University of Newcastle (Australia) for a BSc/BEng program.

== Teaching hospitals ==
- Chulabhorn Hospital
- Police General Hospital
- Nakhon Pathom Hospital

== See also ==
- List of medical schools in Thailand
