= Thailand Philharmonic Orchestra =

Thai symphony orchestra

Thailand Philharmonic Orchestra (TPO)
- Orchestra
- Founded: 2005
- Location: Phutthamonthon, Nakhon Pathom (Greater Bangkok), Thailand
- Website: www.thailandphil.com

The Thailand Philharmonic Orchestra (TPO) is a Thai orchestra based in Bangkok. The TPO operates in partnership with the College of Music, Mahidol University in Salaya, and is resident at the college's Prince Mahidol Hall.

== History ==
The TPO was founded in 2005, with Gudni Emilsson as its founding chief conductor. Emilsson served as chief conductor until 2017.

Alfonso Scarano was principal guest conductor of the TPO from 2011 to 2017. Scarano succeeded Emilsson as chief conductor in 2017. During his tenure, the TPO became the first Thai orchestra to tour Europe, in August-September 2022. Scarano remained in the post until 2024.

In 2019, Carl St.Clair first guest-conducted the TPO. In September 2025, the TPO announced the appointment of St.Clair as its new music director.

== Conductors in leadership positions ==
- Gudni Emilsson (2005–2017, chief conductor)
- Alfonso Scarano (2017–2024, chief conductor)
- Carl St.Clair (2025–present, music director)
