= Sukhaphiban =

Sukhaphiban (Thai: สุขาภิบาล, pronounced [sùʔ.kʰǎː.pʰíʔ.bāːn]; translated as "sanitary district") were administrative divisions of Thailand.

Sanitary districts were the first sub-autonomous entities established in Thailand. A first such district was created in Bangkok by a royal decree of King Chulalongkorn in 1897. The king had learned about the sanitary districts in England during his European trip earlier that year, and he wanted to try this local administration in his country as well. Tha Chalom District became the second such district, created in 1906 and responsible for parts of Mueang Samut Sakhon District, Samut Sakhon Province. In 1907 the act on operations of sanitary districts codified the regulations, and with the Local Administration Act of 1914 two levels of sukhaphiban were introduced, the sukhaphiban mueang for towns and sukhaphiban tambon for rural areas.

The number of sanitary districts grew to 35 in 1935, when these however were converted into municipalities (thesaban). New sanitary district were again established starting in 1952 by prime minister Phibun Songkhram. With the Act to Upgrade Sanitary Districts to Thesaban of May 1999 they were again abolished, and all became thesaban tambon.

As the name suggests, the main task of the sanitary districts are sanitation projects. The districts were administered by a sanitation committee, which consisted of kamnan (tambon headmen), village headmen, and also local merchants. It was financed by a housing tax on local residents.

== See also ==
- Mueang
