= Praboromarajchanok Institute =

Organization in Nonthaburi, Thailand

- สถาบันพระบรมราชชนก
- Former names: Institute for Health Workforce Development
- Type: Public
- Established: 1993
- Parent institution: Ministry of Public Health
- Chair: Permanent Secretary of the Ministry of Public Health
- Chancellor: Professor Dr. Vichai Tienthavorn, M.D.
- Location: Ministry of Public Health, Tiwanon Road, Talad Kwan, Meaung, Nonthaburi, 11000, Thailand; 13.850242°N 100.528228°E
- Campus: Multiple campuses
- Colours: Blue
- Website: pi.ac.th

Praboromarajchanok Institute (Thai: สถาบันพระบรมราชชนก) is a public higher education institute for production of public health workforce under the Ministry of Public Health in Thailand. It named after the father of modern medicine and public health in Thailand, Prince Mahidol of Songkhla.

== History ==
The institute was initially established in 1993 by Royal Decree as the "Institute for Health Workforce Development" (Thai: สถาบันพัฒนากำลังคนด้านสาธารณสุข) under the Office of the Permanent Secretary, Ministry of Public Health which later renamed it as "Praboromarajchanok Institute" in 1995. The institute aims to produce and develop a workforce to serve the shortage of healthcare personnel of the Ministry of Public Health, educate and promote academic and profession, teach, research, provide social services, as well as to support religion, arts, culture, environment, and sports. In order to increase efficiency, the parliament enacted the Praboromarajchanok Institute Act B.E. 2562, giving it official higher educational institute status and more freedom in its administration.
