= Maharaj Nakhon Si Thammarat Hospital =

Maharaj Nakhon Si Thammarat Hospital โรงพยาบาลมหาราชนครศรีธรรมราช
- The Ministry of Public Health Health District 11

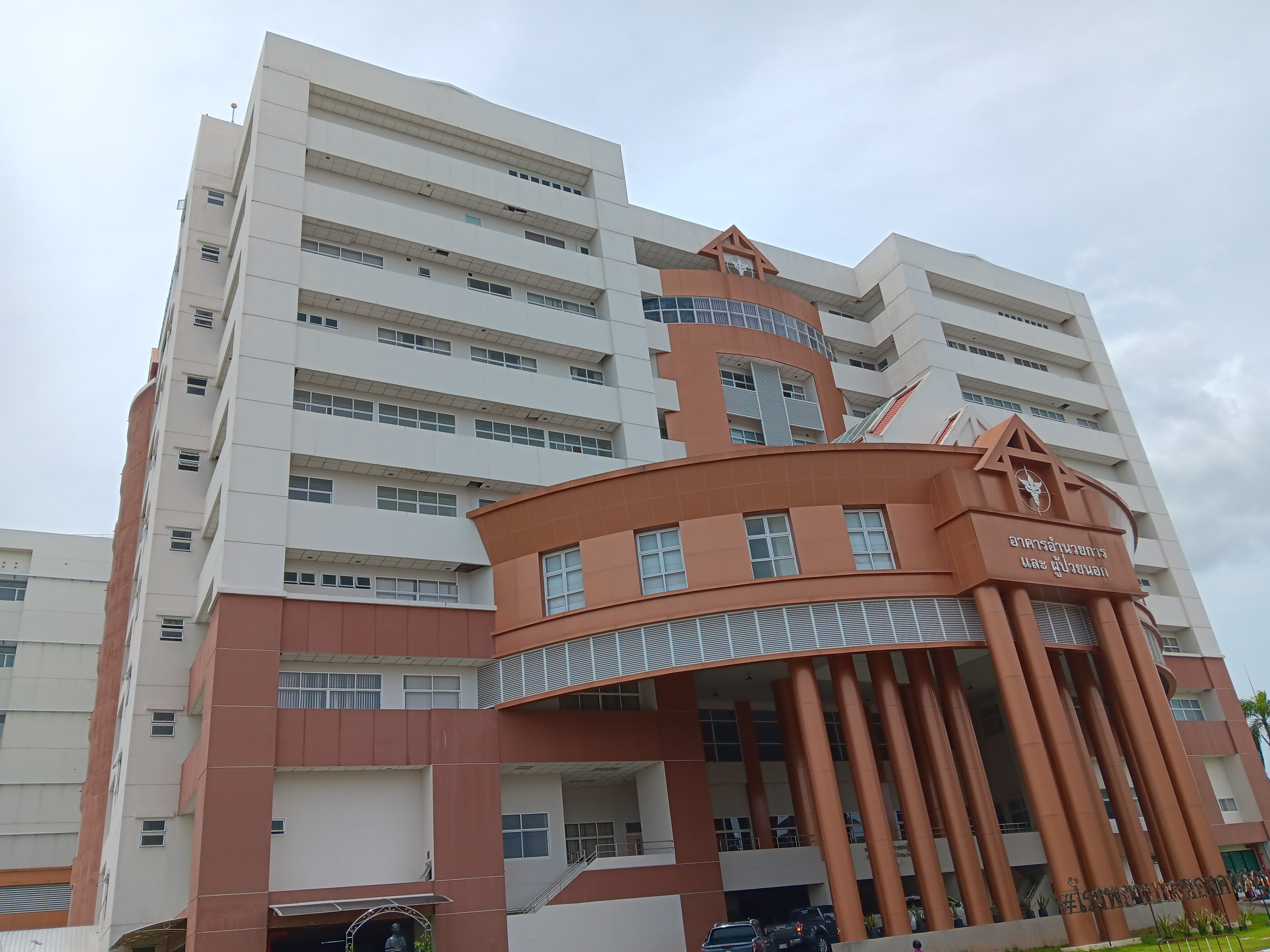
- Out Patient Building

Geography
- Location: 198 Ratchadamnoen Road, Nai Mueang Subdistrict, Mueang Nakhon Si Thammarat District, Nakhon Si Thammarat 80000, Thailand
- Coordinates: 8.390019°N 99.971419°E

Organisation
- Type: Regional
- Affiliated university: MOPH-Mahidol CPIRD Program; Faculty of Medicine, Prince of Songkla University

Services
- Beds: 844

History
- Former name: Nakhon Si Thammarat Hospital
- Founded: 24 June 1953

Links
- Website: www.mnst.go.th/mnst/index.php
- Lists: Hospitals in Thailand

Maharaj Nakhon Si Thammarat Hospital (Thai: โรงพยาบาลมหาราชนครศรีธรรมราช) is the main hospital of Nakhon Si Thammarat Province, Thailand and is classified under the Ministry of Public Health as a regional hospital. It has a CPIRD Medical Education Center which trains doctors for the MOPH-Mahidol CPIRD Program. It is an affiliated teaching hospital of the Faculty of Medicine, Prince of Songkla University.

== History ==
The construction of Nakhon Si Thammarat Hospital started in 1952 on a 37 rai piece of land owned by Prince Yugala Dighambara, Prince of Lopburi that was location of the Pho Yai Rot Palace, his place of residence when he was viceroy of the South. In his honour, the first building was named 'Yugala Dighambara' Building. The hospital opened on 24 June 1953 with 25 beds and 2 doctors. Over time, the hospital was expanded until capacity reached 400 beds.

In 1978, under the prime ministership of Kriangsak Chamanan, approved for the rapid construction of a 1000-bed hospital in Nakhon Si Thammarat and the hospital was renamed Maharaj Nakhon Si Thammarat Hospital in honour of King Bhumibol Adulyadej and in commemoration of the Rattanakosin Bicentennial. Maharaj Nakhon Si Thammarat Hospital was selected by the government of Japan in 1979 to provide assistance in construction and medical technology and equipment in the new hospital. This began in 1980 and finished completely in 1983, with a total investment of 360 million Baht. The new hospital was opened on 12 September 1982 by King Vajiralongkorn (then Crown Prince).

== See also ==
- Healthcare in Thailand
- Hospitals in Thailand
- List of hospitals in Thailand
- Praboromarajchanok Medicine Program, Mahidol University
