= Ratchaburi Hospital =

Ratchaburi Hospital โรงพยาบาลราชบุรี
- The Ministry of Public Health Health District 5

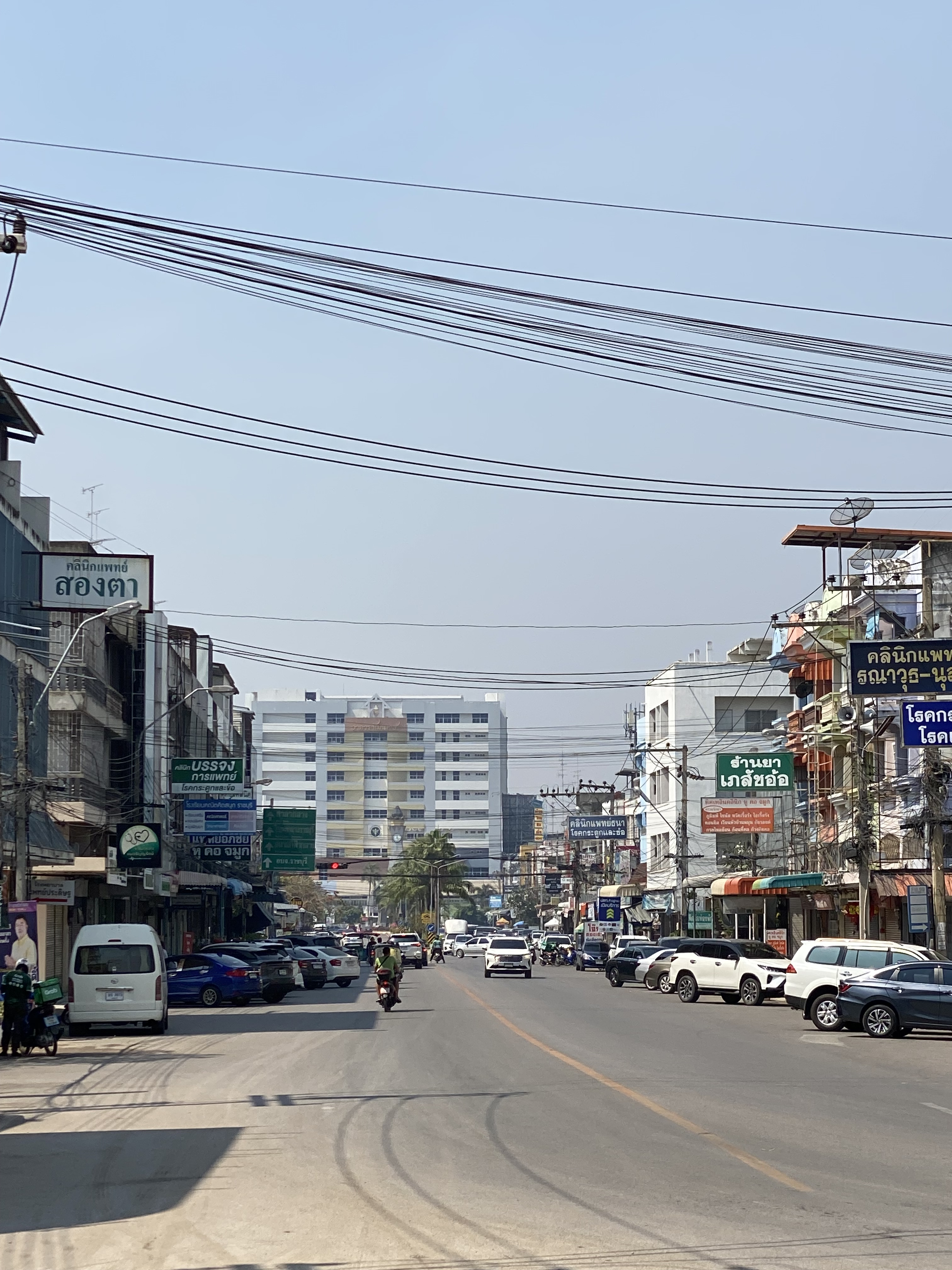

Geography
- Location: Mueang Ratchaburi District, Ratchaburi, Thailand
- Coordinates: 13.531165°N 99.815458°E

Organisation
- Type: Regional
- Affiliated university: MOPH-Mahidol CPIRD Program; Faculty of Medicine Siriraj Hospital, Mahidol University

Services
- Beds: 855

History
- Opened: 1 July 1941

Links
- Website: www.rajburi.org
- Lists: Hospitals in Thailand

Ratchaburi Hospital (Thai: โรงพยาบาลราชบุรี) is the main hospital of Ratchaburi Province, Thailand. It is classified by the Ministry of Public Health as a regional hospital. It has a Collaborative Project to Increase Production of Rural Doctors (CPIRD) Medical Education Center which trains doctors for the MOPH-Mahidol CPIRD Program.

== History ==
The foundation stone for Ratchaburi Hospital was laid on 2 April 1941 and the hospital opened in 1941, consisting of a small patient building, doctor's lodgings, and a kitchen. Initially, the hospital had a capacity of 25 beds. The hospital was later expanded and between 1951 and 1952, hospital operations were transferred to the Ministry of Public Health.

On 30 September 2003, the hospital received ISO 9002:20031 accreditation and in 2006 received HA (Hospital Accreditation). Ratchaburi Hospital operates 855 beds (plus 40 ICU beds) (2018).

== See also ==
- Healthcare in Thailand
- Hospitals in Thailand
- List of hospitals in Thailand
- Praboromarajchanok Medicine Program, Mahidol University
