= Faculty of Science, Mahidol University =

Faculty within Mahidol University, Bangkok, Thailand

Faculty of Science Mahidol University
- คณะวิทยาศาสตร์ มหาวิทยาลัยมหิดล
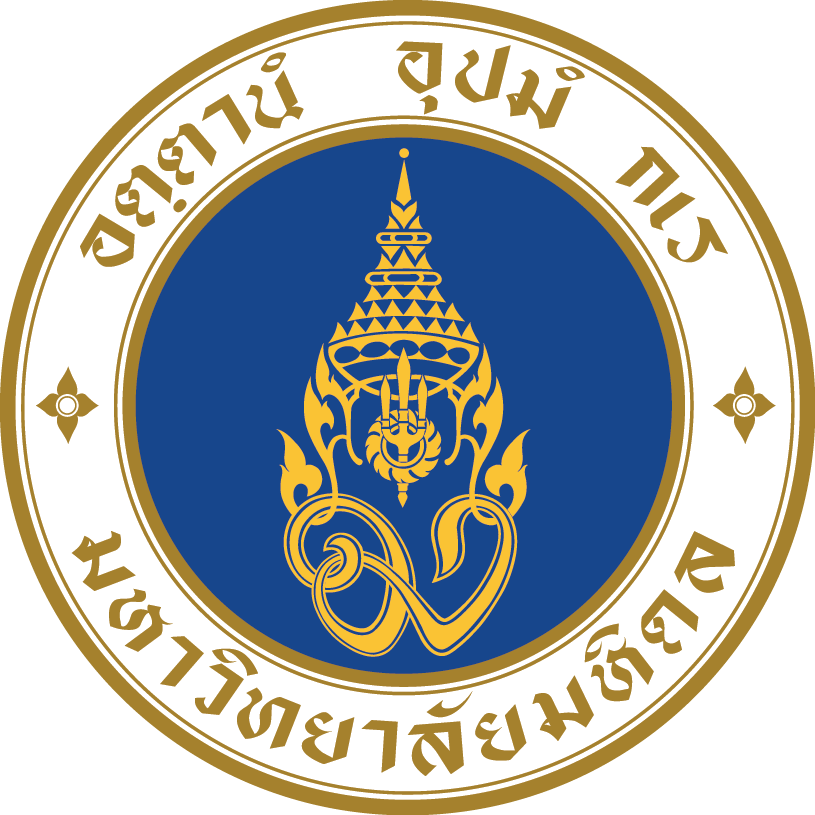
- Type: Public
- Established: 1958
- Dean: Prasit Suwannalert
- Administrative staff: 813
- Students: 2,803
- Location: Bangkok and Nakhon Pathom Province, Thailand
- Campus: Urban
- Colors
- Website: Faculty of Science, Mahidol University

The Faculty of Science was founded as a Pre-medical School in 1958 by Stang Mongkolsuk, and was named as Faculty of Science, Mahidol University in 1969. The Faculty is located in Thanon Rama VI, Bangkok, Thailand. Currently, the Faculty consists of 12 departments: Anatomy, Biochemistry, Biology, Biotechnology, Chemistry, Mathematics, Microbiology, Pathobiology, Pharmacology, Physics, Physiology, and Plant Science. There are approximately 310 academic staff, with 170 being at doctoral level, 100 at Master’s level, and 40 at Bachelor’s level.

== See also ==
- List of universities in Thailand
