= Phramongkutklao Hospital =

Coordinates: 13.767407°N 100.534178°E

Phramongkutklao Hospital โรงพยาบาลพระมงกุฎเกล้า
- The Royal Thai Army

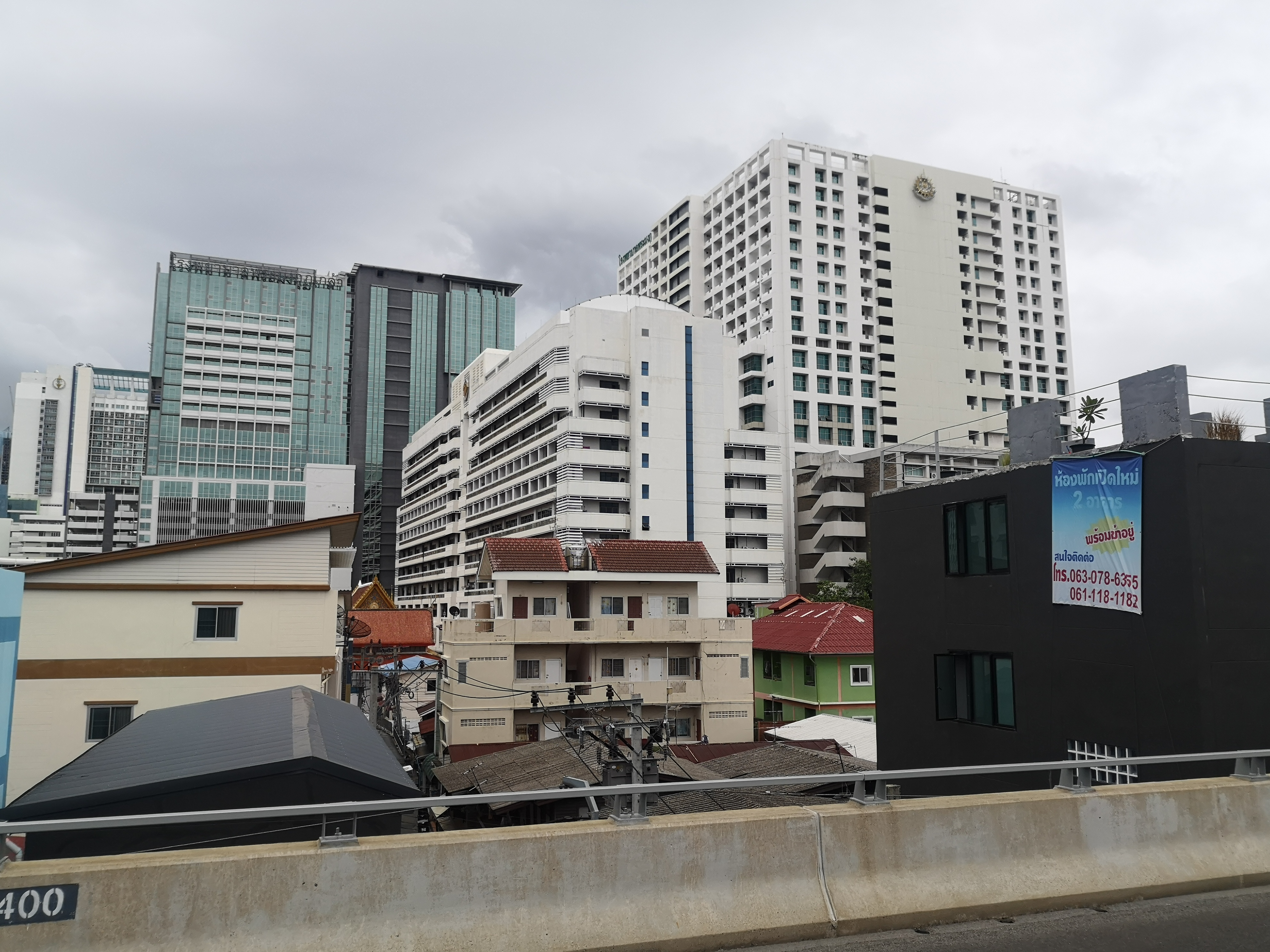

Geography
- Location: 315 Ratchawithi Road, Thung Phayathai Subdistrict, Ratchathewi, Bangkok, Thailand

Organisation
- Type: Teaching, Military
- Affiliated university: Phramongkutklao College of Medicine; Royal Thai Army Nursing College

Services
- Beds: 1200

History
- Former name: Army Hospital
- Founded: 26 November 1932

Links
- Website: www.pmk.ac.th

Phramongkutklao Hospital (Thai: โรงพยาบาลพระมงกุฎเกล้า) is a hospital located in Ratchathewi District, Bangkok, Thailand. It is a military hospital for the Royal Thai Army and a teaching hospital for Phramongkutklao College of Medicine which trains doctors for the Royal Thai Armed Forces, as well as the Royal Thai Army Nursing College.

== History ==
After the Siamese revolution of 1932 which changed Thailand from an absolute monarchy into a constitutional monarchy, Maj. Luang Thurawaithayawiset, chief doctor of the forces based at Paruskavan Palace, sought to find a medical facility to treat and care for army soldiers and thus proposed to Col. Phraya Songsuradet to find a location. Three locations were surveyed: Phaya Thai Palace, Bang Khun Phrom Palace and the Army Survey Department. The location was finally settled at Phaya Thai Palace and King Prajadhipok approved of this project. Medical Corps Group 1 (Pak Khlong Lot) and Medical Corps Group 2 (Bang Sue) were then merged into the 'Bangkok Military District Medical Corps', with Lt. Col. Luang Winitwetchakarn as commander. The facility was opened on 26 November 1932 as the 'Bangkok Military District Medical Corps Division' and was attended by Gen. Phraya Phahonphonphayuhasena and was used as the headquarters for the medical corps. The facility was developed with assistance from the Faculty of Medicine, Chulalongkorn University and Faculty of Medicine Siriraj Hospital. By 1933, the name was changed to 'Military District 1 Medical Corps Division'.

During World War II, the hospital was closed to general patient admissions and was used solely as a military hospital. After the war, the need for an improved quality of care as well as increased education for military medicine was highlighted. On 1 January 1946, the division became the 'Army Hospital' and operations were transferred directly to the Army Medical Department. The hospital also reopened back for public use. On 8 August 1952, the hospital was renamed 'Phramongkutklao Hospital', in following the name of King Vajiravudh, who had built Phaya Thai Palace.

On 22 May 2017, Phramongkutklao Hospital was bombed, causing 21 injuries. This day was exactly three years after the 2014 Thai coup d'état.

The hospital is under the patronage of Princess Bajrakitiyabha.

== Facilities ==
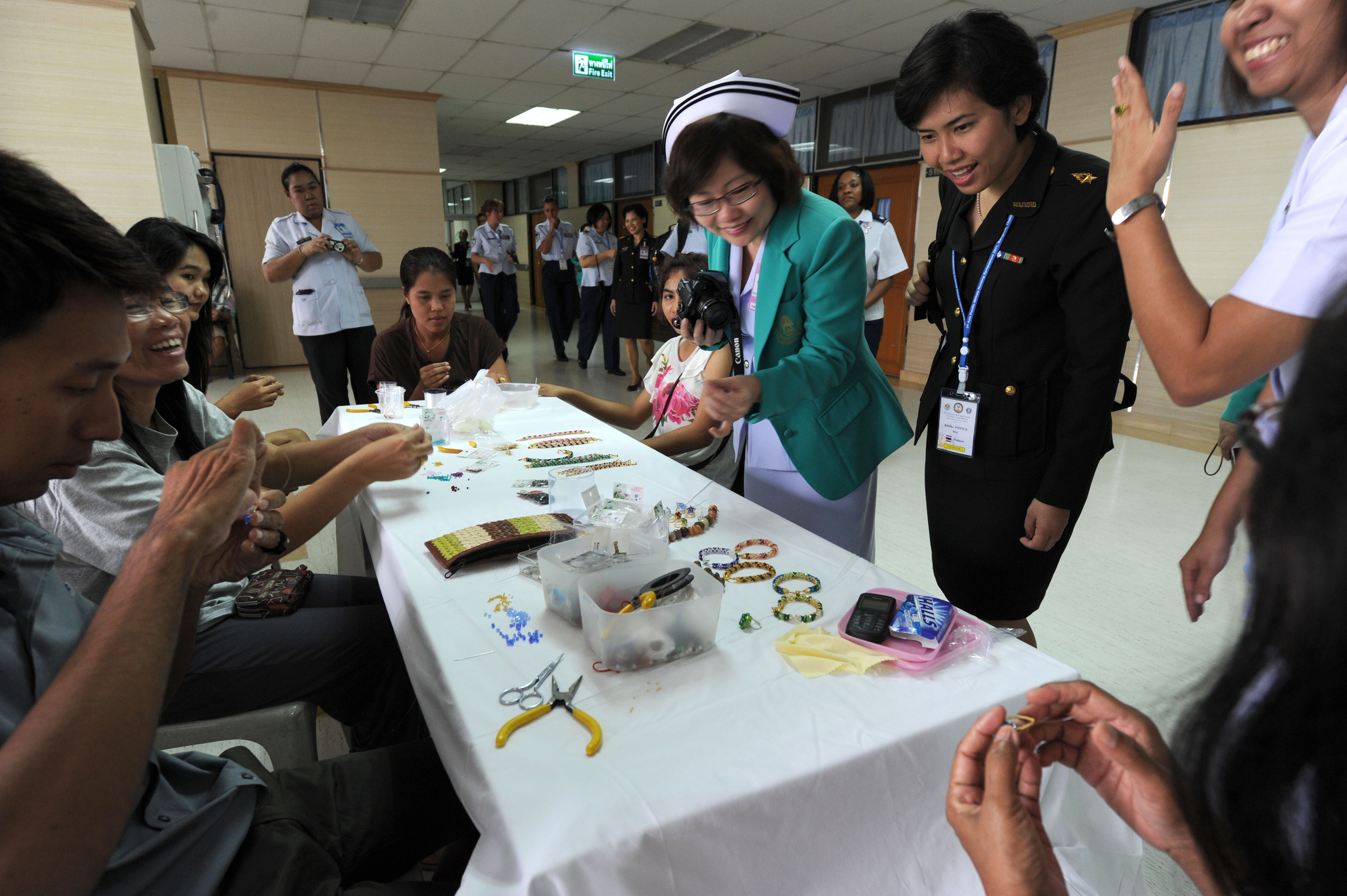
Members of the military nursing community in the Pacific region watched as family members of a patient at Phramongkutklao Hospital

Phramongkutklao Hospital operates a number of Centers of Excellence including:

- Cancer Center
- Trauma Center
- Sirindhorn Heart Center
- Organ Transplantation Center
- Military Medicine Center
- Medical Company

== See also ==
- Healthcare in Thailand
- Hospitals in Thailand
- List of hospitals in Thailand
