= Phramongkutklao College of Medicine =

Military medical school in Thailand

- วิทยาลัยแพทยศาสตร์พระมงกุฎเกล้า
- Former name: The Army Medic School
- Type: Military Academy, Medical School
- Established: 16 June 1975
- Parent institution: The Royal Thai Army
- Academic affiliations: Mahidol University
- Dean: Maj. Gen. Sukchai Sattaporn, M.D.
- Location: Bangkok, Thailand
- Campus: Urban
- Colors: Official Blue (THAITONE call "sī khāp"); Unofficial Purple (Lagerstroemia Flower)
- Website: pcm.ac.th

Phramongkutklao College of Medicine (Thai: วิทยาลัยแพทยศาสตร์พระมงกุฎเกล้า) is a medical school in Bangkok, Thailand affiliated with Mahidol University. The college is the seventh medical school established in Thailand and the only medical school in the country to train medical personnel of the Royal Thai Armed Forces. Due to its military status, the school only accepts students whose parents are both natural born citizens.

== History ==
In 1939 the government of Thailand approved the establishment of the "Army Medic School." The Army Medic School trained doctors serving in the Royal Thai Army until 1947 when the program was halted due to a lack of equipment and educators.

The idea of reopening the school appeared in various times from 1947 to 1973, but was rejected due to a lack of readiness. However, in 1973, in King Bhumibol Adulyadej's speech to medical students at Siriraj Hospital, the idea of reestablishing a medical cadet school was revived. On October 3, 1973, the Royal Thai Army approved the establishment of a "Medical Cadet College," which was renamed "Phramongkutklao College of Medicine" one year later. The name "Phramongkutklao" was granted by King Bhumibol Adulyadej. It was the regal name of King Vajiravudh, King Bhumibol Adulyadej's uncle. The college was officially established on the 16th of June in 1975.

== Education ==
Phramongkutklao College admits around 100 medical military cadets per academic year through the Consortium of Thai Medical Schools Examination (กสพท). The course of study is separated into three parts over six years. In the first (pre-medical) year, cadets study at the Faculty of Science, Kasetsart University. In the second and third (preclinical) years, cadets study at the college, while the clinical years (fourth, fifth and sixth) is taught at Phramongkutklao Hospital. The military training component is provided by the Chulachomklao Royal Military Academy.

Graduates from Phramongkutklao College of Medicine can apply for Royal Thai Army, Royal Thai Navy, Royal Thai Air Force, Royal Thai Armed Forces Headquarters as military doctors or for Ministry of Public Health (Thailand) as civilian doctors.

== Departments ==
Pre-clinical years

- Department of Anatomy
- Department of Biochemistry
- Department of Microbiology
- Department of Pathology
- Department of Parasitology
- Department of Pharmacology
- Department of Physiology
- Department of Military and Community Medicine

Clinical years

- Department of Pediatrics
- Department of Ophthalmology
- Department of Psychiatry
- Department of Obstetrics Gynecology
- Department of Anesthesia
- Department of Rehabilitation Medicine
- Department of Emergency Medicine
- Department of Radiology
- Department of Surgery
- Department of Orthopaedic surgery
- Department of Medicine
- Department of Family Medicine
- Department of Otolaryngology
- Department of Forensic Medicine

== Main Teaching Hospital ==
- Phramongkutklao Hospital

== Affiliated Teaching Hospitals ==
- Military
  - Ananda Mahidol Hospital, Royal Thai Army, Lopburi Province
  - Fort Suranari Hospital, Royal Thai Army, Nakhon Ratchasima Province
  - Bhumibol Adulyadej Hospital, Royal Thai Air Force, Bangkok
  - Queen Sirikit Naval Hospital, Royal Thai Navy, Chonburi Province
- Bangkok Metropolitan Administration
  - Charoenkrung Pracharak Hospital
- Ministry of Public Health
  - Nopparat Rajathanee Hospital, Bangkok
  - Phra Nakhon Si Ayutthaya Hospital, Phra Nakhon Si Ayutthaya Province
  - Chonburi Hospital, Chonburi Province
  - Maharat Nakhon Ratchasima Hospital, Nakhon Ratchasima Province

== See also ==
- List of medical schools in Thailand
