= Phra Nakhon Si Ayutthaya Hospital =

Coordinates: 14.343867°N 100.560136°E

Phra Nakhon Si Ayutthaya Hospital โรงพยาบาลพระนครศรีอยุธยา
- The Ministry of Public Health Health District 4

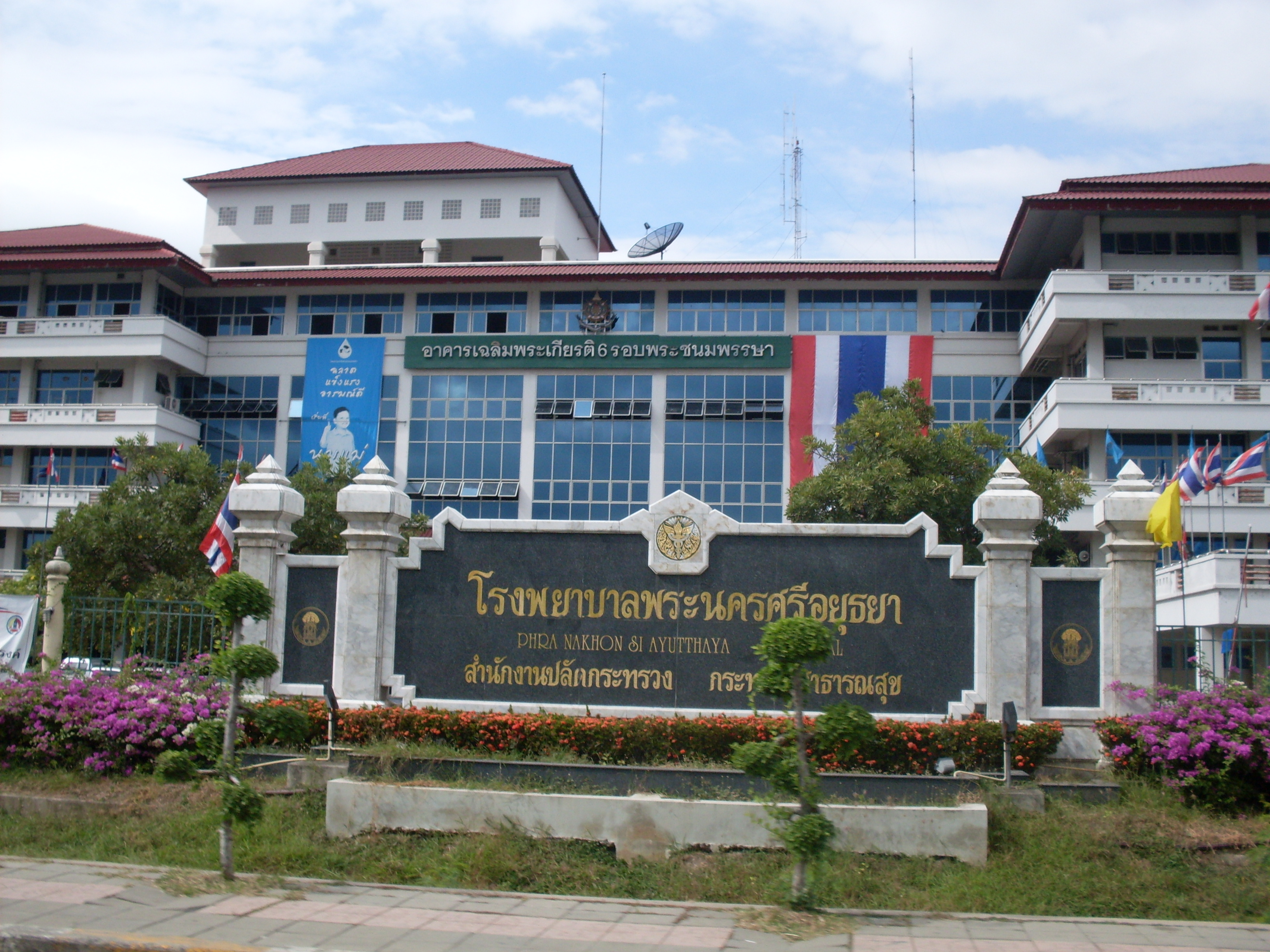

Geography
- Location: 46/1 Mu 4, U Thong Road, Pratu Chai Subdistrict, Phra Nakhon Si Ayutthaya District, Phra Nakhon Si Ayutthaya 13000, Thailand

Organisation
- Type: Regional
- Affiliated university: Faculty of Medicine Ramathibodi Hospital, Mahidol University; Phramongkutklao College of Medicine

Services
- Beds: 524

History
- Former name: Panchamathirachuthit Hospital
- Founded: 1940

Links
- Website: www.ayhosp.go.th/ayh/
- Lists: Hospitals in Thailand

Phra Nakhon Si Ayutthaya Hospital (Thai: โรงพยาบาลพระนครศรีอยุธยา) is the main hospital of Phra Nakhon Si Ayutthaya Province, Thailand and is classified under the Ministry of Public Health as a regional hospital. It is an affiliated hospital of the Faculty of Medicine Ramathibodi Hospital, Mahidol University and Phramongkutklao College of Medicine.

== History ==
After the death of King Chulalongkorn in 1910, the local authorities and citizens funded for a hospital in memory of King Chulalongkorn and this was known as "Panchamathirat Uthit Hospital" (โรงพยาบาลปัญจมาธิราชอุทิศ). In 1939, the Ministry of Public Health planned for the construction of a new hospital and construction started the following year, initially with one OPD building. Most patients came by water transport, and thus in 1942, a canal was dug from the Chao Phraya River surrounding Ayutthaya's old town to the hospital.

In 1990, the hospital had a major renovation led by then Minister of Public Health, Boonpan Kaewattana under Chuan Leekpai's cabinet. The hospital was flooded in October 1995 which significantly damaged hospital property. Aid such as water pumps were provided by King Bhumibol Adulyadej and King Vajiralongkorn (then crown prince) to reduce the effects of the flood.

== See also ==
- Healthcare in Thailand
- Hospitals in Thailand
- List of hospitals in Thailand
