= Vichai Sangprapai =

Thai politician (born 1955)

- วิชัย สังข์ประไพ
- Born: 16 January 1955 (age 71); Sena, Ayutthaya, Thailand
- Other names: Commander Taem; Black-Eared Buster
- Education: Ayutthaya Shipbuilding Industry and Technology College
- Alma mater: Metropolitan Police School; Sripatum University; National Institute of Development Administration
- Occupations: Police; Politician
- Notable work: Chief of Metropolitan Police Division 1 Deputy Chief of Metropolitan Police Bureau
- Title: Police Major General (Pol Maj Gen)
- Political party: Democrat (since 2018)
- Spouse: Tippawan Sangprapai

Pol Maj Gen Vichai Sangprapai (also spelled Wichai Sangprapai; Thai: วิชัย สังข์ประไพ; born: January 16, 1955) is a Thai politician, who is the former deputy chief of Metropolitan Police Bureau and chief of Metropolitan Police Division 1.

== Biography & career ==
Sangprapai was born into a poor farm family at Sena district, Phra Nakhon Si Ayutthaya province. He had wanted to be a soldier since childhood, but could not enter the Armed Forces Academies Preparatory School, so he became a police officer, starting as a non-commissioned officer and eventually attaining the rank of commissioner.

He was widely known as chief of Metropolitan Police Division 1 and deputy chief of Metropolitan Police Bureau, by being a police buster. He earned the alias "Black-Eared Buster" (มือปราบหูดำ) owing to his left ear has a black birthmark, but the general people colloquially him as "Commander Taem" (ผู้การแต้ม) according to his nickname.

Later in the middle of 2012, he resigned from his police career. In early 2013, he was appointed as advisor to the Bangkok Governor MR Sukhumbhand Paribatra but resigned in early 2016 due to a party conflict.

On November 26, 2018, he applied for membership of the Democrat Party and was elected to be a candidate for the House of Representatives Bangkok's 9nd constituency, consisting of Lak Si and some sub-districts of Chatuchak (Lat Yao, Sena Nikhom, Chan Kasem) in the general election on March 24, 2019. He was not elected when he lost to Sira Jenjaka Palang Pracharath Party candidate.

In addition to his police and political careers, Sangprapai is also the owner of the Muaythai gym Wor Sangprapai (ว.สังข์ประไพ), many of whose kickboxers have won championships of Rajadamnern and Lumpinee Stadiums, such as Phetmorakot Wor Sangprapai etc. He formerly was chairman of the Nonthaburi F.C. as well.

== Royal decorations ==
Sangprapai has received the following royal decorations in the Honours System of Thailand:

- Knight Grand Cross (First Class) of the Most Noble Order of the Crown of Thailand
- Knight Grand Cross (First Class) of the Most Exalted Order of the White Elephant
