= King Chulalongkorn Memorial Hospital =

King Chulalongkorn Memorial Hospital โรงพยาบาลจุฬาลงกรณ์
- The Thai Red Cross Society
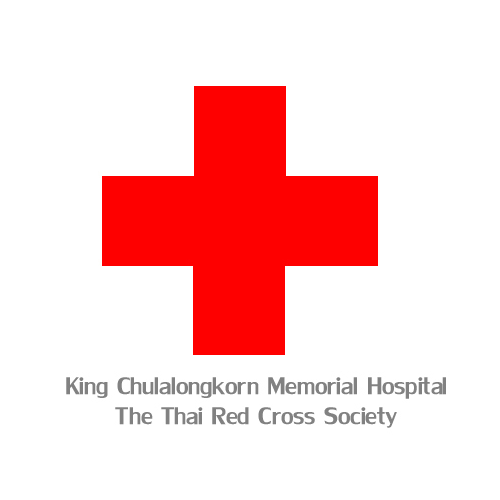

- KCMH complex as seen from Dusit Central Park in 2025

Geography
- Location: Pathum Wan, Bangkok, Thailand
- Coordinates: 13°43′53″N 100°32′08″E

Organisation
- Care system: National Health Insurance System
- Type: Teaching
- Affiliated university: Faculty of Medicine, Chulalongkorn University Srisavarindhira Thai Red Cross Institute of Nursing

Services
- Standards: Hospital Accreditation (Institute of Hospital Quality Improvement & Accreditation, Thailand)
- Emergency department: Yes
- Beds: 1,442

History
- Founded: 30 May 1914; 112 years ago

Links
- Website: chulalongkornhospital.go.th

King Chulalongkorn Memorial Hospital (KCMH, Thai: โรงพยาบาลจุฬาลงกรณ์; RTGS: Rongphayaban Chulalongkon) is a public general and tertiary referral hospital in Bangkok, Thailand. It is operated by the Thai Red Cross Society, and serves as the teaching hospital for the Faculty of Medicine, Chulalongkorn University and Srisavarindhira Thai Red Cross Institute of Nursing. With an in-patient capacity of 1,435 beds, it is one of the largest hospitals in Thailand, and as one of Thailand's leading medical school affiliates, is widely considered one of the best public hospitals in the country, along with Siriraj Hospital and Ramathibodi Hospital.

== History ==
The founding of the hospital was first proposed by King Vajiravudh, who, having observed the operations of the Red Cross Hospital of Japan during his travels, thought it beneficial to establish a hospital in the service of the Red Cross (then the Red Unalom Society). The hospital, named in honour of King Chulalongkorn, was founded through donations by King Vajiravudh and his brothers and sisters, together with the society's funds. The hospital was opened by King Vajiravudh on 30 May 1914.

King Ananda Mahidol aimed to increase physician in Thailand because at that time Thailand is under post–World War II period. Government of Thailand intentionally tried to find another hospital which is ready to be the second medical school of Thailand and finally they should King Chulalongkorn Memorial Hospital of the Thai Red Cross Society. On 4 June 1947, Affiliation with Faculty of Medicine, Chulalongkorn University was established.

The hospital was damaged during the 2025 Myanmar earthquake.

== Facilities ==
Today, the hospital provides general and specialized medical services through its dentistry, forensic medicine, internal medicine, orthopedics, pediatrics, preventive medicine, psychiatry, obstetrics and gynecology, ophthalmology, otolaryngology, radiology and surgery clinics. It also operates five specialized medical service centers, namely: Cardiac Center, Glaucoma Imaging & Diagnostic Center, Excimer Laser Center, Chulalongkorn Craniofacial Center, and the Queen Sirikit Center for Breast Cancer. It serves as the office of many WHO Collaborating Centres in Thailand.

In 2007, ground was broken for the hospital's Bhumisirimangkalanusorn Building — claimed to be the largest medical hub in ASEAN, is a 12.5-billion baht (US$376 million) 29-storey facility. It was jointly financed by the state and the Thai Red Cross Society. The new addition opened on a partial basis in 2016 and is due to be fully inaugurated by the end of 2017. It has over 1,250 beds. Fully operational, it will house over 1,600 physicians and 2,100 nurses.

Building in King Chulalongkorn Memorial Hospital

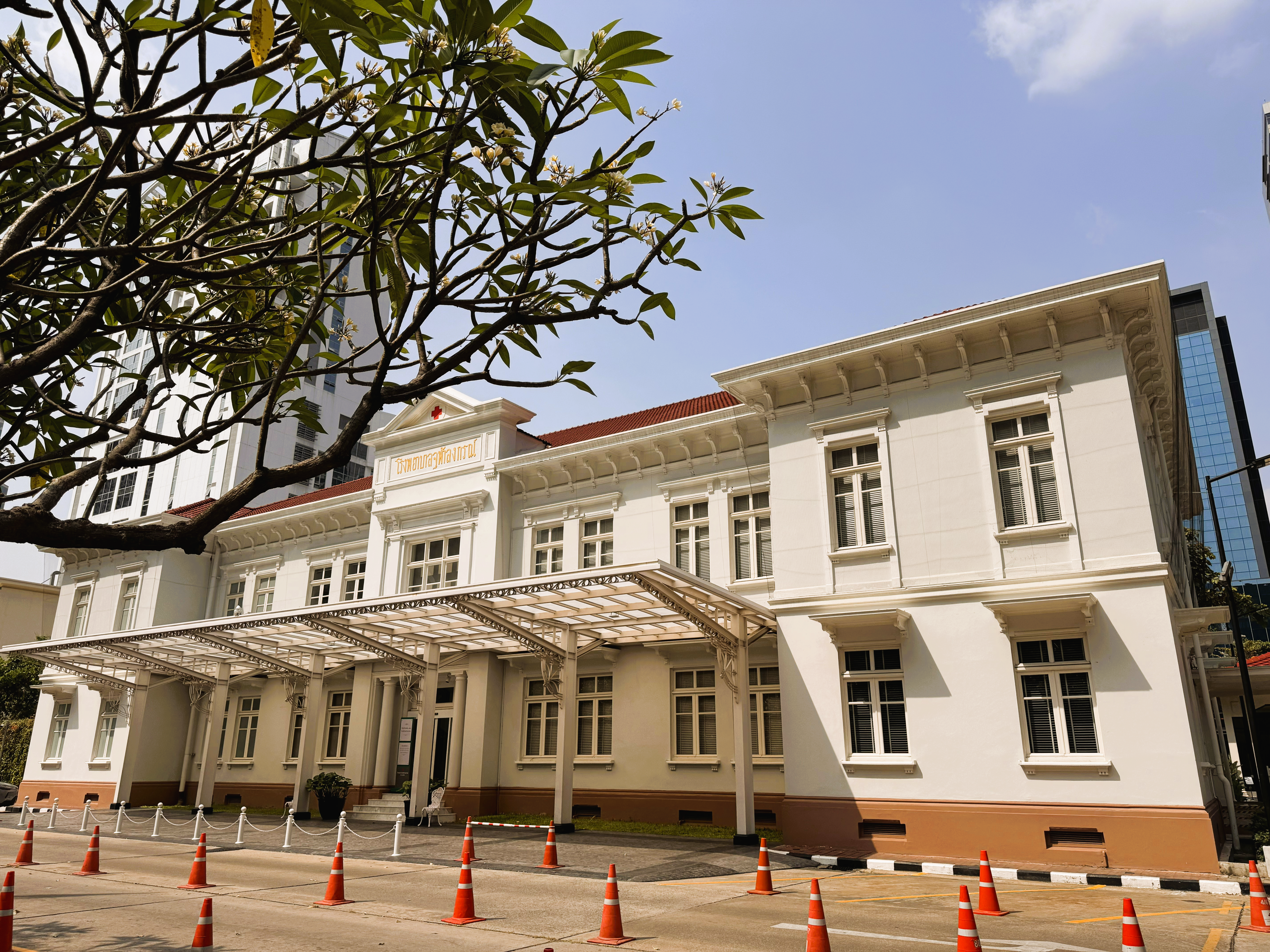
Old administration building.

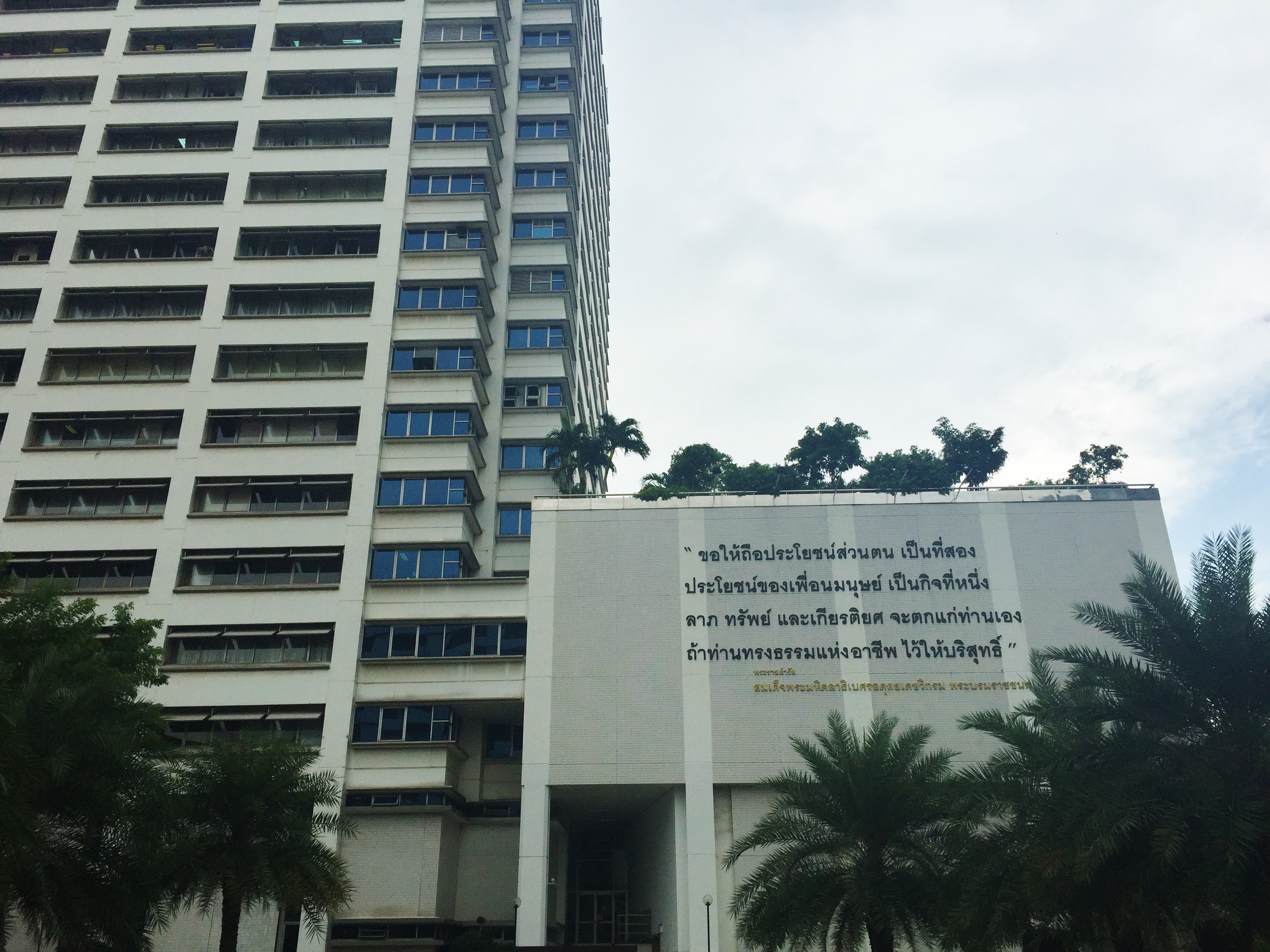
The faculty building, Or Por Ror building.

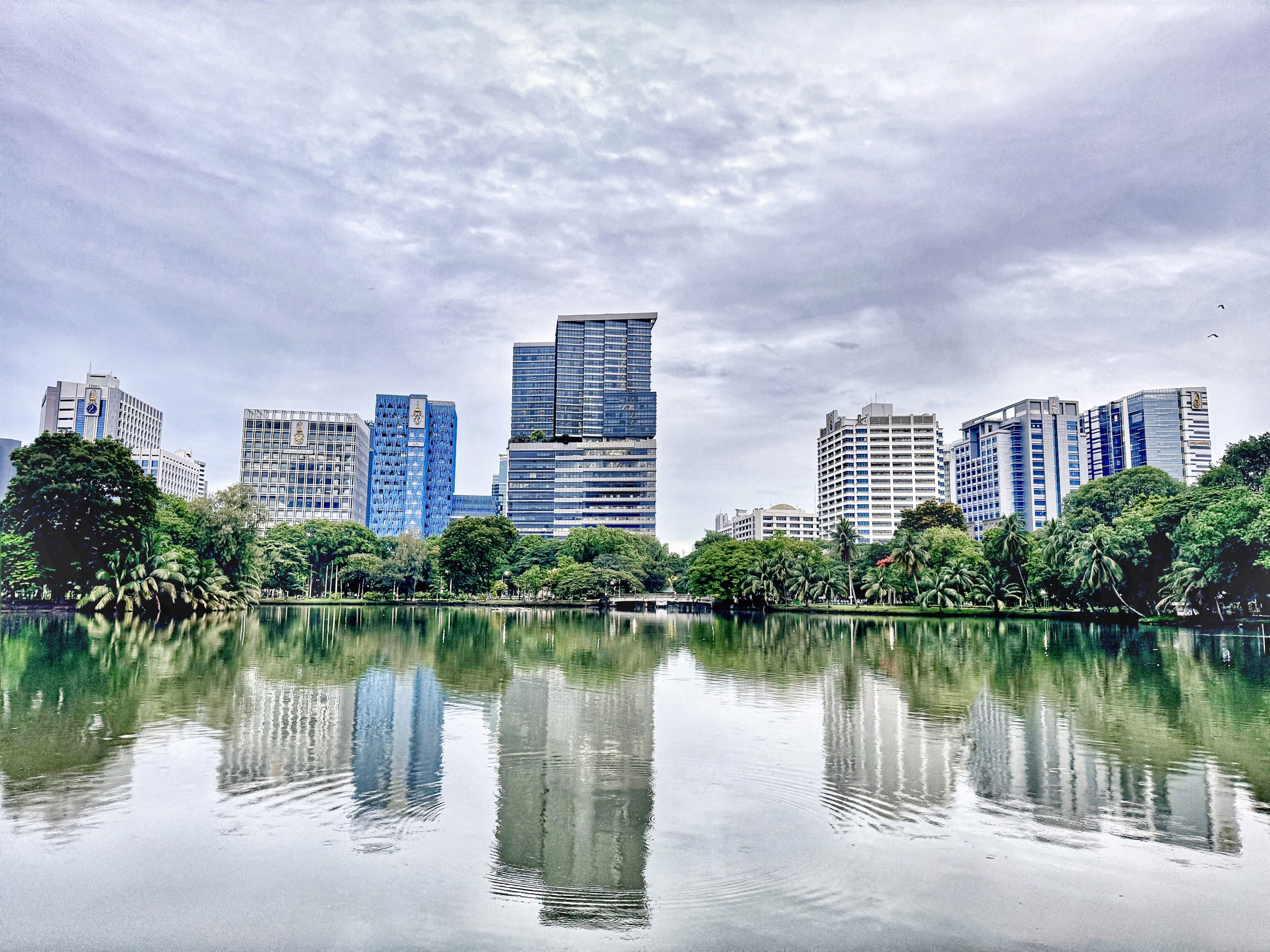
The building complex of King Chulalongkorn Memorial Hospital of the Thai Red Cross Society and the Faculty of Medicine, Chulalongkorn University, as seen from the central lake in Lumphini Park, with the water serving as a reflective surface.

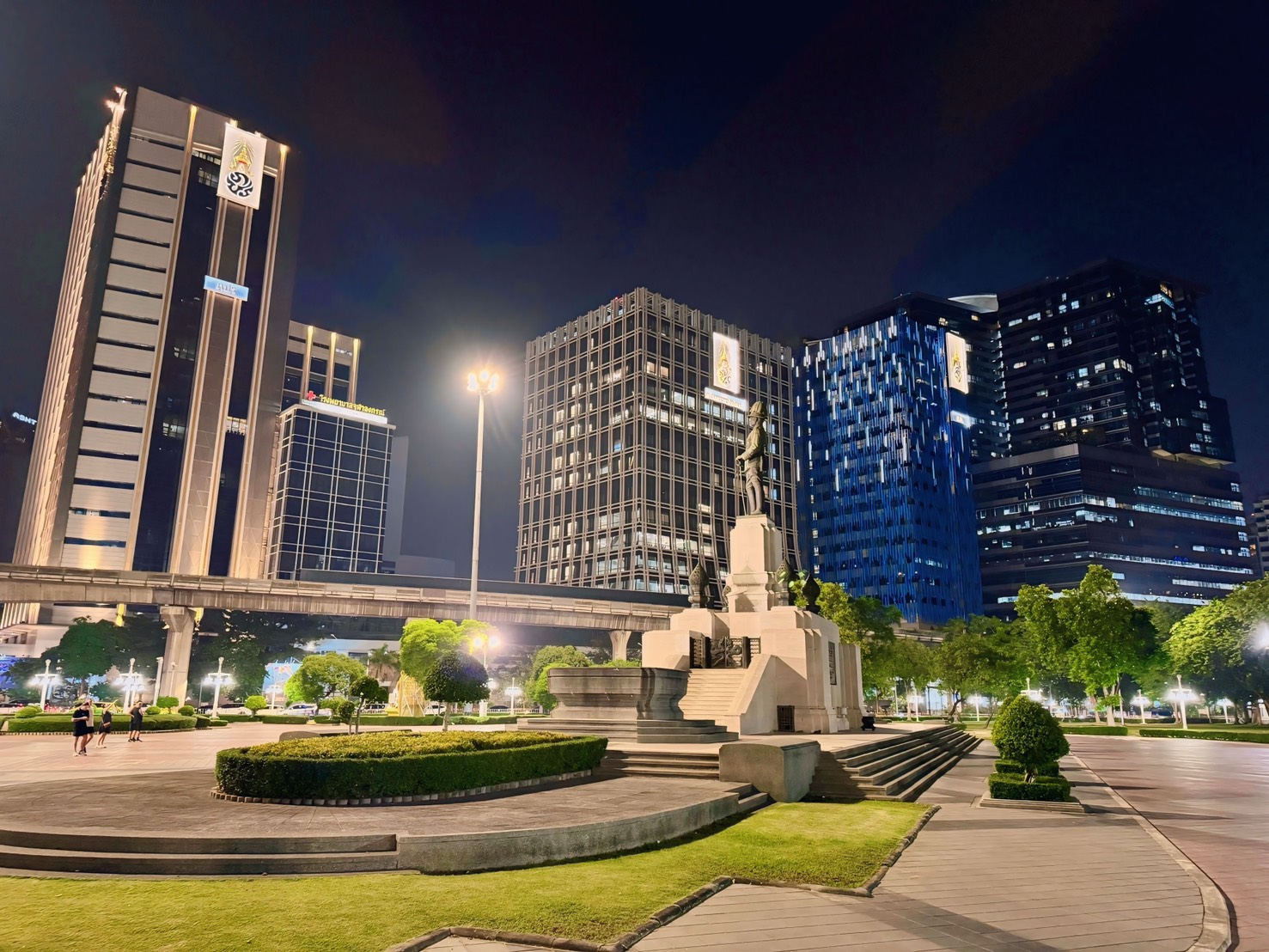
King Chulalongkorn Memorial Hospital has created a distinctive landmark on Bangkok’s skyline.

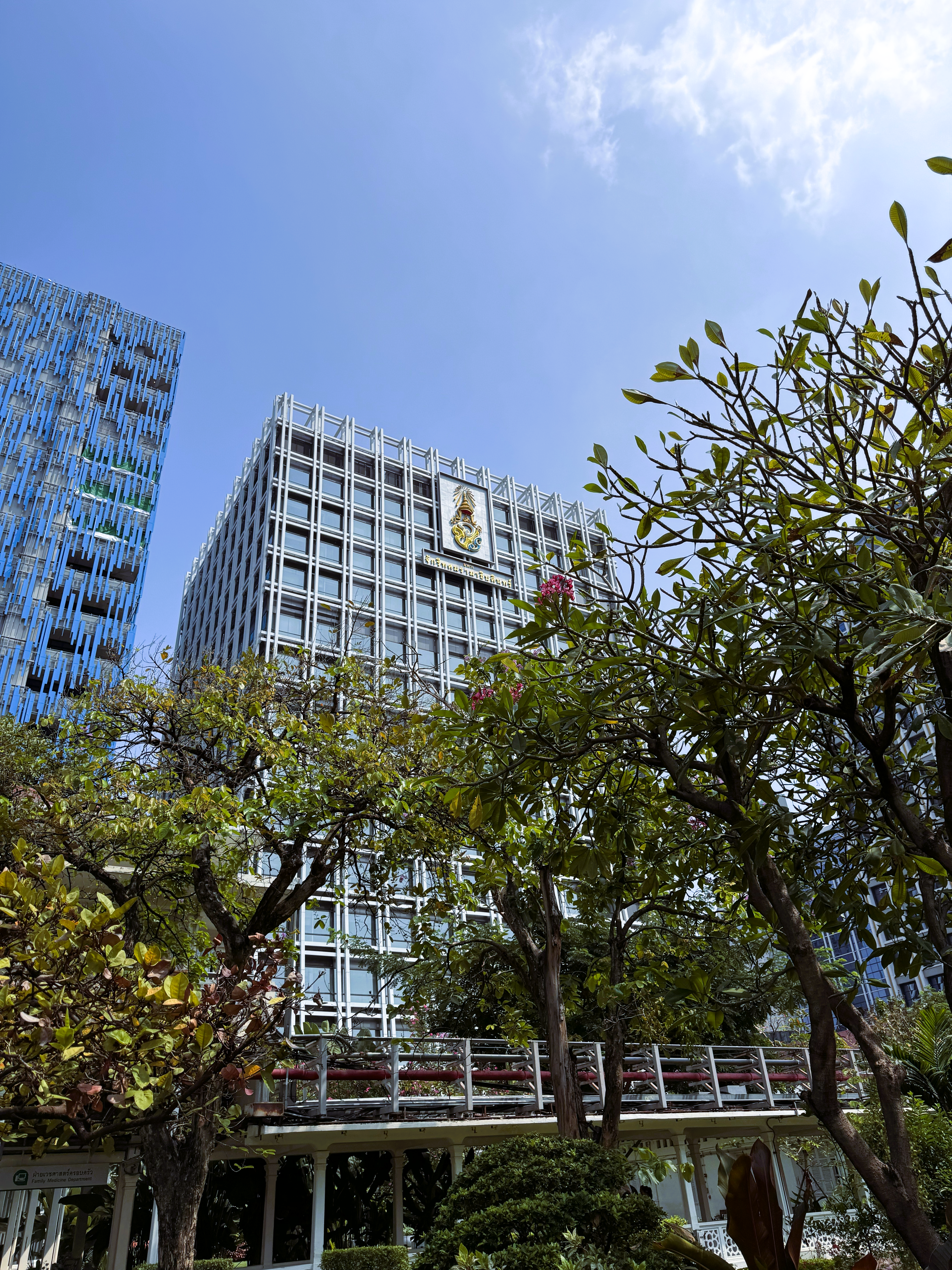
Green spaces within King Chulalongkorn Memorial Hospital and Chakri Thasamaramathibodindra Building.

== See also ==
- List of structures and infrastructure affected by the 2025 Myanmar earthquake
- Faculty of Medicine, Chulalongkorn University
- Hospitals in Thailand
- List of hospitals in Thailand
