= Prapokklao Hospital =

Prapokklao Hospital โรงพยาบาลพระปกเกล้า
- The Ministry of Public Health Health District 6

Geography
- Location: 38 Leab Noen Road, Wat Mai Subdistrict, Mueang Chanthaburi District, Chanthaburi 22000, Thailand
- Coordinates: 12.604293°N 102.102341°E

Organisation
- Type: Regional
- Affiliated university: Faculty of Medicine, Chulalongkorn University

Services
- Beds: 716

History
- Former name: Chanthaburi Hospital
- Opened: 24 June 1940

Links
- Website: www.ppkhosp.go.th
- Lists: Hospitals in Thailand

Prapokklao Hospital (Thai: โรงพยาบาลพระปกเกล้า), sometimes stylised as King Prajadhipok Memorial Hospital, is the main hospital of Chanthaburi Province, Thailand and is classified under the Ministry of Public Health as a regional hospital. It has a CPIRD Medical Education Center which trains doctors for the Faculty of Medicine of Chulalongkorn University.

== History ==
Construction of a hospital was started in 1937 by Luang Nirin Prasatwet, then the member of parliament for Chanthaburi Province. The first hospital building was completed in December 1939 with a capacity of 50 beds. The hospital opened as Chanthaburi Hospital on 24 June 1940. The hospital was used as a field hospital throughout the Franco-Thai War, and handled over 300 casualties from the Battle of Ko Chang. In 1954, a visit by Queen Rambai Barni initiated further expansion of the hospital through royal funds. In 1955, following the completion of new facilities, the hospital was renamed Prapokklao Hospital in memory of King Prajadhipok. A midwifery and nursing school (now the Prapokklao Nursing College) was opened at the hospital in 1966. In 1976, the hospital cooperated with the Faculty of Medicine, Chulalongkorn University to train doctors as part of the Collaborative Project to Increase Rural Doctor (CPIRD) Program.

== See also ==
- Healthcare in Thailand
- Hospitals in Thailand
- List of hospitals in Thailand
