= Phaya Thai Palace =

Former royal residence in Bangkok, Thailand

Coordinates: 13°46′6″N 100°31′58″E

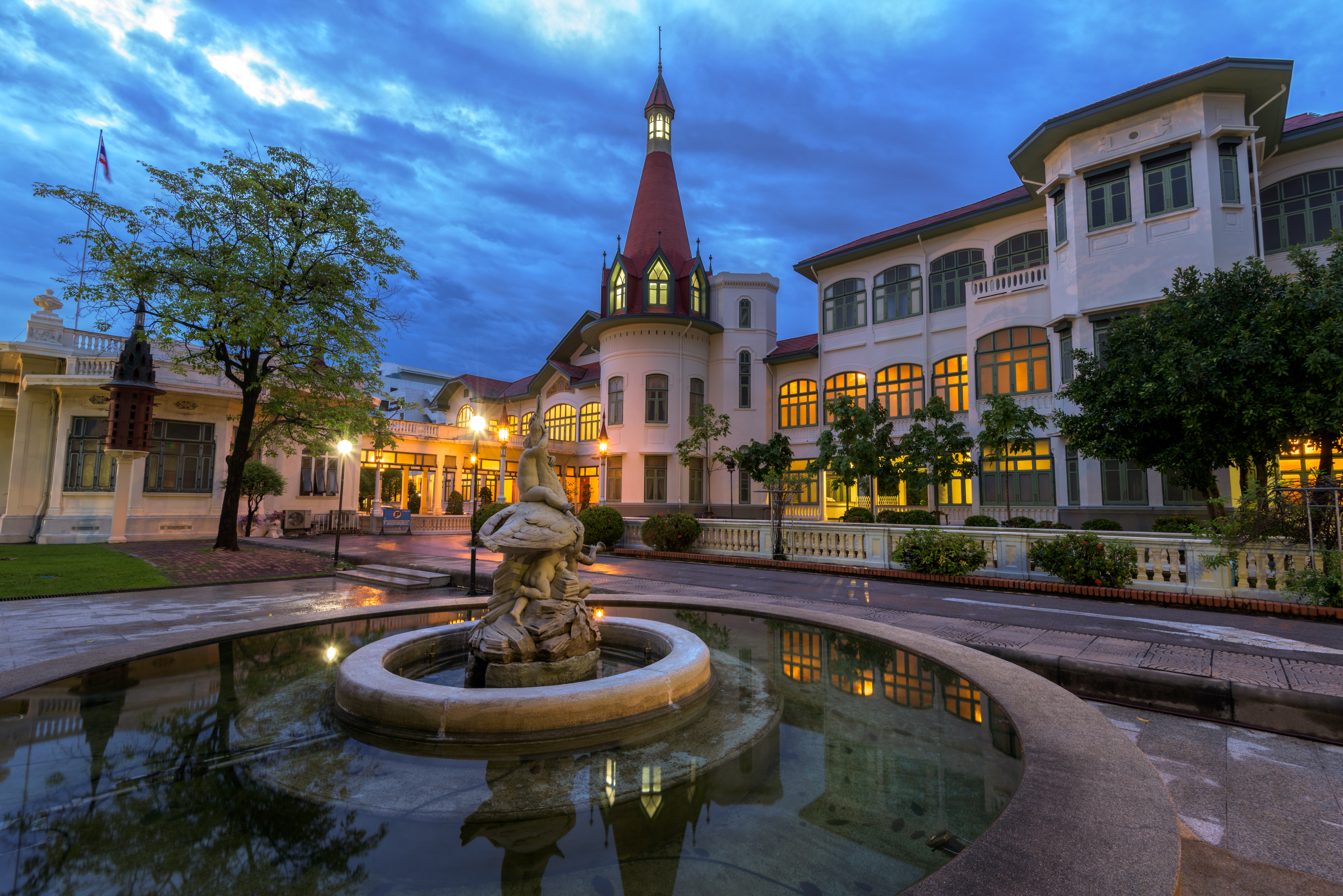
Phaya Thai Palace

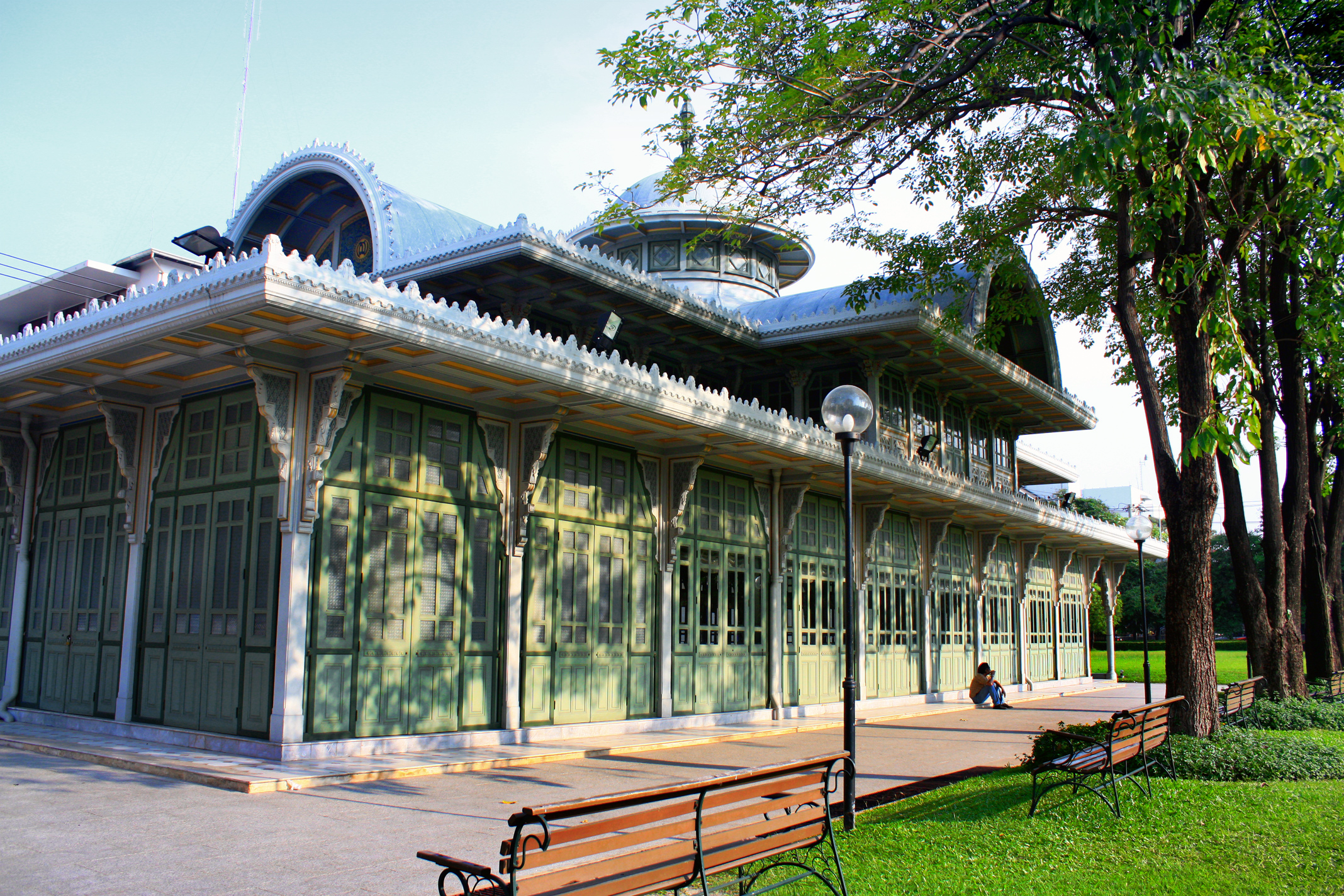
Thewarat Sapharom Hall

The Phya Thai Palace (Thai: วังพญาไท Wang Phaya Thai) or Royal Phya Thai Palace (พระราชวังพญาไท Phra Ratcha Wang Phaya Thai) is on the banks of the Samsen Canal (คลองสามเสน Khlong Sam Sen) on Rajavithee Road (ถนนราชวิถี Thanon Ratchawithi) in the Ratchathewi District of Bangkok. King Rama V bestowed on it the royal name of the Royal Residence of the Phya Thai (พระตำหนักพญาไท Phra Tamnak Phaya Thai) or the Phya Thai Palace, with Phya Thai (พญาไท Phaya Thai) meaning "lord of the Thais", during his reign and so it was built with this bearing on design.

== History ==
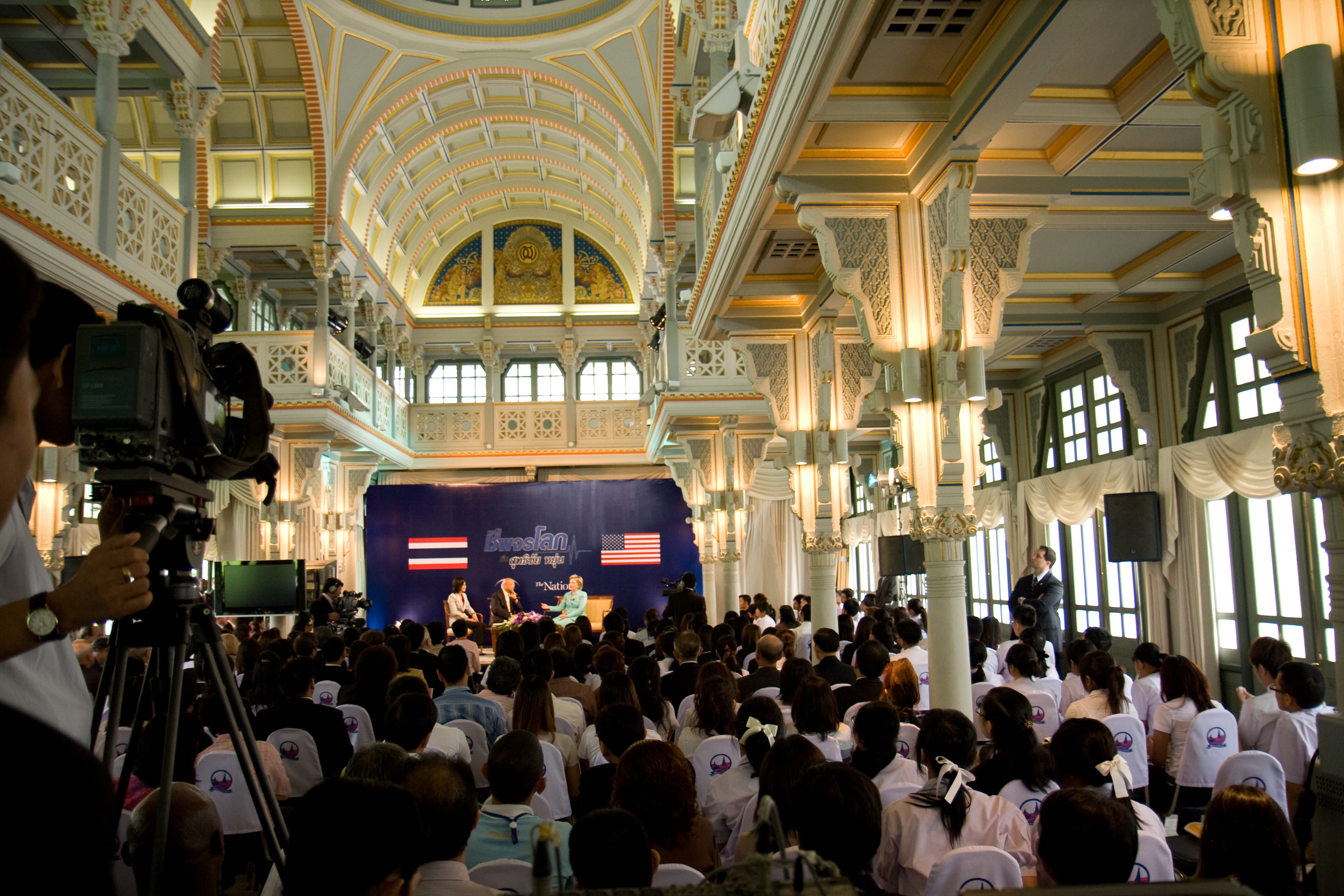
Inside of a throne hall in Phaya Thai Palace during Hillary Clinton’s visit in 2009

Construction of Phya Thai Palace began in 1909. It was built at Rama V's behest so that he might stay there and look out over the farms, plantations, and livestock in the area. The palace grounds included those areas directly opposite the palace. He also had a complex included in the compound where the Royal Ploughing Ceremony might take place, since used on many occasions.

The Phya Thai Palace was only used by King Rama V for a short time as he died several months after its completion.

During the reign of King Rama VI, Queen Saovabha, then Queen Mother, was invited to live there, which she did until her death in 1920. Rama VI then had the palace demolished, leaving only the Devaraja Sabharamaya Hall (พระที่นั่งเทวราชสภารมย์ Phra Thi Nang Thewarat Sapharom) and Throne Hall, and ordered that many new palace halls be built together to form a new Royal Phya Thai Palace.

King Rama VI lived at the palace until the later years of his reign, when he moved to stay at the Chakraput Piman Hall (พระที่นั่งจักรพรรดิพิมาน Phra Thi Nang Chakkraphat Phiman) of the Grand Palace until his death.

King Rama VII ordered the palace be converted into an international hotel, an enterprise which ended five years later. Phya Thai Palace then became the site of the first Thai radio broadcast station. Later, after a change of government the palace became a clinic for the Royal Thai Army and has since changed its name to the Phramongkutklao Hospital (โรงพยาบาลพระมงกุฎเกล้า Rong Phayaban Phra Mongkut Klao).

== Miscellaneous ==
The palace was featured in the famous The Amazing Race 14 as the 8th and last non-elimination pit-stop.
