= Boat noodles =

Thai noodle dish

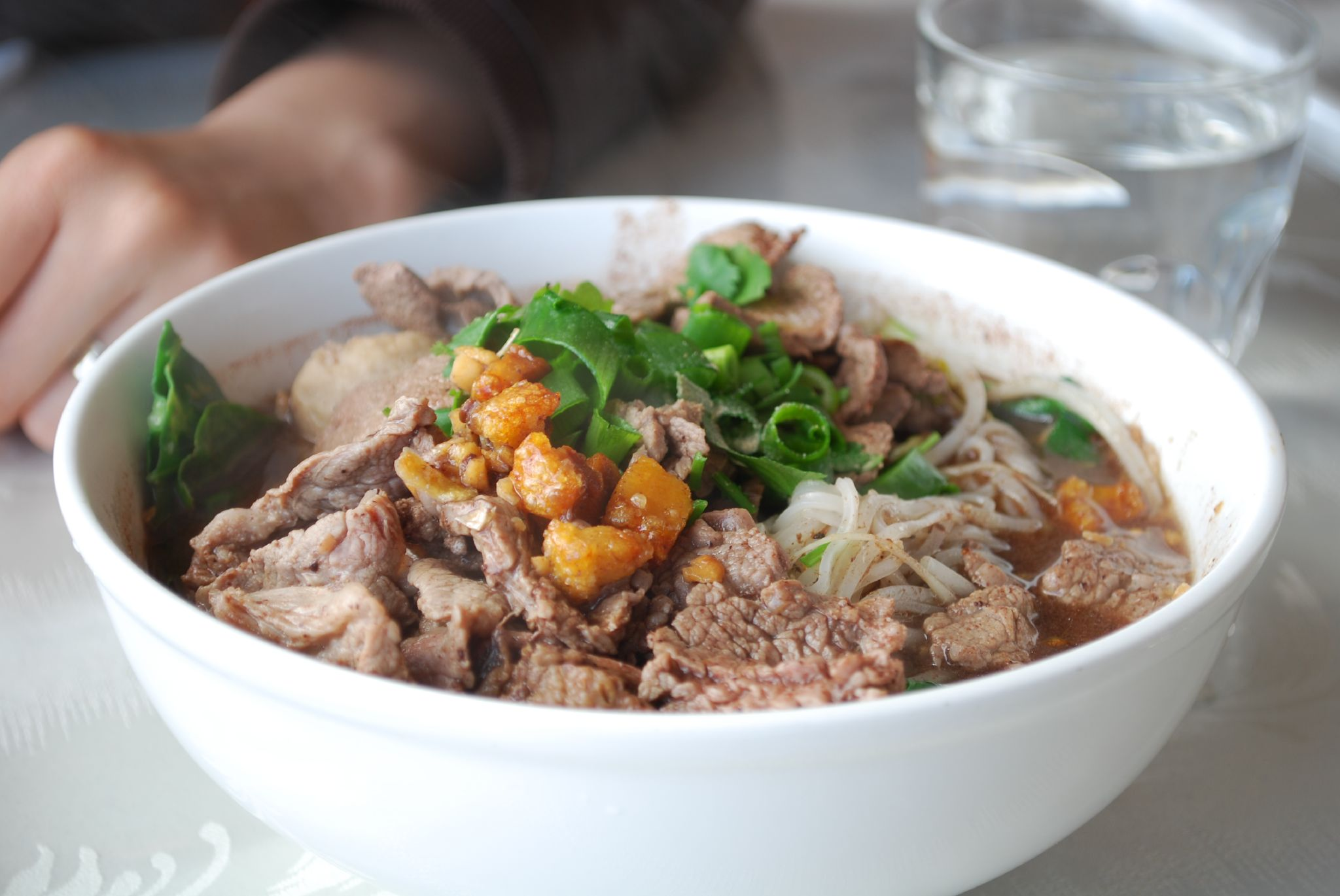
- Alternative names: Boat noodle soup, kuaitiao ruea
- Type: Noodle
- Place of origin: Thailand
- Region or state: Thailand
- Main ingredients: dark soy sauce, pickled bean curd, pig blood, salt, garlic, fried garlic, radish, cinnamon, bean sprouts, parsley, morning glory, paprika

Boat noodles (Thai: ก๋วยเตี๋ยวเรือ, RTGS: kuaitiao ruea, pronounced [kǔaj.tǐaw rɯ̄a]) is a Thai-style noodle dish with a strong flavor. It contains both pork and beef, as well as dark soy sauce, pickled bean curd, and some other spices, and it is normally served with meatballs and pig's liver. The soup is seasoned with pig or cow blood mixed with salt and spices (เลือดหมูสด (lueat mu sot) or เลือดเนื้อสด (lueat nuea sot)). The colour is similar to that of beef noodle soup (ก๋วยเตี๋ยวเนื้อ (kuaitiao nuea pueai)), but the soup is considerably thicker due to the added blood. It is commonly served in a small bowl.

The other ingredients of boat noodles are garlic, fried garlic, radish, cinnamon, bean sprouts, parsley, morning glory, and some Thai chili flakes. There are several types of noodles used for this dish: thin rice noodles, egg noodles, sen yai (เส้นใหญ่; 'big noodles'), and sen lek (เส้นเล็ก; 'small noodles').

Boat noodles are commonly served with pork cracklings and basil or holy basil.

== History ==
Boat noodles were originally served from boats that traversed Bangkok's canals.

In the past, a boat noodle merchant would have been the only person working and doing everything by himself, from paddling the boat to scalding the noodles, seasoning the soup, serving the dish, handling money, and washing the bowls. If the bowl was too big, it would be difficult to hand it over to the customer on land since it might be easily spilled. This is the reason why a boat noodle bowl is small, for the convenience and safety of the merchant.

Nowadays the dish is also served in restaurants, but the dish's historical identity is maintained by it still being served in a small bowl and often with a boat moored in front of the place.

Notable boat noodle areas in Thailand are Ayutthaya and Rangsit in the central region, but presently the most notable is the Victory Monument neighborhood.

== See also ==
- Cuisine of Thailand
- List of noodle dishes
- List of Thai dishes
