= Chonburi Hospital =

Hospital in Chonburi, Thailand

Chonburi Hospital โรงพยาบาลชลบุรี
- Ministry of Public Health District 6

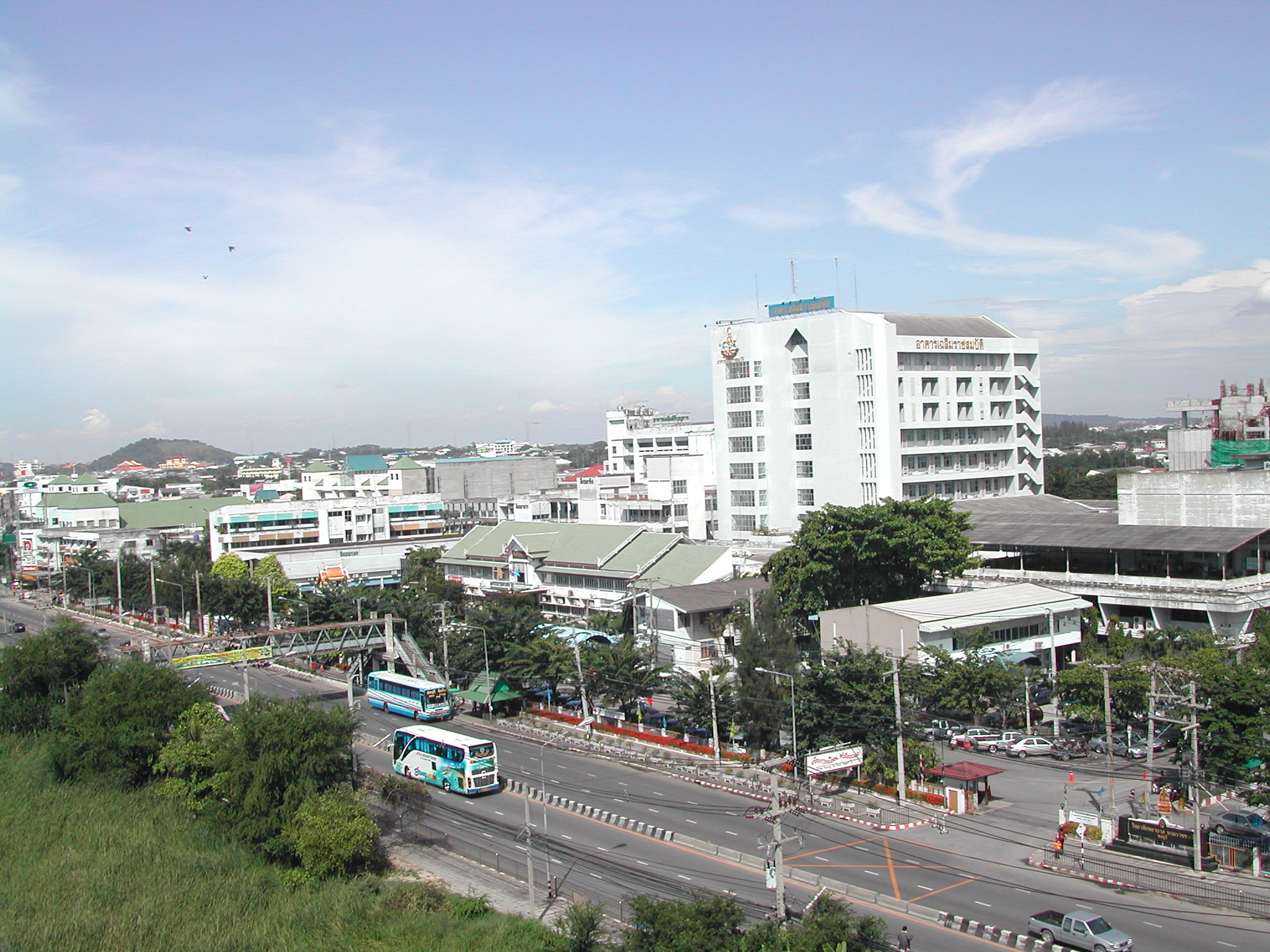

Geography
- Location: 69 Sukhumvit Road, Ban Suan Subdistrict, Mueang Chonburi District, Chonburi 20000, Thailand
- Coordinates: 13.351691°N 100.982425°E

Organisation
- Type: Regional
- Affiliated university: Faculty of Medicine, Chulalongkorn University; Phramongkutklao College of Medicine

Services
- Beds: 824

History
- Opened: 18 November 1948

Links
- Website: www.cbh.moph.go.th/cbhweb2/index.php
- Lists: Hospitals in Thailand

Chonburi Hospital (Thai: โรงพยาบาลชลบุรี) is the main hospital of Chonburi Province, Thailand and is classified under the Ministry of Public Health as a regional hospital. It has a CPIRD Medical Education Center which trains doctors for the Faculty of Medicine of Chulalongkorn University. It is an affiliated teaching hospital of Phramongkutklao College of Medicine.

== History ==
Chonburi Hospital was first constructed in 1919 as decided upon by the provincial governor and the local health authorities. The hospital initially had only one wooden building located 800 metres (2,600 ft) away from the coast and was named "Chonburi Provincial Hospital", managed by the local sukhaphiban. By 1935, as the management changed to the local thesaban system, the hospital had two patients buildings, three special care rooms and one operating theatre.

In 1940, plans were initiated to move the hospital to its present-day location next to Sukhumvit Road due to regular flooding which damaged the buildings. Construction was completed in 1948 and the hospital was officially opened on 18 November, with management transferred to the MOPH.

== See also ==
- Healthcare in Thailand
- Hospitals in Thailand
- List of hospitals in Thailand
