= Faculty of Medicine, Chulalongkorn University =

Medical School in Thailand

- คณะแพทยศาสตร์ จุฬาลงกรณ์มหาวิทยาลัย
- Former names: Faculty of Medicine Chulalongkorn Hospital, University of Medical Sciences
- Established: June 4, 1947
- Parent institution: Chulalongkorn University
- Dean: Assoc. Prof. Chanchai Sittipunt, MD
- Undergraduates: 1868
- Postgraduates: 920
- Doctoral students: 93
- Location: Pathum Wan, Bangkok, Thailand; 13.733495°N 100.536392°E
- Campus: Urban, The Thai Red Cross Society Land
- Colours: Forest green
- Website: www.md.chula.ac.th

The Faculty of Medicine, Chulalongkorn University (Thai: คณะแพทยศาสตร์ จุฬาลงกรณ์มหาวิทยาลัย), the second oldest medical school in Thailand, was established in 1947 in accordance with the wishes of King Ananda Mahidol to educate a sufficient number of medical doctors to satisfy the public's demands. For more than half a century, this medical school has provided society with more than 5,000 medical doctors. The school accepts about 300 medical students and more than 100 for postgraduate residency training each year. It has consistently been ranked as one of the best medical schools in Thailand and, as of 2024, is the most competitive in terms of admissions scores.

== History ==
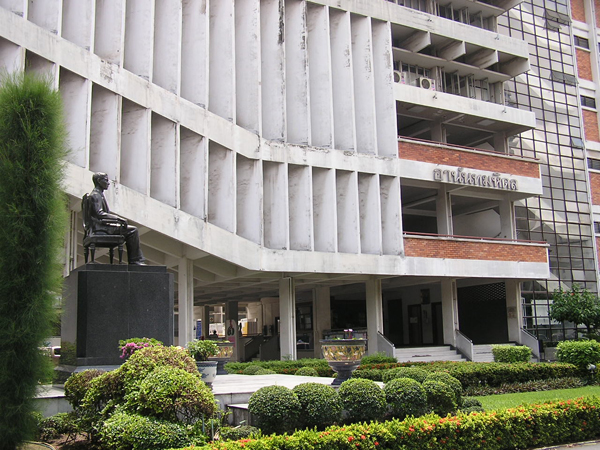
King Ananda Mahidol Statue in front of Ananda Mahidol Building

The Faculty of Medicine Chulalongkorn University is the second oldest medical school in Thailand and has been founded in keeping with the wishes of King Ananda Mahidol to see the University of Medical Sciences (now Mahidol University) produce more doctors so as to provide better health care for his people and satisfy the public's demands. Acting on H.M. the King's wish, the Royal Thai Government allocated a sum of money to the University of Medical Sciences for expanding medical education. The school was then established in King Chulalongkorn Memorial Hospital, the Thai Red Cross Society. In pursuance of a royal decree, the Faculty of Medicine King Chulalongkorn Memorial Hospital was established on June 4, 1947 and was officially opened on June 11, 1947.

On October 1, 1967 the school was transferred from University of Medical Sciences to Chulalongkorn University, the oldest university in Thailand, and renamed as the Faculty of Medicine, Chulalongkorn University.

Because of need to produce more rural medical doctors has been emphasized, the school initiated the Medical Education for Students in Rural Area Project (MESRAP) in 1978. Ministry of Public Health approved Chonburi Hospital & Prapokklao Hospital as teaching affiliates in this project, a new model of medical education in rural area, which was subsequently changed to the Collaborative Project to Increase Production of Rural Doctor (CPIRD).

For more than half a century, this medical school has provided society with more than 5,000 medical doctors who are not only highly qualified and well-trained, but also ethical and moral. In addition, it strongly advocates research in a wide variety of fields, promotes advancements in medical science and public health, and serves as a knowledge base for academics in Thailand and abroad.

== Education ==
As of the 2018 intake, a total of 313 undergraduate medical students are accepted into the course at the Faculty of Medicine. The faculty introduced a graduate medicine international program in 2020, requiring applicants to have completed the MCAT.

== Publications ==
The present work provides on update on the publications of Thailand and Thai institutions in ISI Web of Science databases for the period 1999–2005. Comparison between the faculties of Medicine, Shows that in 2005, Chulalongkorn University produced the most publications at 156 papers, followed by the Faculty of Medicine Siriraj Hospital with 101 papers and the Faculty of Medicine Ramathibodi Hospital with 70 papers. The Faculty of Medicine, Chulalongkorn University has increased the international publications by 2.5 fold.

== Main Teaching Hospital ==
- King Chulalongkorn Memorial Hospital, the Thai Red Cross Society, Bangkok (Thai Program)
- Queen Savang Vadhana Memorial Hospital, the Thai Red Cross Society, Chonburi Province (CU–MEDi International Program)

== Affiliated Teaching Hospitals ==
- Bhumibol Adulyadej Hospital, Royal Thai Air Force, Bangkok
- Chonburi Hospital, Chonburi Province
- Prapokklao Hospital, Chanthaburi Province

== See also ==
- List of medical schools in Thailand
