= Phra Nakhon Si Ayutthaya province =

Province of Thailand

Coordinates: 14°20′58″N 100°33′34″E

Phra Nakhon Si Ayutthaya พระนครศรีอยุธยา
- Province

Other transcription(s)
  - Chinese: 大城 dua7 sian5 (Teochew Peng'im); Tōa-siâ (Hokkien POJ)
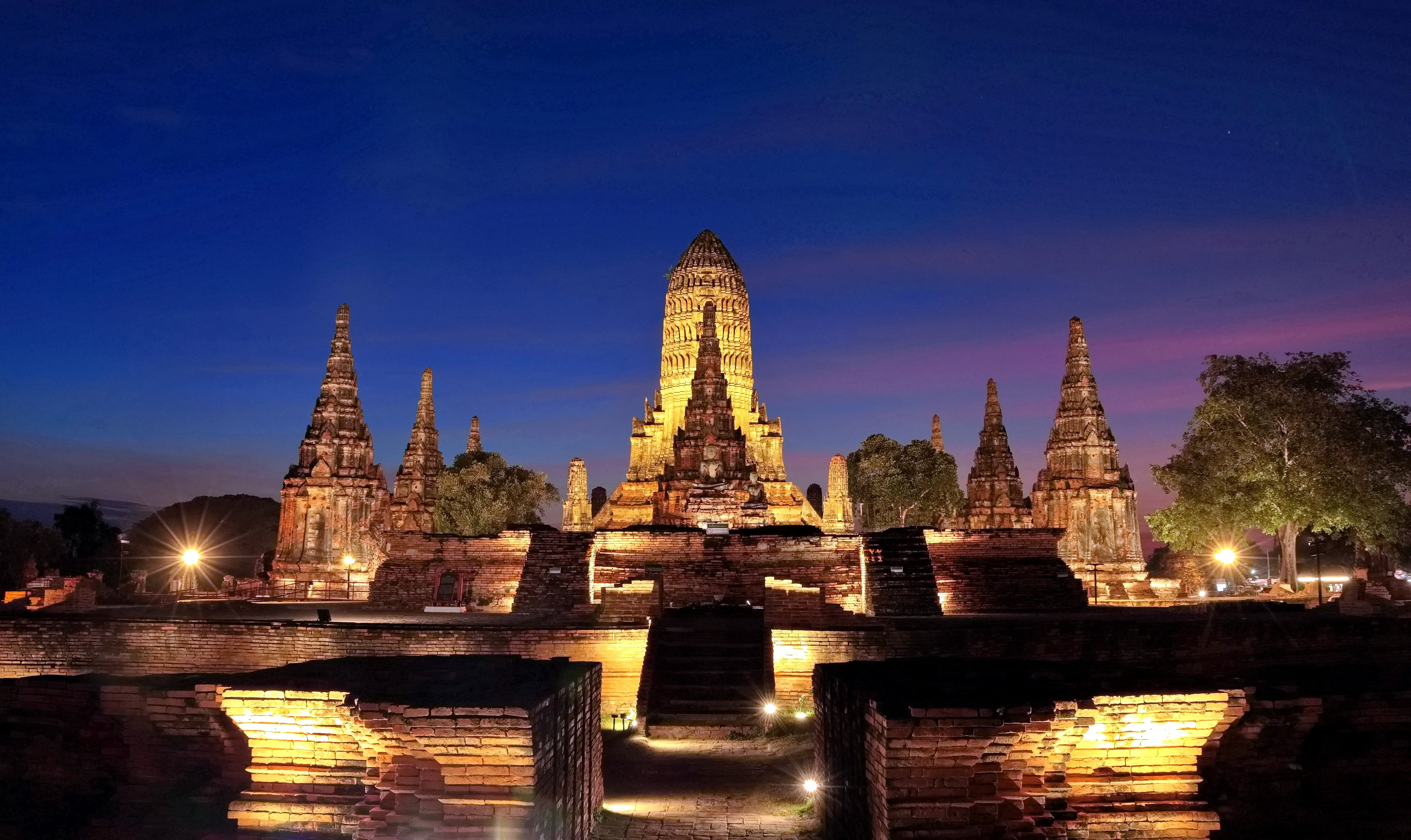
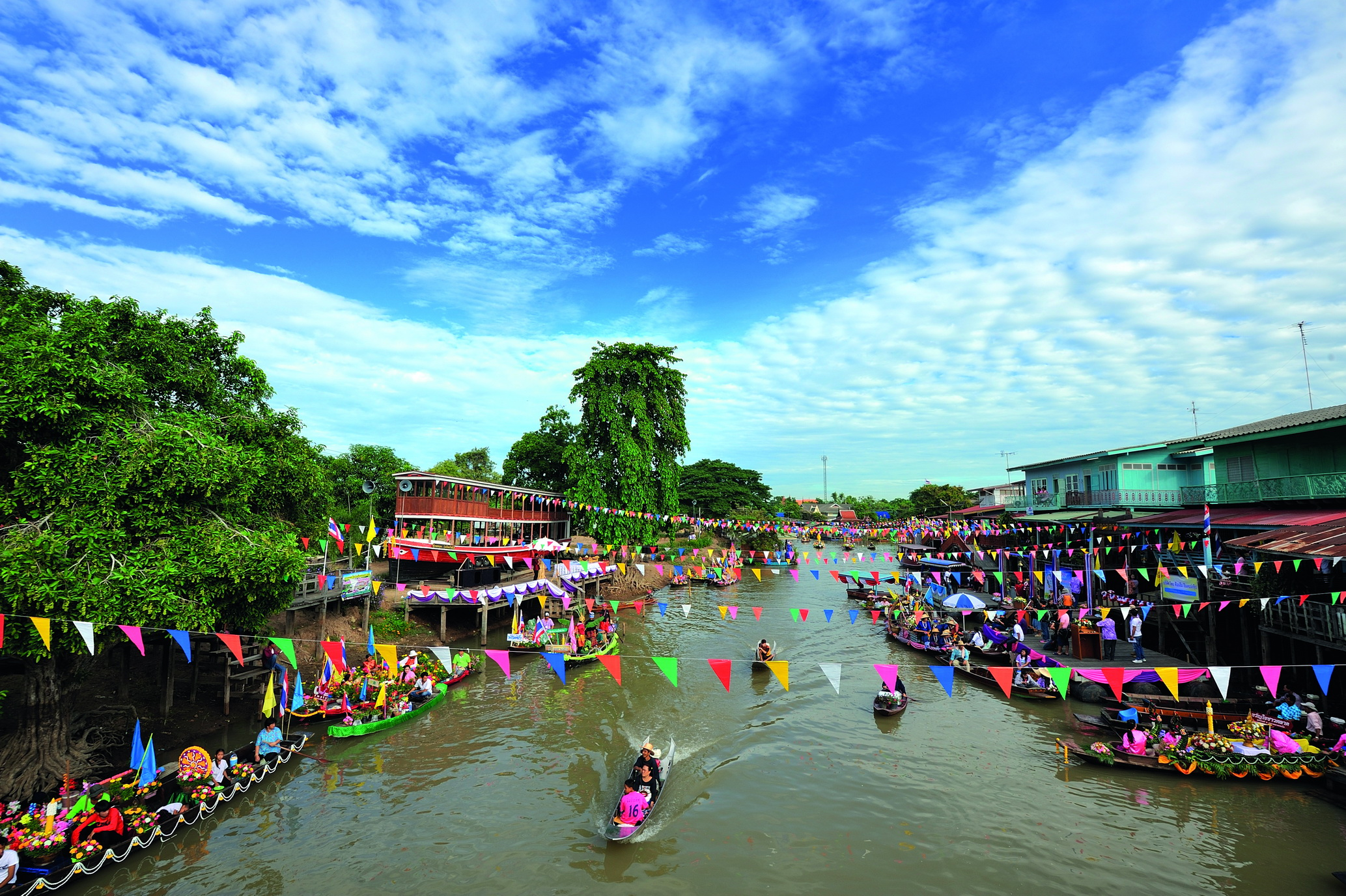
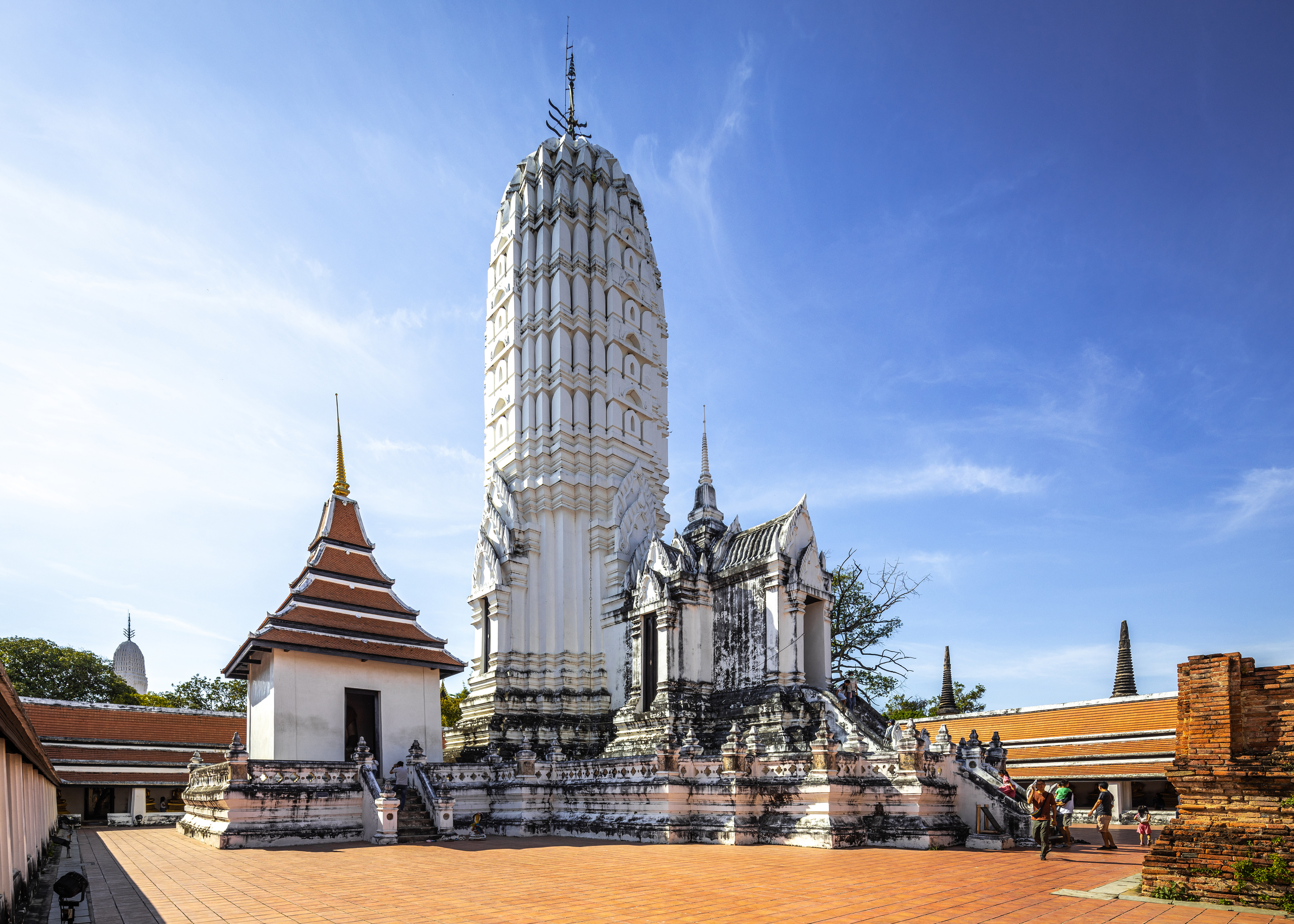
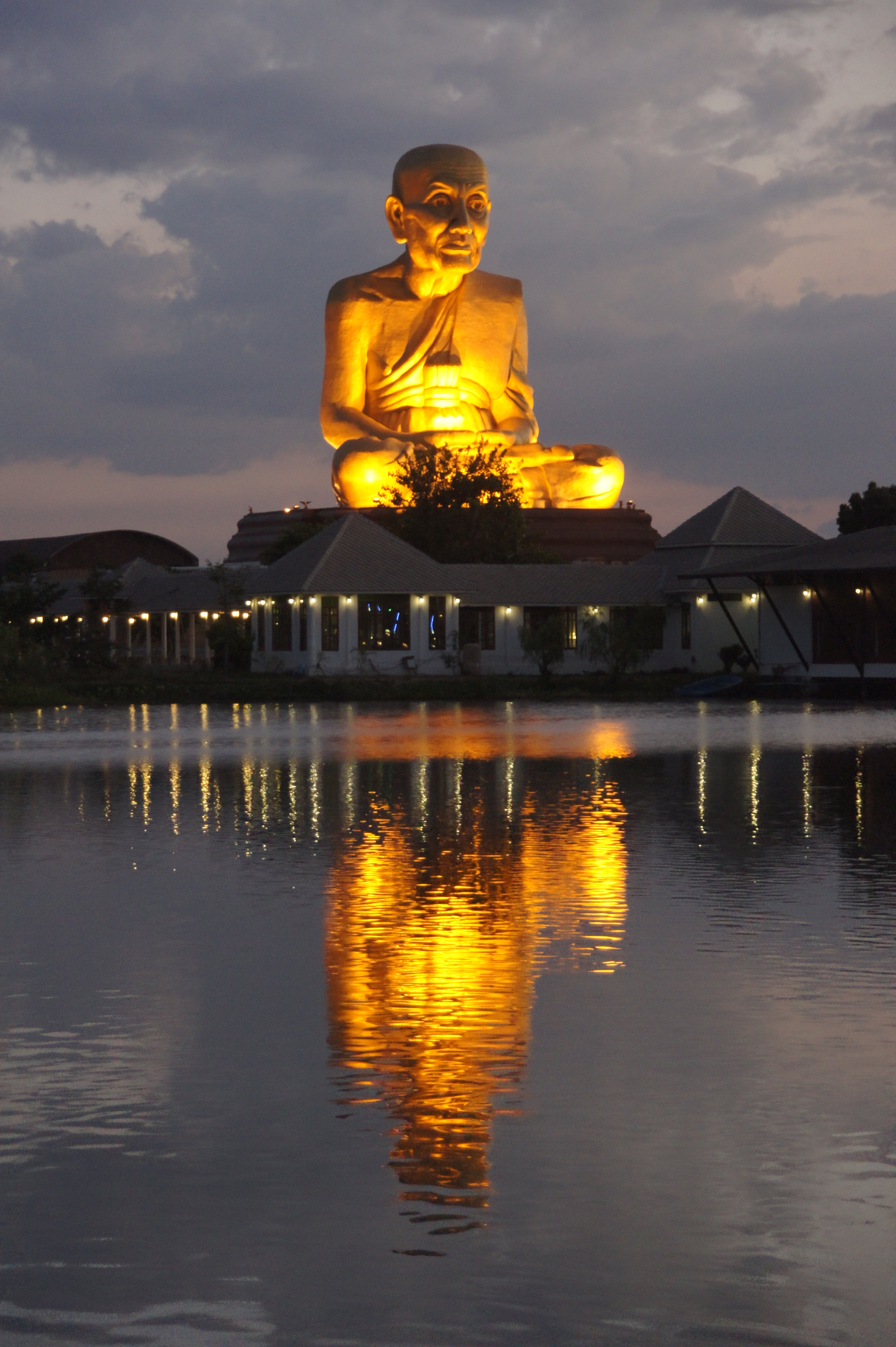
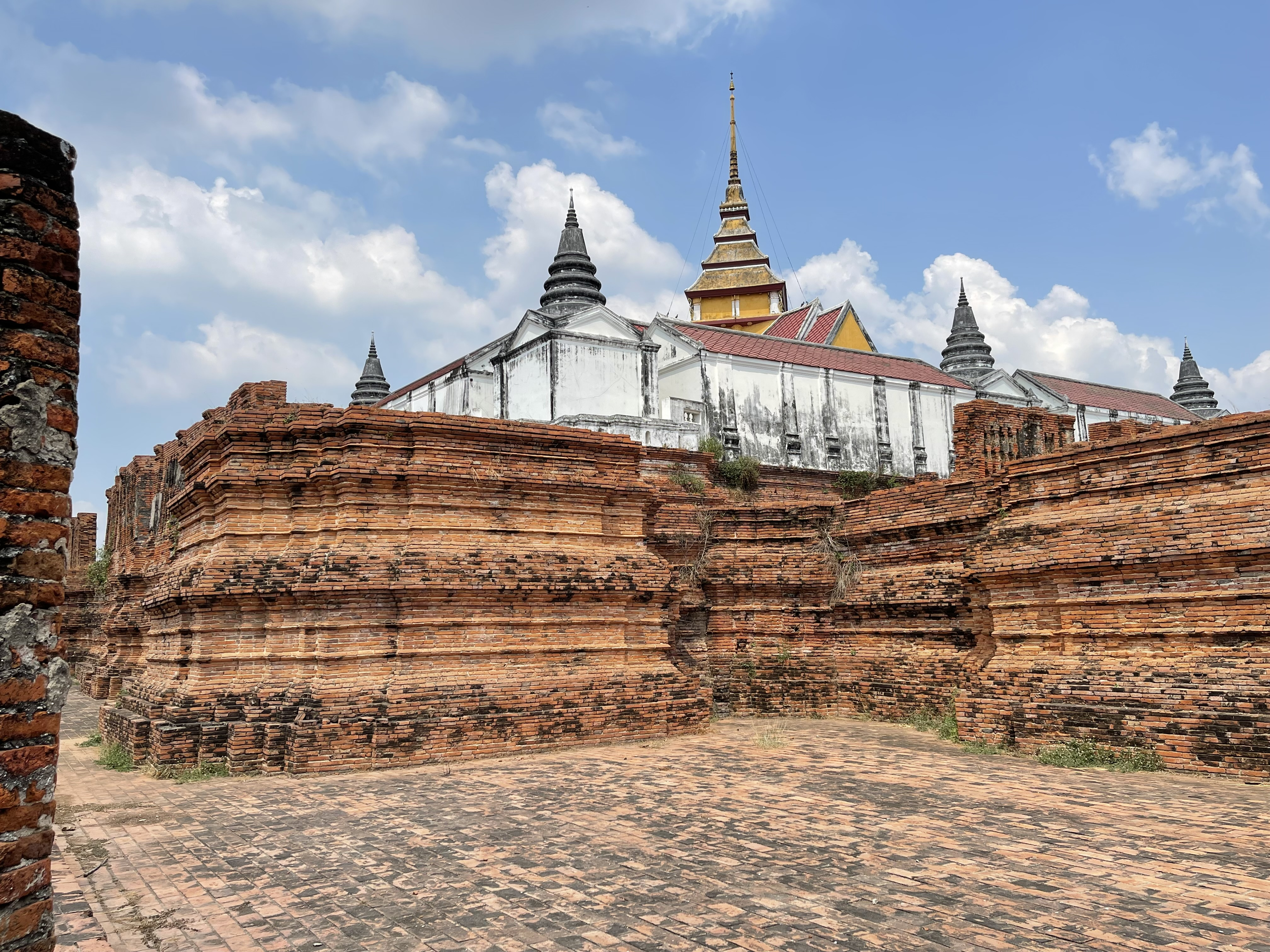
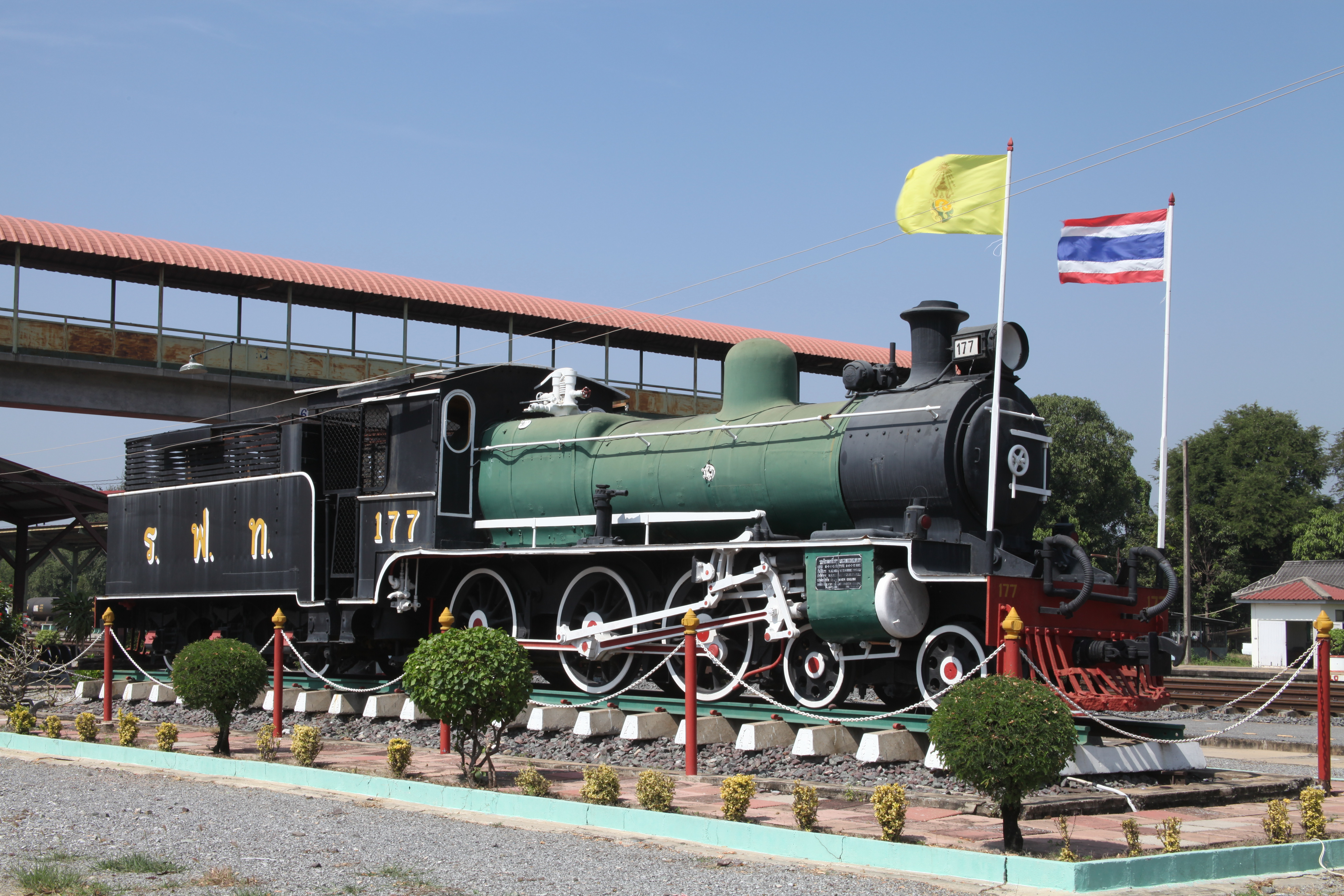
- From left to right, top to bottom: Wat Chaiwatthanaram at night; Ladchado market in Phak Hai district; Wat Phutthaisawan; Luang Pu Thuat statue at Maharat Buddhist Park, Maha Rat district; Prasat Nakhon Luang, Nakhon Luang district; Old steam locomotive at Ban Phachi Junction

- Flag Seal
- Nicknames: Krung Kao (Thai: กรุงเก่า) (The old capital); Ayutthaya
- Mottoes: ราชธานีเก่า อู่ข้าวอู่น้ำ เลิศล้ำกานท์กวี คนดีศรีอยุธยา เลอคุณค่ามรดกโลก ("The old capital. A land flowing with milk and honey. Excellent literature. The good people of Ayutthaya. The treasured world heritage.")
- Map of Thailand highlighting Phra Nakhon Si Ayutthaya province
- Country: Thailand
- Capital: Ayutthaya

Government
  - Governor: Niwat Rungsakorn

Area
  - Total: 2,548 km^{2} (984 sq mi)
  - Rank: 64th

Population (2024)
  - Total: ▲822,720
  - Rank: 30th
  - Density: 323/km^{2} (840/sq mi)
  - Rank: 11th

Human Achievement Index
  - HAI (2022): 0.6770 "high" Ranked 3rd

GDP
  - Total: baht 404 billion (US$13.3 billion) (2019)
- Time zone: UTC+7 (ICT)
- Postal code: 13xxx
- Calling code: 035
- ISO 3166 code: TH-14
- Website: ayutthaya.go.th

Phra Nakhon Si Ayutthaya Provincial Administrative Organization องค์การบริหารส่วนจังหวัดพระนครศรีอยุธยา
- Provincial Administrative Organization
- Interactive map of Phra Nakhon Si Ayutthaya Provincial Administrative Organization

Government
  - Type: Local administrative divisions
  - Body: Phra Nakhon Si Ayutthaya Provincial Administrative Organization
  - President: Somsong Phancharoenworakul
- Website: aypao.go.th

Phra Nakhon Si Ayutthaya, (Note: Thai: พระนครศรีอยุธยา, pronounced [pʰráʔ ná.kʰɔ̄ːn sǐː ʔā.jút.tʰā.jāː]) or locally and simply Ayutthaya (historically Iudea, Iudiad, Iudia, Juthia or Judia), is one of the central provinces (changwat) of Thailand. Neighboring provinces are (from north clockwise) Ang Thong, Lopburi, Saraburi, Pathum Thani, Nonthaburi, Nakhon Pathom and Suphan Buri.

== Toponymy ==
The name Ayutthaya derives from the Sanskrit word Ayodhyā, found in the Ramayana, which means "the invincible [city]". Grammatically, this word is composed of the morphemes a- 'not' + yodhya 'defeatable' (from the root yudh- 'to fight') + ā, a feminine suffix.

== Geography ==
Phra Nakhon Si Ayutthaya, covering 2,548 square kilometres (984 sq mi), is on the flat river plain of the Chao Phraya River valley. The presence of the Lopburi and Pa Sak rivers makes the province a major rice farming area. The total forest area is 0.05 km^{2} (0.019 sq mi) or 0.02 per mille of provincial area.

== History ==
Historical affiliations

Khmer Empire 802–1052
Kingdom of Suphanburi 1052–1351
Kingdom of Ayutthaya 1351–1370
Kingdom of Suphanburi 1370–1388
Kingdom of Ayutthaya 1388–1767
Kingdom of Thonburi 1767–1782
Kingdom of Siam 1782–1932
Kingdom of Thailand 1932–present

Ayutthaya was founded in 1350^{[a]} by King U-Thong. However, the establishment of Ayutthaya is far older than 14th century. Evidence shown that the area was already populated during Mon Dvaravati period. Sources further mentioned that around 850 AD, the Khmers occupied the area and established a stronghold there, named it as Ayodhya after one of the holiest Hindu cities of India of the same name. Consistently, Prince Damrong also agreed that there was a city called Ayodhya which was found by the Khmers ruling from Lopburi at the point where the three rivers meet. Excavation map shows the traces from an ancient baray (water reservoir) close to the southwestern tip of Wat Yai Chai Mongkhon which could has been built on a former important Khmer temple complex.

Ayutthaya was the capital of Thailand (then called Siam) for 417 years from 1350, until in Burmese–Siamese War (1765–1767), it was sacked by the Burmese army in 1767. During this era, now usually referred as the Ayutthaya period or Ayutthaya kingdom, Ayutthaya was ruled by 33 kings of five different dynasties. The kingdom became a major regional player, and a trade center of the East, a meeting point of European merchants and Asian traders. Notable monarchs during the Ayutthaya period include King Naresuan the Great, who liberated Ayutthaya from the first Burmese occupation and embarked on a reign of conquest, and King Narai the Great, who initiated diplomatic relations with France, during the reign of Louis XIV. His reign was the golden age of trade and culture.

The city was strategically positioned. During several months of the year, the flood plains around the cities would be flooded by the many rivers around the city. Enemy sieges were thus impossible, and forced to withdraw. This advantage was a contributing factor in the many failed Burmese invasions.

The ruins of the old capital in the Ayutthaya historical park have been a UNESCO World Heritage Site since December 1991. The province is also home to the Bang Pa-in summer palace complex.

Originally named Krung Kao (กรุงเก่า), the province was renamed Phra Nakhon Si Ayutthaya in 1926.

Gallery

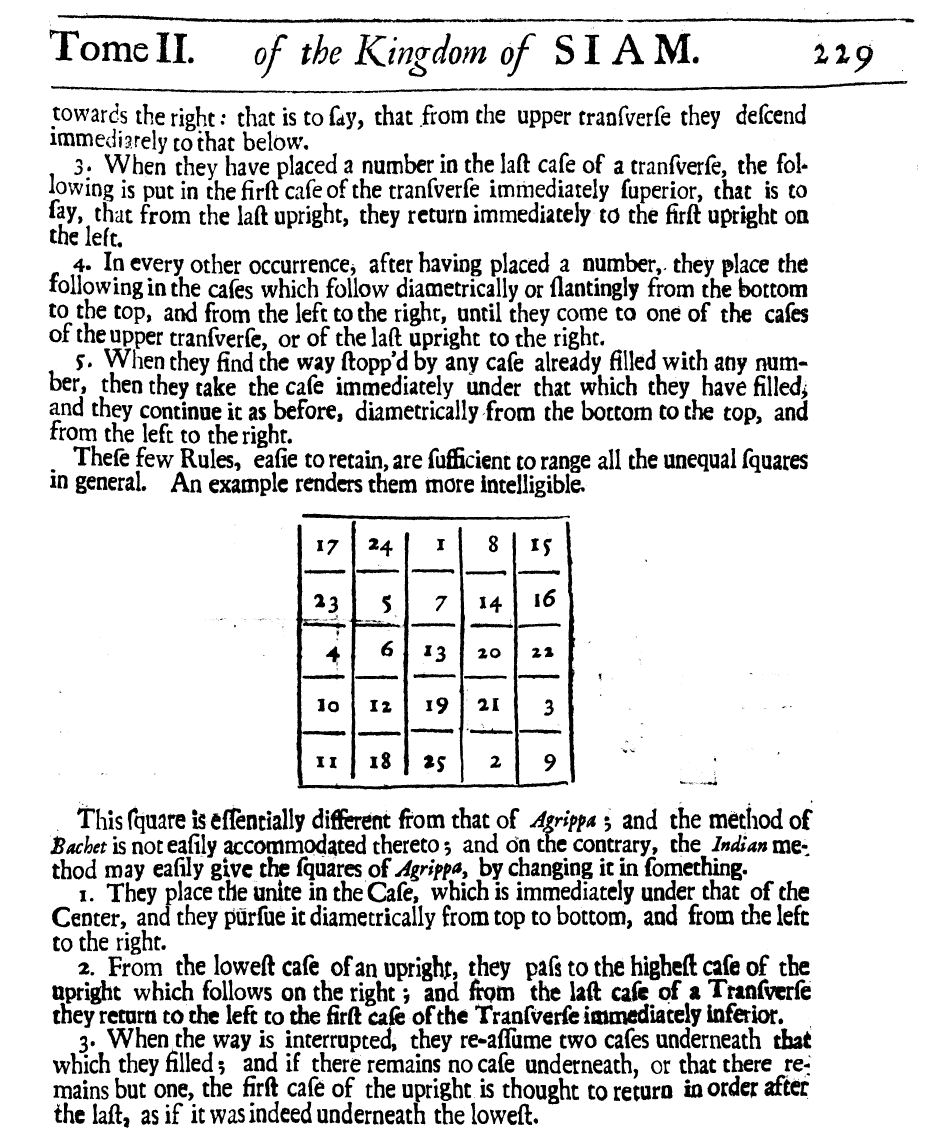
Siamese method for creating magic squares, Simon de la Loubère's 1693

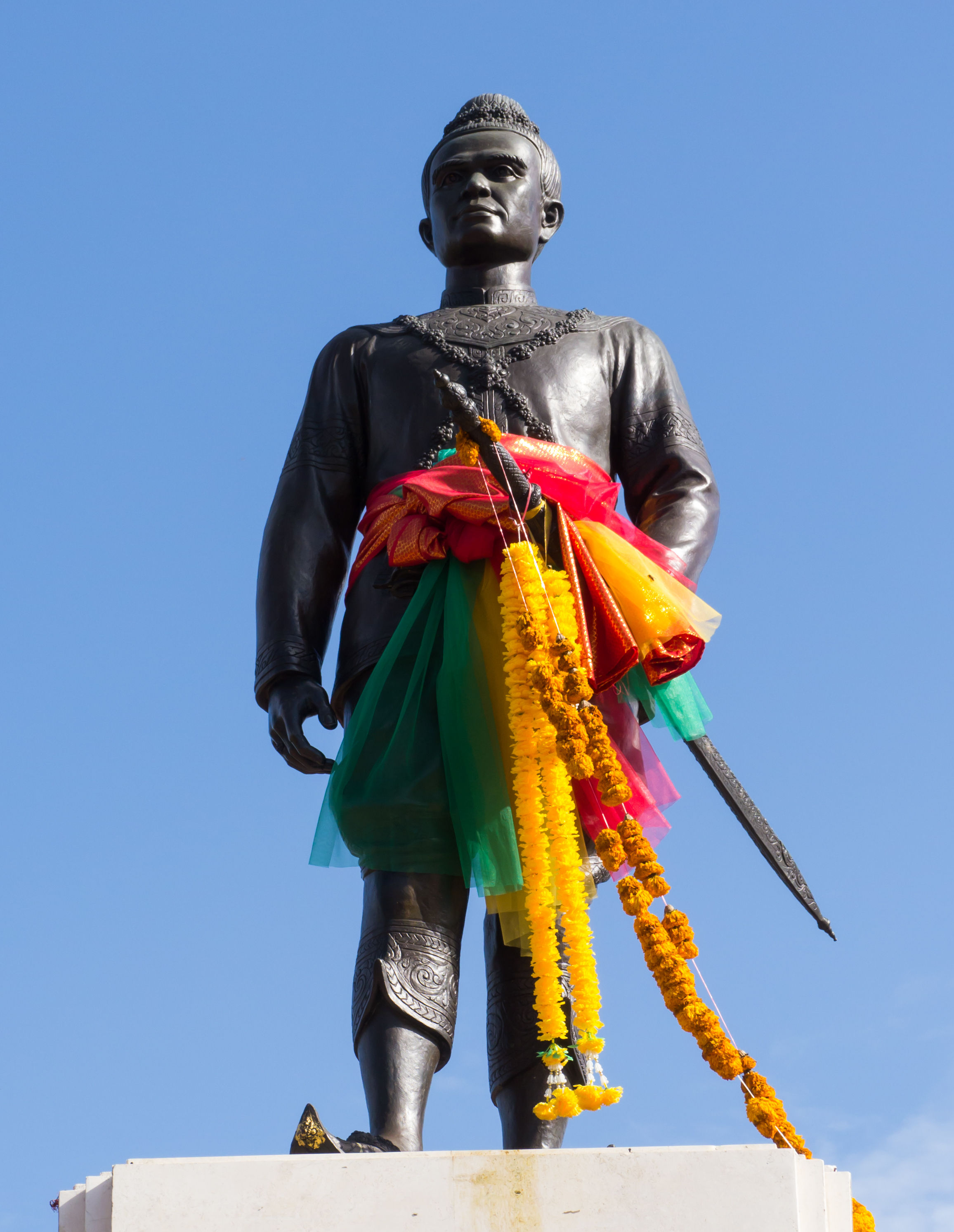
Royal Statue of King Ramathibodi I in Ayutthaya, Ayutthaya province,

== Symbols ==
According to legend, King Ramathibodi I found a beautiful conch shell buried in the ground, and chose the site as the place for his capital. He then placed the shell on a pedestal tray and built a pavilion around it. The seal shows this pavilion with the provincial tree behind it.

The provincial flower is the ดอกโสน (RTGS: dok sano) Sesbania aculeata, and the provincial tree is the fragrant manjack (Cordia dichotoma). The giant river prawn (Macrobrachium rosenbergii) is the provincial aquatic life. The provincial slogan ราชธานีเก่า อู่ข้าวอู่น้ำ เลิศล้ำกานท์กวี คนดีศรีอยุธยา เลอคุณค่ามรดกโลก can be translated as "The old capital, a land flowing with milk and honey, excellent literature, the good people of Ayutthaya, the treasured world heritage".

Gallery

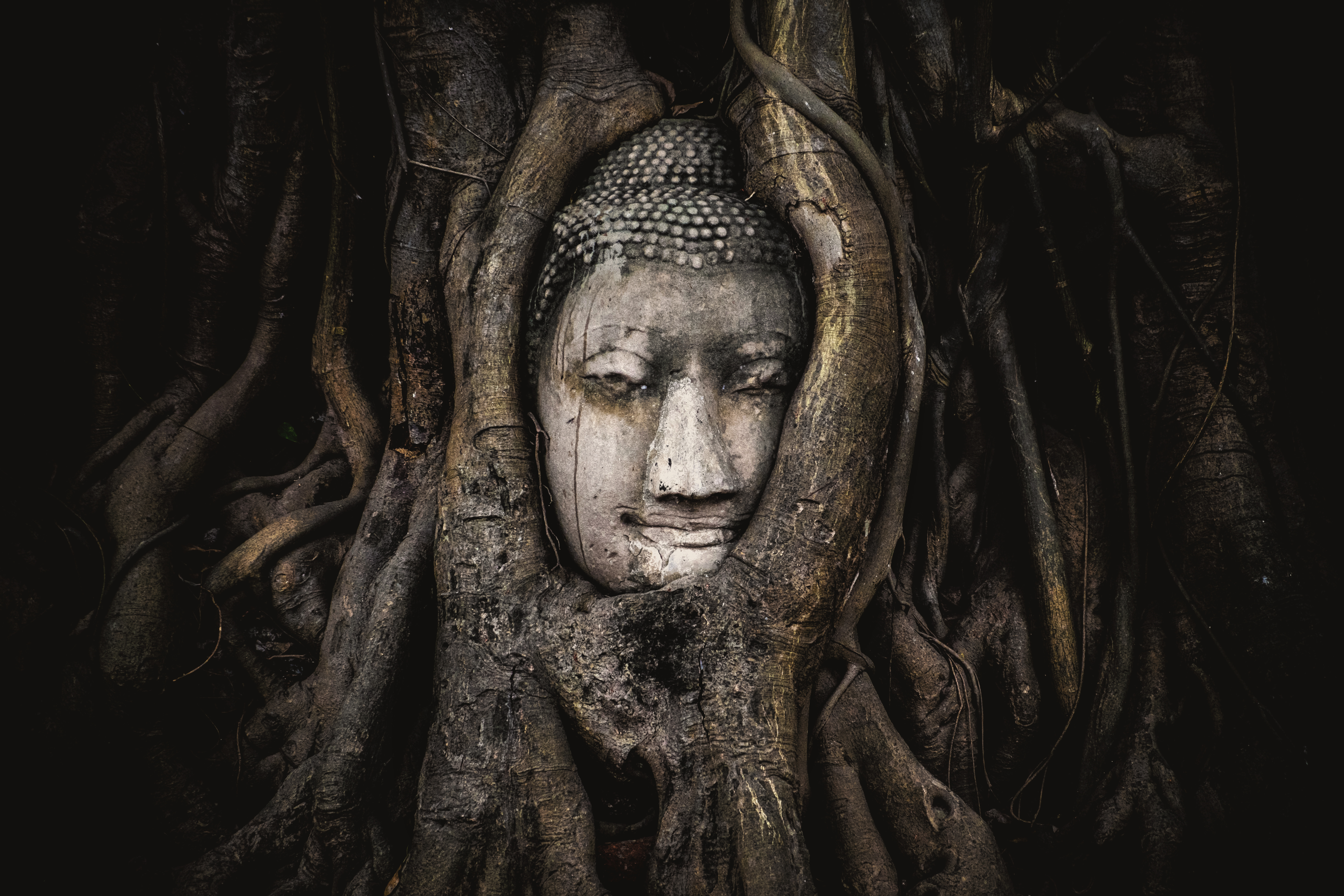
Buddha head overgrown by fig tree, Wat Mahathat, Ayutthaya historical park

== Administrative divisions ==
=== Provincial government ===
The province is divided into sixteen districts (amphoe), 209 subdistricts (tambon) and 1,328 villages (muban). Ayutthaya is unique among the provinces of Thailand in that the district of its seat of government is not called Mueang District Ayutthaya, as the common scheme would suggest, but rather Phra Nakhon Si Ayutthaya District:

District names		Map
Phra Nakhon Si Ayutthaya	Phachi	Map of 16 districts
Tha Ruea	Lat Bua Luang	Map of 16 districts
Nakhon Luang	Wang Noi	Map of 16 districts
Bang Sai (1404)	Sena	Map of 16 districts
Bang Ban	Bang Sai (1413)	Map of 16 districts
Bang Pa-in	Uthai	Map of 16 districts
Bang Pahan	Maha Rat	Map of 16 districts
Phak Hai	Ban Phraek	Map of 16 districts

=== Local government ===
As of 26 November 2019 there are: one Phra Nakhon Si Ayutthaya Provincial Administration Organisation (ongkan borihan suan changwat) and 36 municipal (thesaban) areas in the province. Ayutthaya municipality has city (thesaban nakhon) status. Ayothaya, Bang Ban, Phak Hai and Sena municipalities have town (thesaban mueang) status. Further 31 subdistrict municipalities (thesaban tambon). The non-municipal areas are administered by 121 Subdistrict Administrative Organisations - SAO (ongkan borihan suan tambon).

== Economy ==
=== Economic output ===
In 2022, Ayutthaya province had an economic output of 418.104 billion baht (US$11.0 billion). This amounts to per capita gross provincial product (GPP) of 456,286 baht (US$12,000). In 2024 the total labourforce was 542,038 of which 531,858 persons were employed in economic activity. In agriculture and fishing 23,677 persons (4.5%) were employed and in the non-agricultural sector 508,181 persons (95.5%).

Gross Provincial Product (GPP)
	Activities	Baht	Percent
1	Manufacturing	256,328,000,000	61.3
2	Trade	49,011,000,000	11.7
3	Energy	17,540,000,000	4.2
4	Transportation	17,085,000,000	4.1
5	Agriculture and fishing	11,373,000,000	2.7
6	Scientific activity	10,425,000,000	2.5
7	Finance	9,513,000,000	2.3
8	Defence + publ.admin.	7,555,000,000	1.8
9	Education	7,228,000,000	1.7
10	Construction	6,637,000,000	1.6
11	Real estate	5,430,000,000	1.3
12	Human health	5,124,000,000	1.2
13	Hotel and restaurant	4,014,000,000	1.0
14	Mining	3,015,000,000	0.7
15	Administration	2,733,000,000	0.7
16	Other service activity	1,924,000,000	0.5
17	Information	1,643,000,000	0.4
18	Water supply	969,000,000	0.2
19	Pastime	557,000,000	0.1
	Total	418,104,000,000	100

Employed persons
	Activities	Workforce	Percent
1	Manufacturing	202,457	38.0
2	Trade	81,654	15.4
3	Hotel and restaurant	45,796	8.6
4	Transportation	44,482	8.4
5	Defence and publ.admin.	26,883	5.2
6	Agriculture and fishing	23,677	4.5
7	Human health	17,790	3.3
8	Other service activity	16,916	3.2
9	Construction	16,506	3.1
10	Education	15,225	2.9
11	Administration	13,491	2.5
12	Real estate	5,579	1.0
13	Finance	4,188	0.8
14	Energy	4,176	0.8
15	Pastime	3,280	0.6
16	Mining	2,975	0.6
17	Information	2,338	0.4
18	Scientific activity	2,218	0.4
19	Water supply	1,304	0.2
20	Household enterprise	923	0.1
	Total	531,858	100

Honda has an automobile factory in the province. Honda produces hybrid electric vehicles (HEVs) and batteries for electric vehicles there, and at its factory in Prachin Buri. Honda's Ayutthaya factory has an annual capacity of 300,000 units.

== Health ==
Ayutthaya's main hospital is Phra Nakhon Si Ayutthaya Hospital, operated by the Ministry of Public Health.

== Education ==
=== Primary and secondary education ===
There are over 400 schools in the province. Notable ones are Ayutthaya Wittayalai School, which is the main provincial school of Ayutthaya, it was founded in 1905 as "Krung-Kao Provincial Model School". Chomsurang Upatham School, an all-girls provincial school founded in 1917 by Queen Saovabha Phongsri. The Laboratory School of Phranakhon Si Ayutthaya Rajabhat University, commonly called Satit Ayutthaya, a laboratory school under Phranakhon Si Ayutthaya Rajabhat University.

=== Higher education ===
There are several higher institutions in Ayutthaya. Phranakhon Si Ayutthaya Rajabhat University is a public university located in the Ayutthaya Island. It was founded in 1905 by King Chulalongkorn as "Krung-Kao Teacher Training College". Mahachulalongkornrajavidyalaya University is the oldest Buddhist university in Thailand. It was founded in 1887 by King Chulalongkorn with the purpose of offering higher education to monks. Rajamangala University of Technology Suvarnabhumi, it has four campuses in Hantra, Wasukri, Suphanburi, and Nonthaburi.

== Religion ==
Religion in Phra Nakhon Si Ayutthaya
1. Buddhism (95.0%)
2. Islam (4.26%)

Other religions are: Christianity 0.35%, Confucianism 0.35% and Hinduism 0.04 %.

== Climate ==
Ayutthaya, on the central plains, historically has three seasons:

- Hot season: March – May
- Rainy season: June – October
- Cool season: November - February

Climate data for Ayutthaya
Month	Jan	Feb	Mar	Apr	May	Jun	Jul	Aug	Sep	Oct	Nov	Dec	Year
Mean daily maximum °C (°F)	31.0 (87.8)	33.3 (91.9)	35.4 (95.7)	35.9 (96.6)	34.3 (93.7)	32.6 (90.7)	32.0 (89.6)	31.4 (88.5)	31.3 (88.3)	31.3 (88.3)	30.7 (87.3)	30.0 (86.0)	32.4 (90.3)
Mean daily minimum °C (°F)	17.0 (62.6)	19.4 (66.9)	22.3 (72.1)	24.3 (75.7)	24.5 (76.1)	24.3 (75.7)	24.0 (75.2)	23.8 (74.8)	23.5 (74.3)	22.5 (72.5)	20.0 (68.0)	17.4 (63.3)	21.9 (71.4)
Average rainfall mm (inches)	2.4 (0.09)	18.8 (0.74)	43.5 (1.71)	67.9 (2.67)	208.0 (8.19)	223.0 (8.78)	180.8 (7.12)	260.0 (10.24)	213.9 (8.42)	167.6 (6.60)	37.1 (1.46)	0.8 (0.03)	1,423.8 (56.05)
Average rainy days	0	1	4	6	15	16	17	19	17	12	3	1	111
Source: Thai Meteorological Department

== Transport ==
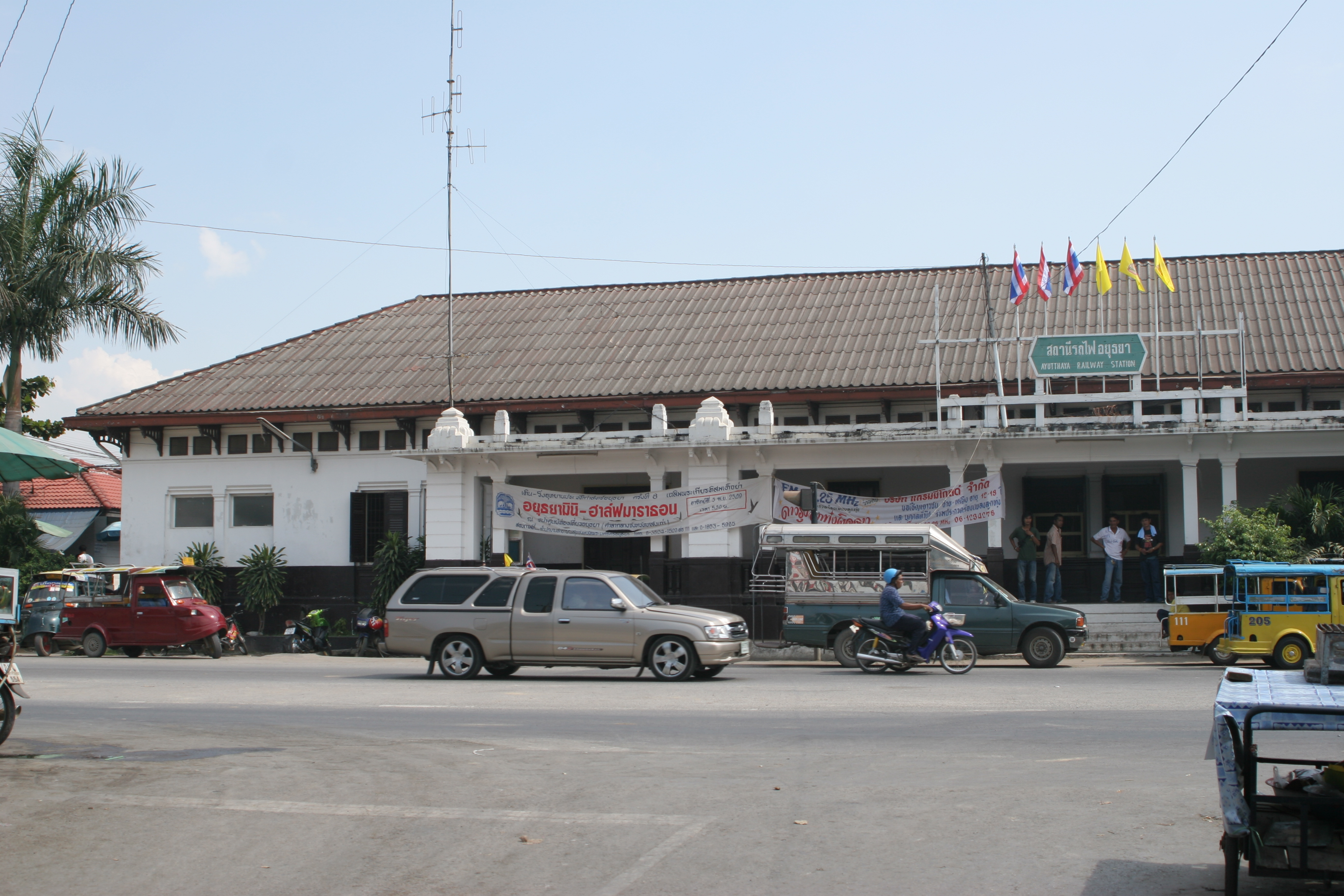
Ayutthaya Railway Station

- Rail: Ayutthaya's main station is Ayutthaya Railway Station. Ban Phachi Junction in Phachi District regarded as an important junction of the Northern and Northeastern Railway Lines. Bang Pa-in Railway Station in the southern part of the province near the Bang Pa-In Royal Palace has a royal pavilion associated with King Rama V.
- Boat: Ayutthaya has many piers that can be boarded by river cruise from Bangkok pier.

== Human achievement index 2022 ==
Health	Education	Employment	Income
12	40	3	14
Housing	Family	Transport	Participation
65	28	23	22
Province Ayutthaya, with an HAI 2022 value of 0.6770 is "high", occupies place 3 in the ranking.

Since 2003, United Nations Development Programme (UNDP) in Thailand has tracked progress on human development at sub-national level using the Human achievement index (HAI), a composite index covering all the eight key areas of human development. National Economic and Social Development Board (NESDB) has taken over this task since 2017.

Rank	Classification
1 - 13	"high"
14 - 29	"somewhat high"
30 - 45	"average"
46 - 61	"somewhat low"
62 - 77	"low"

Map with provinces and HAI 2022 rankings

== Tourism ==
Ayutthaya is 76 kilometers north of Bangkok and boasts numerous ruins. Such ruins indicate that Ayutthaya was one of Indochina's most prosperous cities. The Ayutthaya Historical Park is a vast stretch of historical sites in the heart of Ayutthaya city.

There were three palaces in Ayutthaya: Grand Palace, Chantharakasem Palace or the Front Palace, and Wang Lang or the Rear Palace. In addition, there were many other palaces and buildings for royal visits outside the city area of Phra Nakhon Si Ayutthaya, such as Bang Pa-In Palace at Bang Pa-in and Nakhon Luang Building in the Nakhon Luang District.

To promote tourism, Phra Nakhon Si Ayutthaya government has organized a light and sound show at Ayutthaya Historical Park in every beginning of the year as "Yor Yos Ying Fah: Ayutthaya World Heritage" consistently for about 10 days.

Gallery

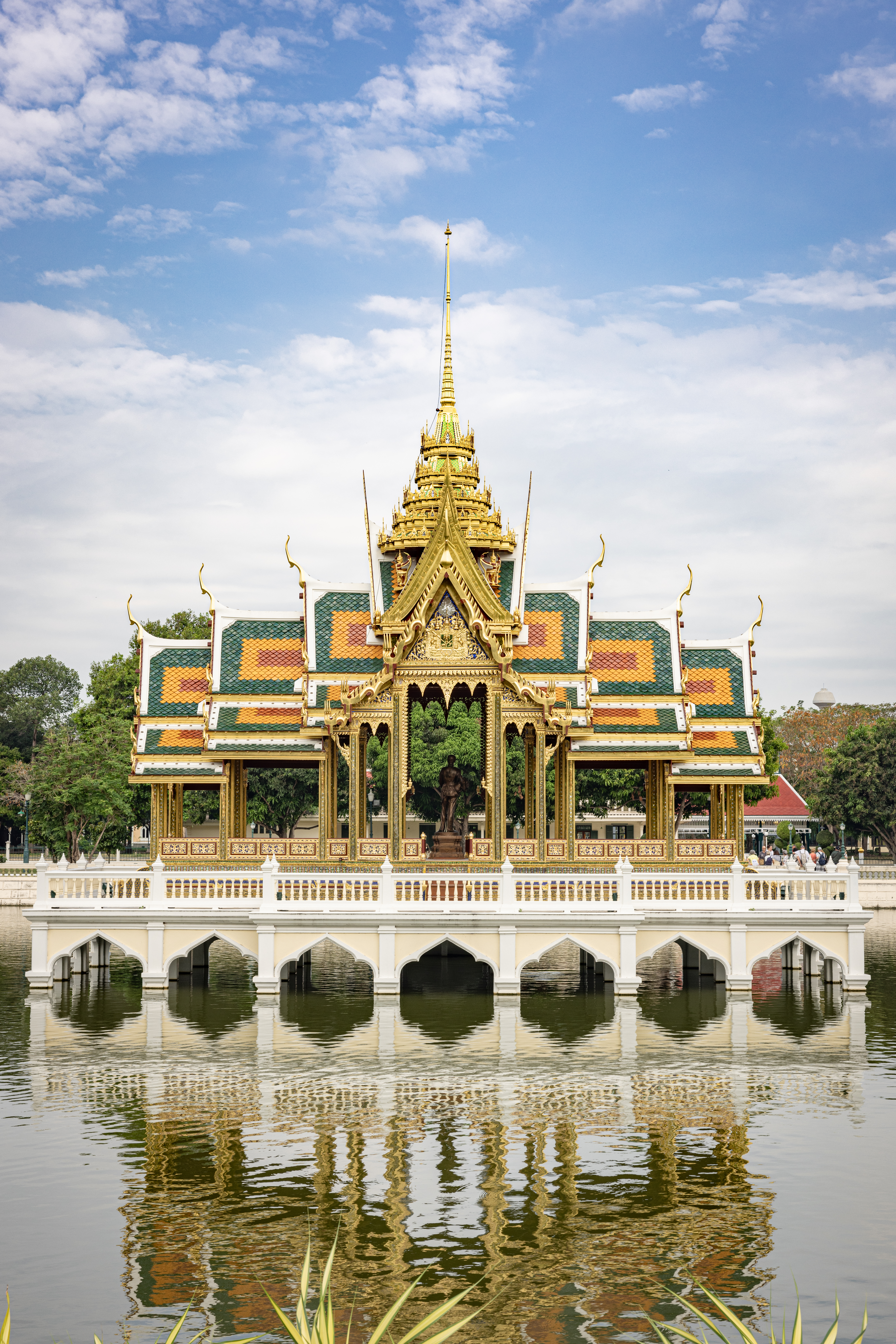
Warophat Phiman throne hall in Bang Pa-In Royal Palace

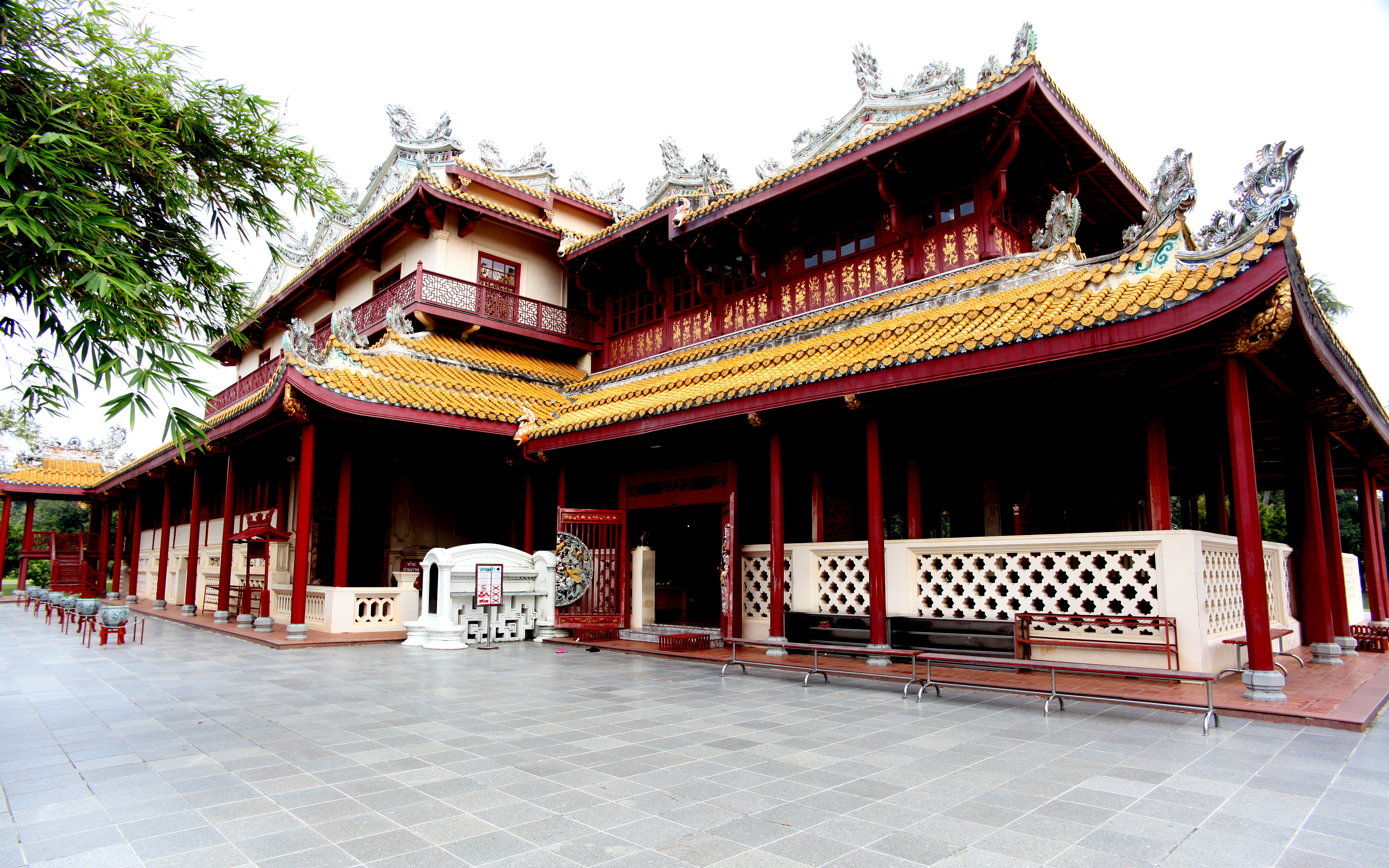
Chinese-style Palace, Bang Pa-In Royal Palace

== Local dishes ==
Phra Nakhon Si Ayutthaya is famous for many distinctive dishes, including:

- Roti sai mai: a dessert adapted from Indian roti, roti sai mai in Ayutthaya reflects the legacy of the Muslim community that has lived here since the Ayutthaya period.
- Kung maenam pao: Ayutthaya is renowned for its grilled giant river prawns. Numerous restaurants in the area proudly serve this flavourful dish.
- Ban Phachi coconut ice cream: coconut ice cream, served in small plastic cups at Ban Phachi Junction railway station, has become a popular treat among travelers and tourists. Its unique feature is that it is eaten with a straw instead of a spoon to avoid messiness when enjoyed on a moving train.
- Kuaitiao ruea: Ayutthaya is considered the origin of boat noodles, a distinctive Thai noodle dish traditionally served in small bowls. Originally sold from rowing boats, boat noodles remain a local favourite, with many noodle shops offering their own versions today.

== Notable people ==
- Somdej Toh (1788–1872), Highly revered Buddhist monk
- Luang Phor Phrom Thawaro (1884-1975), Revered Buddhist monk
- Pridi Banomyong (1900–1983), politician, the 7th prime minister of Thailand
- Thawan Thamrongnawasawat (1901–1988), navy, politician, the 8th prime minister of Thailand
- Damrong Puttan (born 1944), TV host, radio presenter, travel journalist, magazine editor, politician
- Sorapong Chatree (1950–2022), actor, singer
- Bhandit Rittakol (1951–2009), filmmaker
- Vichai Sangprapai (born 1955), police, politician, TV host
- Dieselnoi Chor Thanasukarn (born 1961), Muay Thai fighter
- Ek Rangsiroj (born 1974), actor, singer, songwriter, TV series producer and director
- Krailas Panyaroj (born 1994), professional footballer

== See also ==
- Ayutthaya Kingdom
- Ayutthaya Historical Park
- Expo 2020

== Notes ==
^{a} The city was founded on Friday, the 6th day of the waxing moon of the 5th month, 1893 Buddhist Era, corresponding to Friday, 4 March 1351 Common Era, according to the calculation of the Fine Arts Department of Thailand.
