= Netiporn Sanesangkhom =

Thai political activist (1995–2024)

- เนติพร เสน่ห์สังคม
- Born: 8 August 1995
- Died: 14 May 2024 (aged 28); Thammasat University Hospital, Pathum Thani, Thailand
- Other name: Bung Thaluwang
- Occupation: Political activist
- Years active: 2013–2024
- Known for: Leader of Thaluwang movement, Thai political prisoner, alleged lèse-majesté offender

Netiporn Sanesangkhom (Thai: เนติพร เสน่ห์สังคม; 8 August 1995 – 14 May 2024), better known as Bung (บุ้ง), was a Thai political activist focused on monarchy reform. She initially participated in protests with the People's Democratic Reform Committee (PDRC), a right-wing movement in Thailand. However, after listening to other activists about the crackdown on the Red Shirt 2010 protests at Ratchaprasong, Bung became an reformist-monarchy activist.

In 2020, Bung became a leader of a monarchy reform group—Thaluwang (lit. 'break through the palace'). As a result, she was charged with multiple criminal charges, including lèse-majesté charges. While detained on these charges, Bung and other detainees protested the Thai justice system by going on a hunger strike, which severely damaged her health. They had two demands: reform of the justice system, and to stop imprisoning political dissenters. She began a hunger strike in June 2022, which continued for 64 days. She began another hunger strike on 27 January 2024, a day after she was detained. On 14 May 2024, Bung died at Thammasat University Hospital from sudden cardiac arrest, after being transferred from the Central Women's Correctional Institution of the Department of Corrections. The total duration of Bung's temporary detention, from the start of her hunger strike protest to the day of her death, was 109 days.

However, the cause of her death remains a mystery, whether she really died from sudden cardiac arrest or due to a lack of timely medical treatment, since Thammasat University Hospital told her lawyer that the hospital found that the medical treatment from the Department of Corrections was done incorrectly. The lawyer told the press that:

... The endotracheal tube, which is normally inserted into the trachea, was mistakenly placed in the esophagus. This caused the measurement of her breathing to show zero respiration when she arrived at Thammasat University Hospital. It is unclear why no report was made, and why the treatment was concealed... The question arises whether the Department of Corrections had inserted the breathing tube into her esophagus while she was still on the bed, and if this mistake was the cause of Bung's death.

== Early life and education ==
Netiporn Sanesangkhom was born on 8 August 1995. She grew up in a law-focused family; her father was a judge, and her sister is a lawyer. She attended Triam Udom Suksa Nomklao School, where she was a student council member. She then pursued a degree in finance at the Faculty of Business Administration at Kasetsart University. In addition, she worked as a tutor, teaching English to elementary, middle, and high school students.

== Social activism ==
Bung became interested in activism beginning in high school, when she served as a student council member. As a member of the student council, she encouraged her peers to maintain proper hairstyles and adhere to uniform regulations. However, some of her friends protested against these rules, which led her to question the fairness of such regulations.

In 2014, Bung joined the People's Democratic Reform Committee protests while still in high school. However, upon entering university to study finance at the Faculty of Business Administration, Kasetsart University, Bung was exposed to a broader range of information through social media platforms like Twitter. The extensive and diverse social debates she encountered there eventually shifted her political stance.

One event that significantly influenced Bung's political change was the "Big Cleaning Day." During the event, some Bangkok residents cleaned the protest sites of the Red Shirts movement after the May 2010 crackdown, which had resulted in nearly 100 deaths and thousands of injuries. This event was seen as an attempt to erase evidence that could shed light on the truth of the crackdown and provide justice to the victims and their families.

Bung primarily focused on monarchy reform, including abolishing Section 112, the section of Thai criminal code which prohibits criticism of the monarchy.

== Charges and imprisonment ==
On 30 May 2022, the specialized prosecutor from the Office of the Special Prosecutor for Criminal Cases, Southern Bangkok 4, filed charges against eight activists and independent media members, including Bung, in the Southern Bangkok Criminal Court. The charges included "jointly defaming the King, jointly inciting unrest, jointly obstructing officials in the performance of their duties by committing offenses with three or more people, jointly insulting officials performing their duties, and jointly disobeying official orders" under Sections 112, 116, 136, 138, 140, and 368 of the Criminal Code. The key points of the indictment stated that:

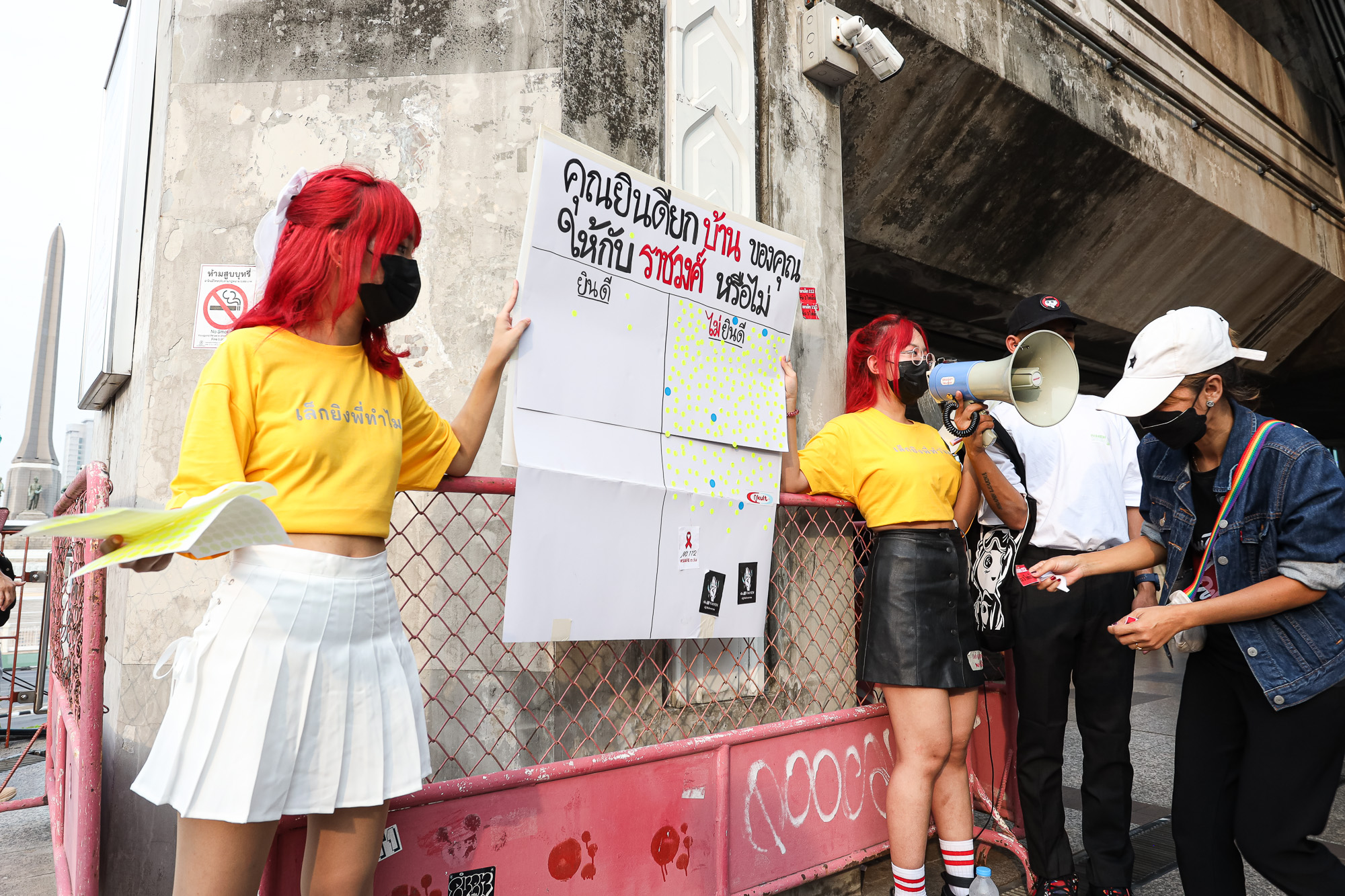
Thaluwang activists conducting a survey with the question, "Would you be willing to give your house to the royal family?" at Victory Monument on 13 March 2022

The eight defendants...jointly defamed, insulted, and showed malice towards the King, Queen, and heir-apparent by creating a large white paper banner with the question at the top: "Do you think royal motorcades cause inconvenience?" The bottom of the banner was divided into two sections, with the left side labeled "Inconvenient" and the right side labeled "Not inconvenient." This banner was displayed publicly, and green stickers were distributed for passersby and nearby individuals to place in their chosen section, thus conveying an attack on royal motorcades, a traditional practice for the safety of the King, Queen, heir-apparent, and royal family members. The intent was to convey to the public that royal motorcades caused inconvenience, thereby making statements to the public not protected under the Constitution and not intended as good-faith criticism. This act aimed to cause disorder and discontent among the populace, potentially leading to unrest in the kingdom and inciting the public to violate the law.

Bung began a hunger strike in opposition to these charges in June 2022, which continued for 64 days. She was granted bail, on the condition that she not repeat her offense.

On 26 January 2024, the Southern Bangkok Criminal Court sentenced her to one month in prison for contempt of court, referring to her October 2023 protest of the trial of another activist. She was also charged with lèse-majesté under Section 112 for a protest she staged at the Ministry of Culture on 6 August 2023, during which she sprayed paint on a flag depicting Suthida, the queen of Thailand. She was not allowed bail, due to breaking the previous condition that she not repeat a Section 112 offense. She released a letter in response, which read in part:

Once again, the justice system that has called Bung the descendant of judges since she was young has repeatedly disappointed her. The court chooses to protect the powerful who have stolen the people's power, but crushes its own descendants to protect a few groups. It's utterly shameful. Today, Bung asserts that the justice system must be reformed. No one should be imprisoned just for holding different views. Do not think that imprisoning Bung this time will make her back down. The court, which should be the last refuge for the people, must stand firm and stop serving those who orchestrate coups. Otherwise, do not take pride in sitting in your ivory tower stained with the blood of the people. Power belongs to the people; you merely stole it. In the future, I will remember this and hold every corrupt judge accountable.

Bung was housed at Central Women's Correctional Institution.

Bung began a hunger strike in protest of the charges against her on 27 January 2024, a day after she was detained. In February, she wrote a will and indicated that she wishes her body to be donated to Thammasat University Hospital. According to the Corrections Department, she began eating and drinking again on 4 April, while hospitalized, but was anemic and had low electrolytes, which she refused treatment for. However, the autopsy results from the day after her death revealed that there was no food in her stomach.

== Criticism ==
On 9 August 2023, Benjamaporn Nivas, a former member of Thaluwang and an alleged lèse-majesté offender, who is currently a refugee in Canada, made allegations on Twitter against Bung. She accused Bung of manipulating children to join activities, claiming that she was coerced and exploited for the movement's benefits, particularly during protests, to secure funding from international pro-democracy organizations.

In contrast, Yok, a member of Thaluwang, used her personal Facebook page to affirm that Bung supported and took good care of her, always suggesting that she take breaks from activities and that it was Yok who asked to stay with Bung however she didn’t go Bung’s funeral even invite from Friends.Additionally, other activists have expressed their support for Bung. Baipor—Nachanich Duangmusit, a Thaluwang member and activist who fasted alongside Bung while in detention, posted on her personal Facebook that Bung never coerced or manipulated anyone, believing in everyone's individual intellect. Similarly, Anna Ananannon, an activist from the group Bad Student, who frequently protested with Bung and Yok, tweeted that she was never forced into any actions while she had participated in activities with Bung.

== Death and public reaction ==
On 14 May 2024, Bung died at Thammasat University Hospital from sudden cardiac arrest at the age of 28. According to Krisadang Nutcharus, a lawyer from the Thai Lawyers for Human Rights Center, Bung's family confirmed that her condition had deteriorated to the point where no vital signs could be detected, suspected to be caused by prolonged hunger striking prior to her death.

Kittithat Sriamrung, one of Bung's friends, stood firm on three demands:

1. Thailand should not be a member of the United Nations Human Rights Council
2. The country should reform its judicial system, ensuring that those charged under Section 112 and political prisoners receive bail rights
3. No political dissidents should be imprisoned.

Kittithat concluded by expressing a desire to uphold these three demands in Thai society and to continue Bung's mission, ensuring that her efforts were not in vain.

In response to the news, a large number of citizens and activists gathered in front of the Southern Bangkok Criminal Court for 1 hour and 12 minutes to commemorate Bung.

=== Political response ===
The Move Forward Party posted condolences for Bung's death on their social media, emphasizing the importance of rights and freedoms of expression in a democratic society. They stressed that no one should be imprisoned simply for holding different political views and that everyone should have the right to bail. These rights, according to the constitution, should be guaranteed regardless of political affiliation. They also highlighted the danger of risking lives in political struggles and called for the creation of safe spaces to resolve political conflicts, both past and present. They urged for the restoration of confidence in the justice system for all people. Many key members of both the Move Forward Party and Future Forward Party also posted about Bung's death. Pannika Wanich questioned whether someone had to die before society realized that individuals with differing views should not die or be imprisoned. She emphasized that many are still imprisoned without bail and that three people are still on hunger strike in jails. Rangsiman Rome expressed sadness over Bung's death and emphasized that regardless of agreement or disagreement with her actions, everyone should have the right to bail to fight fully. Such losses, he argued, result from withdrawal of bail without legal grounds, and responsibility lies with the judiciary for those who have lost their lives. Wiroj Lakkhanaadisorn stated that no one should be detained simply for differing political views, and no one should lose their lives just because of differing opinions. The right to bail is a fundamental right in the justice process that every citizen should receive from the state.

Major General Tawee Sodsong, the Permanent Secretary of the Ministry of Justice, told the press that Prime Minister Srettha Thavisin has been informed but there has been no comment or official statement from the Pheu Thai Party yet. Until a day after the incident, Prime Minister Srettha Thavisin expressed his condolences to Bung, stating that the right to bail and the release of political activists during pre-trial detention will be discussed soon to ensure fairness for everyone, but he has not yet addressed the judicial system reform, the abolition of Section 112, or the amnesty for lèse-majesté prisoners, even though these were part of his election campaign. Nattawut Saikuar, a former member of Pheu Thai Party, expressed his condolences and concluded that no one should lose their lives due to differing opinions. He hoped that this incident would be the last and called for the remaining children to be released.

Justice Minister Tawee Sodsong announced that an autopsy would be performed on Bung's body, and a committee would be created to investigate her death.

=== Human rights groups ===
The Office of the United Nations High Commissioner for Human Rights of Asia Pacific expressed condolences for Bung's death and emphasized the need for reforms in the judicial process and the restoration of rights to political prisoners. They urged Thailand to conduct a transparent and fair investigation into Bung's death, emphasizing the fundamental rights to freedom of expression and assembly. On the same day, various ambassadors and diplomatic representatives in Thailand, including Robert F. Godec (US Ambassador to Thailand), Jon Thorgaard (Danish Ambassador to Thailand), David Daly (EU Ambassador to Thailand), and the Swedish Embassy, also expressed condolences for Bung's death. Ernst Reichel, the German Ambassador to Thailand, not only expressed condolences for Bung's death but also emphasized that the incident was a tragedy of youth involved in political movements, occurring while under pre-trial detention and after a long period of hunger strike.

The Thai branch of Amnesty International called her death "a shocking reminder that Thai authorities are denying activists their right to temporary release on bail and using detention to silence the peaceful expression of dissent". A similar sentiment was shared by Thai Lawyers for Human Rights, who called her death "evidence that the problems of political prosecution and detention of pro-democracy activists, especially in lèse-majesté cases, are still very much alive under the Pheu Thai government," and by Human Rights Watch senior researcher Sunai Phasuk, who said Bung's death "shows how brutal the punishment for royal defamation is in Thailand".

Clooney Foundation urged Thailand to stop the detention of people who criticized the monarchy

== Film ==
A documentary titled Hungry for Freedom (2023), directed by Thai filmmaker Rachata Thongruay, chronicles Netiporn's life and activism. The film received nominations for the IDA Documentary Awards, a One World Media Award, and a 2024 Grierson Award.
