= Buddhasothorn Hospital =

Buddhasothorn Hospital โรงพยาบาลพุทธโสธร
- The Ministry of Public Health Health District 6

Geography
- Location: 174 Maruphong Road, Nai Mueang Subdistrict, Mueang Chachoengsao District, Chachoengsao 24000, Thailand
- Coordinates: 13.686075°N 101.073751°E

Organisation
- Type: Regional
- Affiliated university: Faculty of Medicine, Thammasat University

Services
- Beds: 595

History
- Former name: Mueang Chachoengsao Hospital
- Opened: 1935

Links
- Website: www.bsh.go.th
- Lists: Hospitals in Thailand

Buddhasothorn Hospital (Thai: โรงพยาบาลพุทธโสธร) is the main hospital of Chachoengsao Province, Thailand and is classified under the Ministry of Public Health as a regional hospital. It has a CPIRD Medical Education Center which trains doctors for the Faculty of Medicine of Thammasat University.

== History ==
In 1935, a health station opened along the banks of the Bang Pakong River in Chachoengsao Town, operating under the management of the Mueang Chachoengsao Municipality. It expanded into a hospital in 1939 and was named Mueang Chachoengsao Hospital. In 1950, the hospital was transferred to the Department of Medical Services, MOPH. In 1974, the hospital was again transferred to the Office of the Permanent Secretary, MOPH. On 22 June 2011, the hospital was renamed Buddhasothorn Hospital in reverence of the 'Luangpho Phuttha Sothon' buddhist image at Wat Sothonwararam.

On 19 July 2007, the hospital cooperated with the Faculty of Medicine, Thammasat University to train doctors as part of the Collaborative Project to Increase Rural Doctor (CPIRD) Program.

== See also ==
- Healthcare in Thailand
- Hospitals in Thailand
- List of hospitals in Thailand
