= Samut Prakan Hospital =

Samut Prakan Hospital โรงพยาบาลสมุทรปราการ
- The Ministry of Public Health Health District 6

Geography
- Location: 71 Chakkaphak Road, Pak Nam Subdistrict, Mueang Samut Prakan District, Samut Prakan 10270, Thailand

Organisation
- Type: Regional
- Affiliated university: Faculty of Medicine, Srinakharinwirot University

Services
- Beds: 594

History
- Former name: Samut Prakan Health Station
- Founded: 1 December 1950 (as Samut Prakan Hospital)

Links
- Website: smpkhos.go.th
- Lists: Hospitals in Thailand

Samut Prakan Hospital (Thai: โรงพยาบาลสมุทรปราการ) is the main hospital of Samut Prakan Province, Thailand. It is classified under the Ministry of Public Health as a regional hospital. It is an affiliated hospital of the Faculty of Medicine, Srinakharinwirot University.

== History ==
Initially, Samut Prakan Health Station was the first healthcare facility in Pak Nam Samut Prakan town. with a capacity of 25 beds and operated by the Samut Prakan City Municipality. On 1 December 1950, operations were transferred to the Ministry of Public Health and renamed Samut Prakan Hospital. Due to expansion difficulties, the hospital was moved to the current site and opened on 27 September 1965. Today it is a regional hospital with a capacity of 594 beds as of 2022.

The closest urban transit station is Sai Luat BTS station.

== See also ==
- Healthcare in Thailand
- Hospitals in Thailand
- List of hospitals in Thailand
