= Phukphong Phongpetra =

Thai police officer

Police Lieutenant General Phukphong Phongpetra พล.ต.ท. ภัคพงศ์ พงษ์เภตรา KGTC MPCh C.M.M
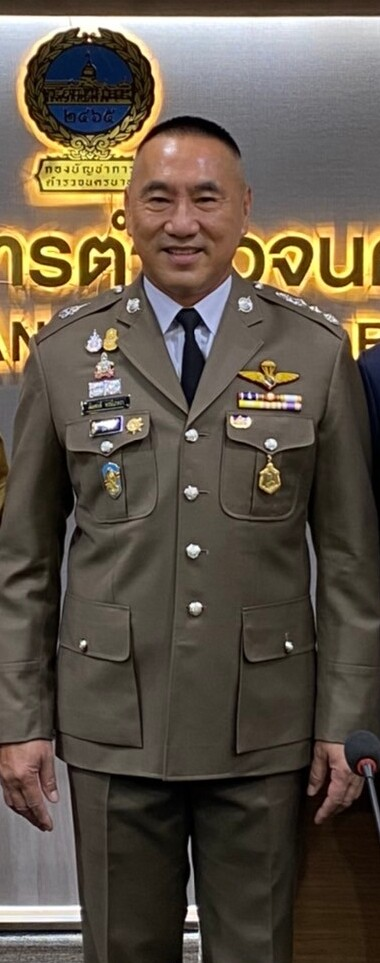

Commissioner of the Metropolitan Police Bureau
- In office 1 October 2019 – 30 September 2021
- Preceded by: Sutipong Wongpin
- Succeeded by: Samran Nuanma

Personal details
- Born: 26 July 1961 (age 65) Surat Thani, Thailand
- Spouse: Pimkamon Udomslip
- Children: 1
- Education: Assumption College Sriracha; Armed Forces Academies Preparatory School; Royal Police Cadet Academy
- Profession: Police officer
- Awards: Knight Grand Cordon (Special Class) of The Most Noble Order of the Crown of Thailand; Knight Grand Cross (First Class) of The Most Exalted Order of the White Elephant; Chakra Mala Medal
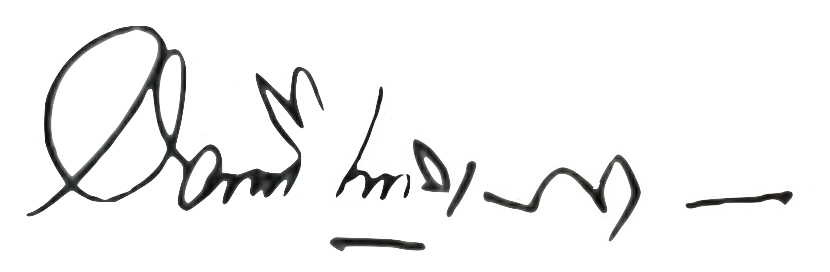
- Signature

Military service
- Branch/service: Metropolitan Police Bureau
- Years of service: 1985 - 2021
- Rank: Police Lieutenant General

Phukphong Phongpetra (Thai: ภัคพงศ์ พงษ์เภตรา; RTGS: Phukphong Phongpetra; born 26 July 1961) is a Thai police officer. He is the former Commissioner of the Metropolitan Police Bureau of the Royal Thai Police. Police Lieutenant General (พล.ต.ท.) Phukphong was appointed to the Commissioner of the Metropolitan Police Bureau on October 1, 2019. He retired on 30 September, 2021, and was succeeded by Samran Nuanma.

Pol. Lt. Gen. Phukphong, known for his leadership skills and expertise in protection and crowd control, played a crucial role in resolving both the 2010 Thai protests and 2020 Thai protests.

== Early life and education ==
Phukphong was born in Surat Thani on 26 July 1961. Phukphong was brought up in a family in Surat Thani.

After graduating from Assumption College Siracha, a private, prestigious boarding school for boys in Chonburi province, Phukphong enrolled in the Armed Forces Academies Preparatory School (AFAPS) (Class 22). Later, he continued his education and graduated in the 38th Class at the Royal Police Cadet Academy (RPCA).

Phukphong also graduated from special training abroad, including Tactical Operations Seminar from the Virginia Public Safety Academy in Fairfax, Virginia. In addition, Phukphong is an alumni at the National Defence College of Thailand (Class 59).

== Career ==
=== Beginnings ===
Phukphong began his career as a Deputy Inspector of Investigation at Muang Surat Thani Police Station, his hometown. Later, he was promoted to many ranks in different lines of work in the police form, finally becoming the Deputy Commander at Surat Thani Province in 2008.

=== Protection and Crowd Control Division ===
In 2009, Pol. Lt. Gen. Phukphong was transferred to work on special operations in Southern Thailand, and subsequently was put in charge of the Protection and Crowd Control Division.

After political unrest came to an end in Thailand, Pol. Lt. Gen. Phukphong was promoted to Commissioner of Metropolitan Police Bureau Division 9.

=== Metropolitan Police Bureau ===
In 2014, after the coup d'état that toppled the Pheu Thai-led administration, Pol. Lt. Gen. Phukphong was promoted to Deputy Commissioner of the Metropolitan Police Bureau, under Police General Srivara Rangsibrahmanakul (Thai: ศรีวราห์ รังสิพราหมณกุล), the Commissioner of the Metropolitan Police Bureau at that time.

"I am able to be in this position today because of my subordinates. If I were to order them and they don't follow my commands, will I succeed? The lesson I learned from my subordinates is to love and cherish them."
- Pol Lt Gen Phukphong Phongpetra

Although Pol. Lt. Gen Phukphong gained tremendous experience in maintaining stability and security in Bangkok from the various cases of investigations, the most renowned and notable incident that spurred Phukphong's introduction to the Thai public was his help in investigating the 2015 Bangkok bombing, which took place inside the Erawan Shrine at the Ratchaprasong intersection in Pathum Wan District.

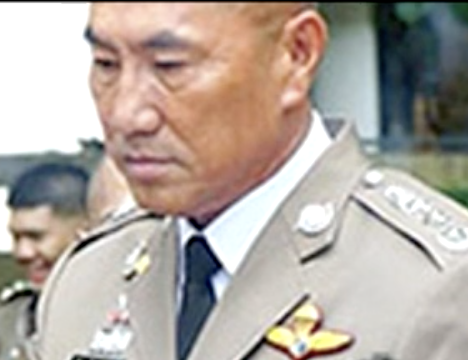
Pol. Lt. Gen. Phukphong when appointed Commissioner of the Metropolitan Police Bureau

The National Police Policy Committee, on 1 October 2019, appointed Pol. Lt. Gen. Phukphong to be the 50th Commissioner of the Metropolitan Police Bureau, replacing Pol. Lt. Gen. Sutipong Wongpin, who retired on 30 September 2019.

== Timeline of Position in the Royal Thai Police ==
Date of Appointment	Position
1 February 1985	Deputy Inspector of Inquiry Muang Surat Thani
16 July 1987	Deputy Inspector Provincial Police Region 10 (Surat Thani)
1 May 1991	Assistant Duty Officer Police Education Bureau
30 June 1991	Assistant Duty Officer Provincial Police Region 3 (Nakhon Ratchasima)
1 October 1992	Assistant to Assistant Duty Officer of the Commissioner-General of the Royal Thai Police
16 February 1994	Assistant Duty Officer of the Commissioner-General of the Royal Thai Police
1 June 1995	Assistant Duty Officer of the Deputy Commissioner-General of the Royal Thai Police
1 July 1999	Deputy Superintendent Provincial Police Division 5 Region 2 (Chonburi)
16 November 2001	Superintendent Provincial Police Division 1 Region 6 (Phitsanulok)
18 December 2003	Superintendent Provincial Police Division 1 Region 6 (Chiang Mai)
1 October 2004	Superintendent Provincial Police Division 1 Region 1 (Ayuthaya)
1 November 2005	Deputy Commander Chai Nat Provincial Police
1 November 2007	Deputy Commander Surat Thani Provincial Police
20 November 2008	Deputy Commander of Investigation Provincial Police Region 8 (Phuket)
25 November 2009	Commander of Protection and Crowd Control Division
15 November 2010	Commander of the Bangkok Metropolitan Police Bureau Division 9
1 October 2014	Commander of General Staff Bangkok Metropolitan Police Bureau Division 1
1 October 2014	Deputy Commissioner of the Bangkok Metropolitan Police Bureau
30 October 2015	Deputy Commissioner of the Bangkok Metropolitan Police Bureau Legal and Litigation Division
1 October 2019	Commissioner of the Metropolitan Police Bureau

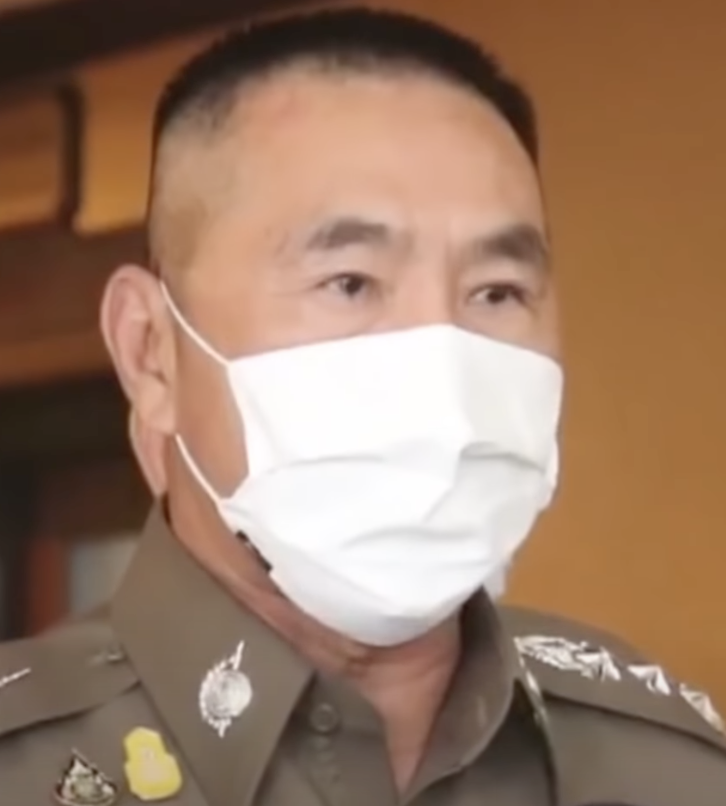
Pol. Lt. Gen. Phukphong giving an interview to reporters

== Awards ==
- Knight Grand Cordon (Special Class) (Thai: มหาวชิรมงกุฎ) of The Most Noble Order of the Crown of Thailand (Thai: เครื่องราชอิสริยาภรณ์อันมีเกียรติยศยิ่งมงกุฎไทย)
- Knight Grand Cross (First Class) (Thai: ประถมาภรณ์ช้างเผือก) of The Most Exalted Order of the White Elephant (Thai: เครื่องราชอิสริยาภรณ์อันเป็นที่เชิดชูยิ่งช้างเผือก ชั้นที่ 1)
- Chakra Mala Medal (Thai: เหรียญจักรมาลา)

== Seminars ==
- Participated in "The 14th International Asian Organized Crime Conference" Calgary, Alberta (Canada)
- Participated in "International Criminal Police Organization 62nd General Assembly Session" Aruba
- Participated in "The 16th Annual International Asian Organized Crime Conference" San Francisco, California (United States of America)
- Participated in "The 18th International Asian Organized Crime Conference" Anaheim, California (United States of America)

== See also ==
- Chakthip Chaijinda (Thai: จักรทิพย์ ชัยจินดา)
- Srivara Rangsibrahmanakul (Thai: ศรีวราห์ รังสิพราหมณกุล)

Police appointments
Preceded by Sutipong Wongpin	Commissioner of the Metropolitan Police Bureau of the Royal Thai Police; 2019–2020	Succeeded by Samran Nuama
