= Surat Thani Hospital =

Surat Thani Hospital โรงพยาบาลสุราษฎร์ธานี
- The Ministry of Public Health Health District 11

Geography
- Location: 56 Mu 2, Makham Tia Subdistrict, Mueang Surat Thani District, Surat Thani 84000, Thailand
- Coordinates: 9.124011°N 99.310004°E

Organisation
- Type: Regional
- Affiliated university: Faculty of Medicine, Thammasat University; Faculty of Medicine, Prince of Songkla University

Services
- Beds: 862

History
- Opened: 13 April 1953

Links
- Website: www.srth.moph.go.th/index.php
- Lists: Hospitals in Thailand

Surat Thani Hospital (Thai: โรงพยาบาลสุราษฎร์ธานี) is the main hospital of Surat Thani Province, Thailand. It is classified under the Ministry of Public Health as a regional hospital. It has a CPIRD Medical Education Center which trains doctors for the Faculty of Medicine of Thammasat University. It is an affiliated teaching hospital of the Faculty of Medicine, Prince of Songkla University.

== History ==
Plans for the construction of a hospital in Surat Thani surfaced in 1941, during World War II under the intention to upgrade the health provision in the province, as there was only a health station in the area. However, it was delayed due to the Japanese invasion which took place on 8 December of the same year. Funding however, gradually built up and it was decided that a hospital was built in Makham Tia Subdistrict due to good transport links, particularly as the land was next to the main highway into Surat Thani City, and was easily accessible from Surat Thani railway station. Construction began after the war in 1952 and the hospital opened as Surat Thani Hospital on 13 April 1953 with 25 beds. In 1969, with 170 beds, the hospital considered medical education possible at the hospital and a nursing school was set up.

Since 7 January 2004, the hospital was affiliated with the Collaborative Project to Increase Rural Doctors project and started training doctors for the Faculty of Medicine, Thammasat University.

== See also ==
- Healthcare in Thailand
- Hospitals in Thailand
- List of hospitals in Thailand
