= King Narai Hospital =

King Narai Hospital โรงพยาบาลพระนารายณ์มหาราช
- The Ministry of Public Health Health District 4

Geography
- Location: 260 Phahonyothin Road, Khao Sam Yot Subdistrict, Mueang Lopburi district, Lopburi 15000, Thailand
- Coordinates: 14.8049099°N 100.6525809°E

Organisation
- Type: General
- Affiliated university: Chulabhorn International College of Medicine, Thammasat University; Faculty of Medicine, Srinakharinwirot University

Services
- Beds: 550

History
- Former name: Lopburi Hospital
- Founded: 1 November 1956

Links
- Website: www.kingnaraihospital.go.th/index.php
- Lists: Hospitals in Thailand

King Narai Hospital (Thai: โรงพยาบาลพระนารายณ์มหาราช), is a hospital located in Mueang Lopburi district, Lopburi province, Thailand. It is classified under the Ministry of Public Health as a general hospital. It is a main teaching hospital for the Chulabhorn International College of Medicine, Thammasat University and an affiliated teaching hospital of the Faculty of Medicine, Srinakharinwirot University.

== History ==
Construction of Lopburi Hospital started in 1953. The hospital opened for patient treatment on 1 November 1956 and was officially opened on 6 February 1957. On 18 September 1979, King Bhumibol Adulyadej renamed the hospital as King Narai Hospital in commemoration of King Narai, a leading figure in the development of Lopburi during the Ayutthaya Kingdom. It received international hospital accreditation in 2004. It currently has a capacity of 550 beds and is a referral center for patients from Chai Nat, Ang Thong and Singburi provinces.

== See also ==
- Healthcare in Thailand
- Hospitals in Thailand
- List of hospitals in Thailand
