= Saraburi Hospital =

Saraburi Hospital โรงพยาบาลสระบุรี
- The Ministry of Public Health Health District 4

Geography
- Location: 18 Thesaban 4 Road, Pak Phriao Subdistrict, Mueang Saraburi District, Saraburi 18000, Thailand
- Coordinates: 14.534514°N 100.915730°E

Organisation
- Type: Regional
- Affiliated university: Faculty of Medicine, Thammasat University

Services
- Beds: 700

History
- Opened: 14 January 1954

Links
- Website: www.srbr.in.th
- Lists: Hospitals in Thailand

Saraburi Hospital (Thai: โรงพยาบาลสระบุรี) is the main hospital of Saraburi Province, Thailand and is classified under the Ministry of Public Health as a regional hospital. It has a CPIRD Medical Education Center which trains doctors for the Faculty of Medicine of Thammasat University.

== History ==
Saraburi Hospital was first constructed in 1951, the fourth hospital outside Bangkok and initially had one building. The hospital was officially opened on 14 January 1954. In 1972-1976, the hospital was designated to be a regional hospital in Central Thailand, under the Third National Economic and Development Plan and was expanded to 600 beds. The hospital became classified as a regional hospital in 1981.

In 1993, the hospital made an agreement with the Faculty of Medicine, Thammasat University to train medical students at clinical years 4 and 5 in the fields of internal medicine, surgery, obstetrics and gynaecology, paediatrics and anaesthesiology. Teaching of students under the Collaborative Project to Increase Production of Rural Doctors (CPIRD) was started in 1995, when a Medical Education Center was built at Saraburi Hospital.

== See also ==
- Healthcare in Thailand
- Hospitals in Thailand
- List of hospitals in Thailand
