= Police General Hospital =

Police General Hospital โรงพยาบาลตำรวจ
- The Royal Thai Police

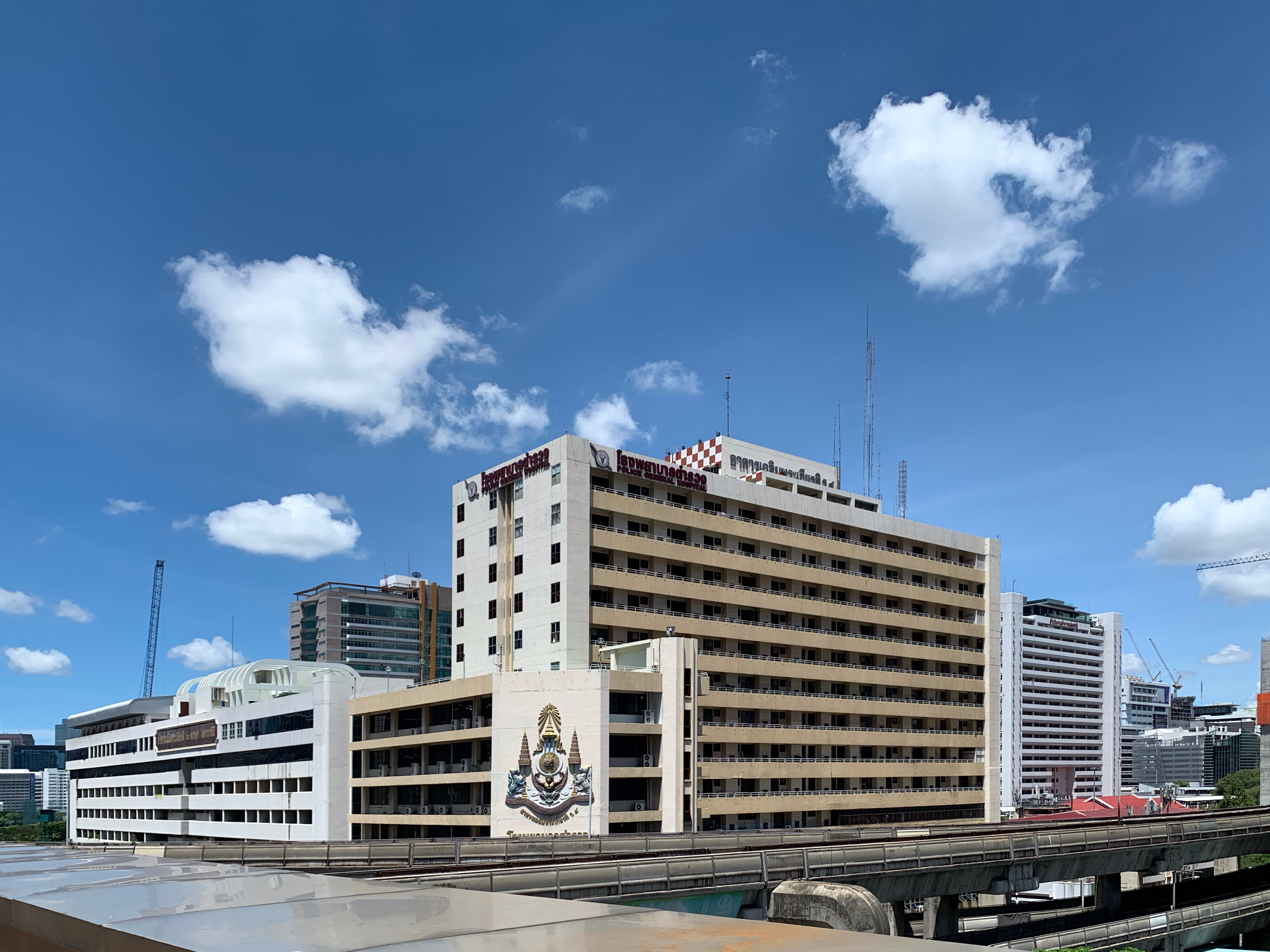

Geography
- Location: 492/1 Rama I Road, Pathum Wan Subdistrict, Pathum Wan, Bangkok, Thailand
- Coordinates: 13°44′33″N 100°32′19″E

Organisation
- Type: Teaching, Police
- Affiliated university: HRH Princess Chulabhorn College of Medical Science; Faculty of Medicine, Srinakharinwirot University; Royal Thai Police Nursing College

Services
- Beds: 650

History
- Founded: 13 October 1952 (as Police General Hospital)

Links
- Website: www.policehospital.org

Police General Hospital (Thai: โรงพยาบาลตำรวจ) is a hospital located in Pathum Wan District, Bangkok, Thailand. It is a police hospital for the Royal Thai Police and a teaching hospital for HRH Princess Chulabhorn College of Medical Science, the Faculty of Medicine, Srinakharinwirot University as well as the Royal Thai Police Nursing College.

== History ==
In 1897, a hospital was constructed near Phlapphla Chai for the treatment of sexually transmitted infections in prostitutes in the area. The following year, the hospital was renamed Patrol Hospital and assigned to the Royal Thai Police Medical Division as a police hospital and as a place that official autopsies could be conducted. In 1915 the hospital was renamed Klang Hospital and was reassigned to the Medical Services Division of the Ministry of the Interior. The police's medical division was moved to the Phra Ratchawang Metropolitan Police Station on Sanam Chai Road.

In 1952, the division was elevated to a hospital status and renamed Police General Hospital and was allocated a site on Rama I Road in the grounds of the Royal Thai Police Headquarters. In 1979, the Medical Division became the Office of the Surgeon General, with Police General Hospital becoming one of its units.

It was previously a teaching hospital for the School of Medicine, Siam University between 2013 and 2015.

A viral video circulated online after a surgeon of the hospital performed outdoor surgery after an emergency evacuation due to the tremors felt from the 2025 Myanmar earthquake.

=== 14th Floor Scandal ===
Upon the return of former prime minister Thaksin Shinawatra to Thailand and subsequent arrest on 22 August 2023, Thaksin was moved from Bangkok Remand Prison within 13 hours of his detention and taken to Police General Hospital, where he remained on the VIP 14th floor of the hospital until February 2024. He cited his severe health issues including spondylolisthesis, hepatitis B and heart disease of which the Department of Corrections hospital claimed to not be equipped to handle.

On 8 May 2025, following investigations into the case, the Medical Council of Thailand suspended the medical licenses of two doctors and issued a warning to a third doctor at the hospital for providing false information regarding Thaksin's health and necessity for transfer from the correctional facility.

== See also ==
- Healthcare in Thailand
- Hospitals in Thailand
- List of hospitals in Thailand
