= Surat Thani =

City in southern Thailand

Surat Thani สุราษฎร์ธานี
- City Municipality
- City of Surat Thani เทศบาลนครสุราษฎร์ธานี
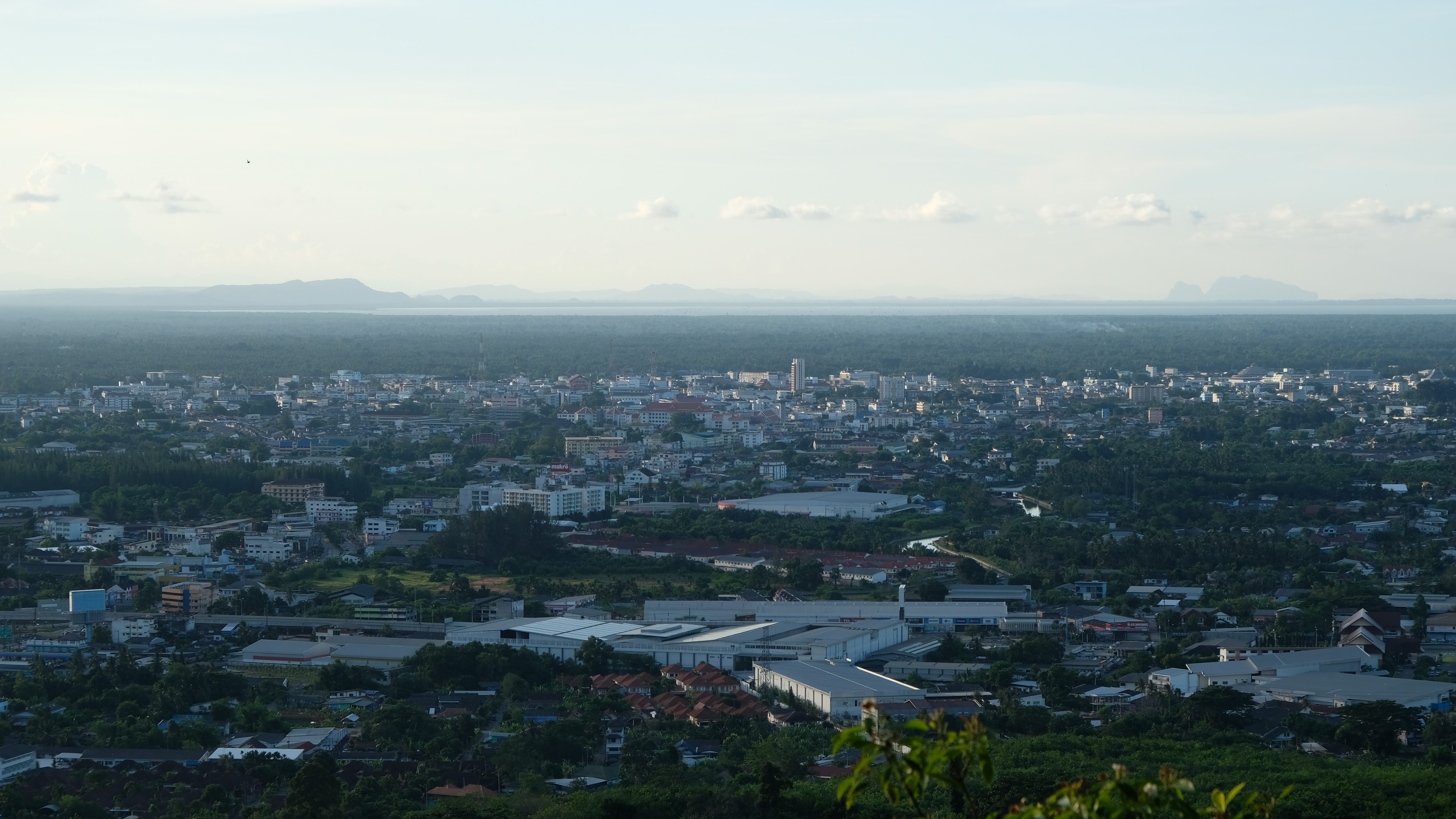
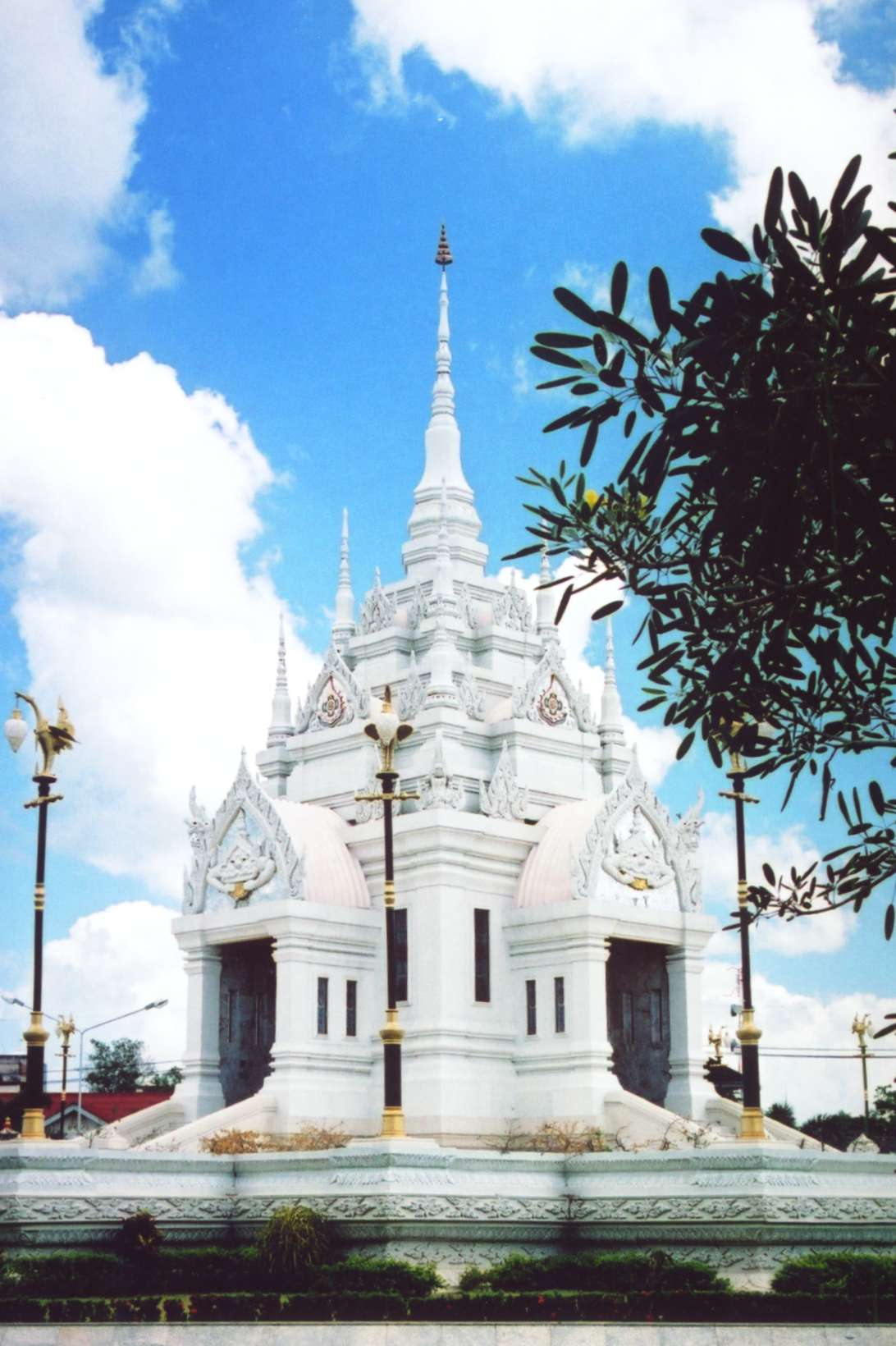
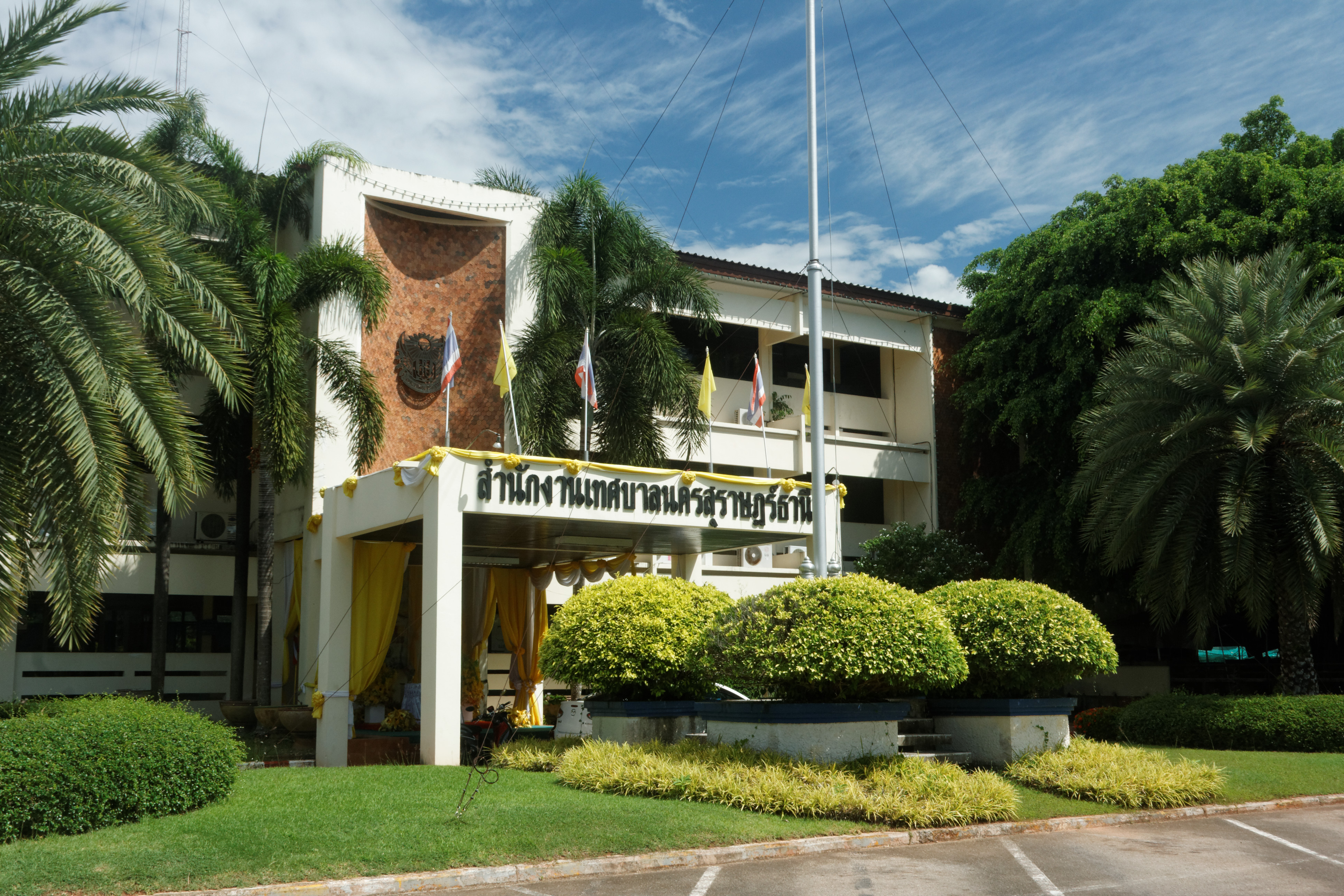
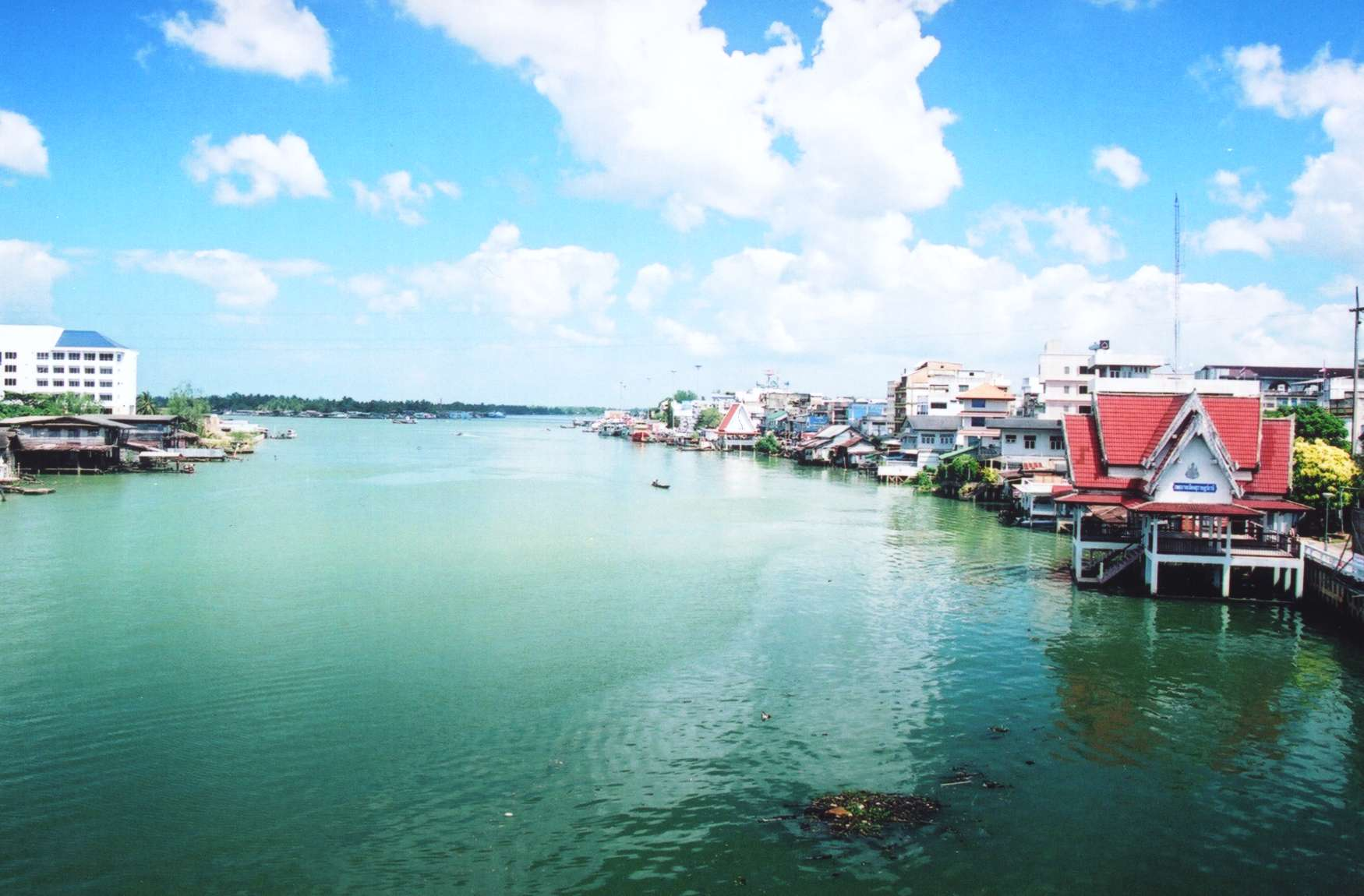
- From top left: Skyline of Surat Thani, City Pillar Shrine of Surat Thani, municipal office, Tapi River flowing through Surat Thani

- Seal

- Location of Surat Thani

- Location in Thailand
- Coordinates: 9°8′23″N 99°19′50″E
- Country: Thailand
- Province: Surat Thani
- District: Mueang Surat Thani
- Sanitation: 21 December 1930
- Town municipality: 7 December 1935
- City municipality: 4 May 2007

Government
  - Mayor: Theerakit Wangmuthitakul

Area
  - Total: 68.97 km^{2} (26.63 sq mi)
  - Rank: 5th
- Elevation: 10 m (33 ft)

Population (2019)
  - Total: 132,040 (Registered residents)
  - Rank: 6th in Thailand
  - Density: 1,914/km^{2} (4,960/sq mi)
- Time zone: UTC+7 (ICT)
- Postcode: 84000
- Calling code: 077
- Website: suratcity.go.th

Surat Thani (Thai: สุราษฎร์ธานี, pronounced [sù.râːt tʰāː.nīː]) is a city in Amphoe Mueang Surat Thani, Surat Thani Province, southern Thailand. It lies 651 km (405 mi) south of Bangkok. It is the capital of Surat Thani Province. The city has a population of 132,040 (2019), and an area of 68.97 km^{2} (26.63 sq mi). The city's population density is 1,914 inhabitants per km^{2}.

Surat Thani is located near the mouth of the Tapi River on the Gulf of Thailand. The city offers no major tourist attractions in itself, and is mainly known to tourists as the jumping-off point to Ko Samui, Ko Tao, and Ko Pha Ngan. It is the regional commercial center, with a seaport dealing in the main products of the province, rubber and coconuts.

== Toponymy ==
The city received its name, which means "city of good people", by King Vajiravudh (Rama VI) in 1915. The name was given to the city due to the intense devotion of the locals to Buddhism. Previously the city was known as Bandon (Thai: บ้านดอน), meaning "village on higher ground". The name of the city is taken from the Indian city Surat in Gujarat on the Indian River Tapi. King Vajiravudh (Rama VI) gave this name to his city as he was impressed with the Indian city.

== History ==
On 21 December 1930 Surat Thani became a sanitary district (sukhaphiban), which was upgraded to a town (thesaban mueang) on 7 December 1935, with a municipal area of 2.67 km^{2} (1.03 sq mi). The area of the municipality was enlarged to 6.95 km^{2} (2.68 sq mi) on 14 October 1958, and on 22 December 1994 it was further enlarged to 68.97 km^{2} (26.63 sq mi). On 4 May 2007, the town was upgraded to city status (thesaban nakhon).

== Transportation ==
=== Rail ===
Surat Thani is connected with Bangkok by the Southern Line of the State Railway of Thailand. Surat Thani Railway Station is the main station of the province. It is in Phunphin, about 15 kilometres (9.3 mi) from Surat Thani.

=== Road ===
Surat Thani is connected to Nakhon Si Thammarat by Route 401. Asian highway AH2 also passes the city at Phunphin.

=== Air ===
Surat Thani International Airport is about 30 km (19 mi) from the city by road.

=== Water ===
There are three main ferry companies that operate from mainland Surat Thani to the islands: Lomprayah, Seatran, and Raja.

There are only two ferry piers in Muang Surat Thani: Tapee Pier, which Lomprayah's High Speed Catarman operates from, and Bandon Pier, which is for night boats only. Seatran Pier and Raja Pier are both located in Don Sak District, 65km (40mi) east of the city centre.

== Climate ==
Surat Thani has a tropical monsoon climate (Köppen climate classification Aw). Like other parts of Southern Thailand, Surat Thani has only two seasons; wet and dry. Temperatures are fairly stable throughout the year, although the pre-monsoon months (March–May) are somewhat hotter. There is a short dry season from January to April, followed by the wet season that lasts from May to December. The heaviest rains occur in October and November.

Climate data for Surat Thani (1991–2020, extremes 1960-present)
Month	Jan	Feb	Mar	Apr	May	Jun	Jul	Aug	Sep	Oct	Nov	Dec	Year
Record high °C (°F)	35.0 (95.0)	37.6 (99.7)	39.0 (102.2)	41.0 (105.8)	40.0 (104.0)	39.5 (103.1)	37.5 (99.5)	36.6 (97.9)	36.5 (97.7)	36.0 (96.8)	36.3 (97.3)	35.0 (95.0)	41.0 (105.8)
Mean daily maximum °C (°F)	31.0 (87.8)	32.7 (90.9)	34.5 (94.1)	35.4 (95.7)	34.5 (94.1)	33.6 (92.5)	33.3 (91.9)	33.3 (91.9)	32.9 (91.2)	32.1 (89.8)	30.8 (87.4)	30.1 (86.2)	32.9 (91.1)
Daily mean °C (°F)	26.0 (78.8)	26.7 (80.1)	27.8 (82.0)	28.6 (83.5)	28.1 (82.6)	27.7 (81.9)	27.3 (81.1)	27.3 (81.1)	27.0 (80.6)	26.7 (80.1)	26.3 (79.3)	25.8 (78.4)	27.1 (80.8)
Mean daily minimum °C (°F)	22.1 (71.8)	21.8 (71.2)	22.8 (73.0)	23.9 (75.0)	24.3 (75.7)	23.9 (75.0)	23.7 (74.7)	23.6 (74.5)	23.6 (74.5)	23.6 (74.5)	23.4 (74.1)	22.7 (72.9)	23.3 (73.9)
Record low °C (°F)	12.4 (54.3)	14.2 (57.6)	17.0 (62.6)	20.0 (68.0)	20.7 (69.3)	20.5 (68.9)	20.5 (68.9)	20.2 (68.4)	19.7 (67.5)	19.5 (67.1)	16.3 (61.3)	16.6 (61.9)	12.4 (54.3)
Average precipitation mm (inches)	75.0 (2.95)	24.1 (0.95)	84.0 (3.31)	73.3 (2.89)	151.2 (5.95)	133.4 (5.25)	134.4 (5.29)	127.3 (5.01)	171.9 (6.77)	202.3 (7.96)	254.8 (10.03)	170.3 (6.70)	1,602 (63.1)
Average precipitation days (≥ 1.0 mm)	5.4	1.9	4.2	5.9	13.1	12.3	13.2	12.4	14.3	15.8	13.8	10.5	122.8
Average relative humidity (%)	83.2	79.0	77.5	78.4	82.5	82.6	83.0	82.9	84.5	86.6	87.5	86.0	82.8
Mean monthly sunshine hours	198.4	214.7	201.5	183.0	155.0	114.0	114.7	114.7	108.0	108.5	138.0	176.7	1,827.2
Mean daily sunshine hours	6.4	7.6	6.5	6.1	5.0	3.8	3.7	3.7	3.6	3.5	4.6	5.7	5.0
Source 1: World Meteorological Organization
Source 2: Office of Water Management and Hydrology, Royal Irrigation Department (sun 1981–2010)(extremes)

== Culture ==
=== Festivals ===
- Chak Phra - Celebrating Buddha's symbolic return to earth at the end of Buddhist Lent. Parade, floats and long-boat races.
- Tham Bun Dern Sip (ทำบุญเดือนสิบ) - Southern Thai Festival of the Tenth Lunar Month
- Surat Food Fair – Held annually in March (2019 dates: 8-16 March) along the Tapi River. The largest food festival in Southern Thailand.
- Surat Thani Vegetarian Festival - Held annually in October (2018 dates: 8-15 October). Parades, more vegetarian options in restaurants and shops, and free food at the Chinese temples
- Songkran - Thai New Year Festival
- Loi Krathong -

=== Sports ===
Surat Thani is home to the Surat Thani Football Club (nicknamed “Police Tero”, previously known as “The Roosters”) and the Surat Thani Futsal Club (nicknamed “The Chargers”).

== Education ==
=== Colleges and universities ===
- Prince of Songkla University (PSU), Surat Thani Campus
- Surat Thani Rajabhat University (SRU)
- Tapee University
- Suratthani Technical College
- Surat Thani Vocational Education College
- Surat Commercial Technology College
- Surat Thani Polytechnic College

=== Primary and secondary ===
Primary and secondary schools with English instruction include:

- Surat Thani International School (STIS)
- Oonrak International Bilingual School
- Joy Bilingual School
- Sarasas Witaed Suratthani School

=== Secondary ===
- Suratthani School

== Hospitals ==
- Ministry of Public Health
  - Surat Thani Hospital - public hospital
  - Suan Saranrom Hospital - psychiatric hospital
  - Suratthani Cancer Hospital - cancer hospital
- Military
  - Fort Wiphavadirangsit Hospital - military hospital
  - Wing 7 Hospital - Wing 7 Royal Thai Air Force
- Private
  - Bangkok Hospital Surat - private hospital
  - Thaksin Hospital - private hospital

== Administration ==
Subdistrict	Villages	Community	People	Households
Makham Tia	6	-	73,626	42,602
Bang Kung	5	-	28,219	14,317
Talat	1	-	26,405	15,902
Bang Bai Mai	2	-	1,495	1,095
Bang Chan	1	-	1,284	355
Khlong Chanak	3	-	1,011	277

The administration of Surat Thani city municipality is responsible for an area that covers 68.97 square kilometers (26.63 square miles) and consists of six subdistricts, 18 villages (muban), 132,040 people in 74,548 households.

== Notable people ==
- Phukphong Phongpetra, police officer.
- Panipak Wongpattanakit, taekwondo athlete.
