= Faculty of Medicine, Thammasat University =

Medical school in Thailand

- คณะแพทยศาสตร์ มหาวิทยาลัยธรรมศาสตร์
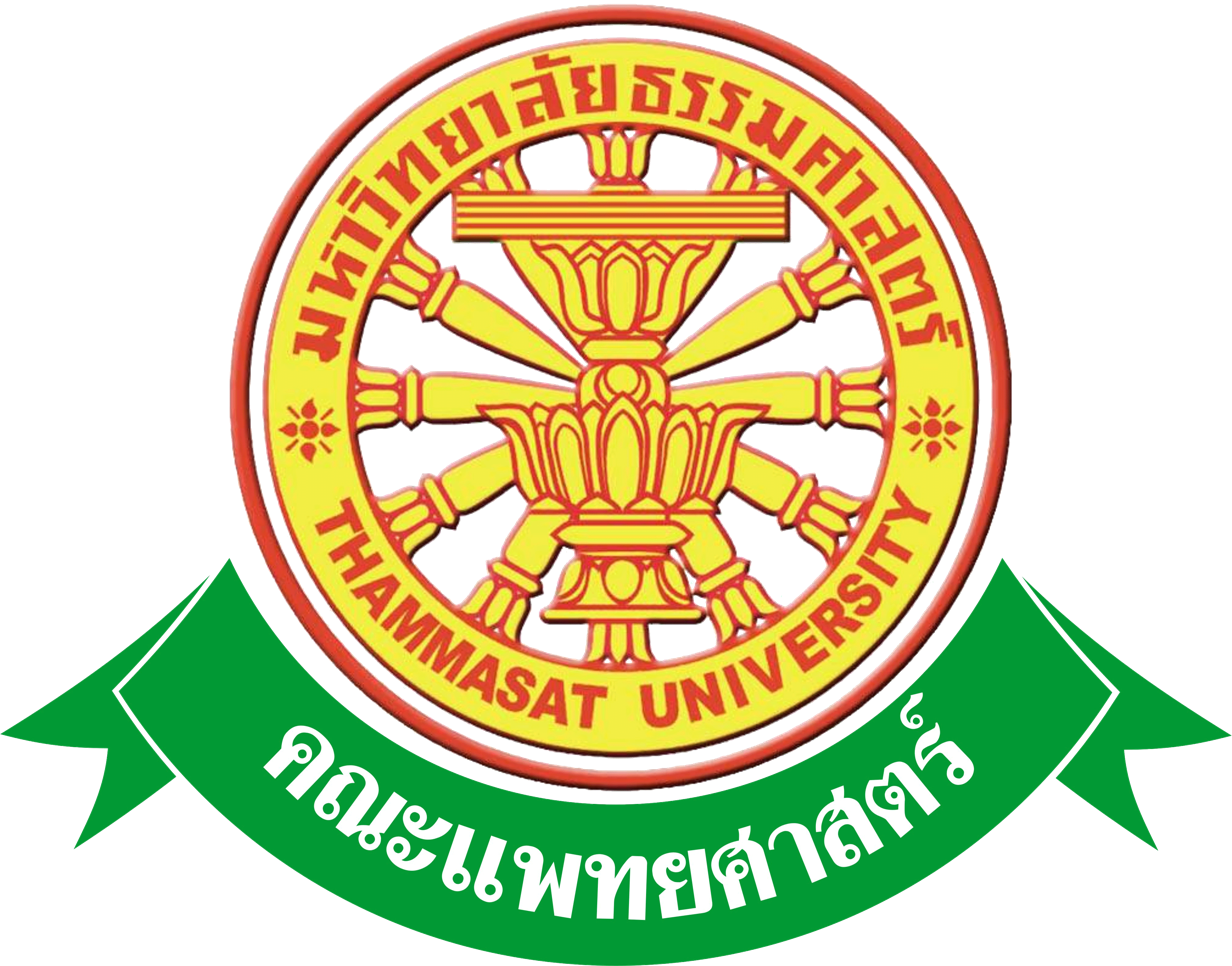
- Type: Public (non-profit)
- Established: 19 March 1990
- Parent institution: Thammasat University
- Dean: Assoc. Prof. Dilok Piyayotai, M.D.
- Location: Khlong Nueng Subdistrict, Khlong Luang District, Pathum Thani, Thailand
- Colors: Green
- Website: http://med.tu.ac.th/webmed/

The Faculty of Medicine, Thammasat University (Thai: คณะแพทยศาสตร์ มหาวิทยาลัยธรรมศาสตร์) is a medical school in Thailand in Khlong Luang District, Pathum Thani Province. It is the eleventh faculty of Thammasat University and ninth medical school set up in Thailand.

== History ==
Thammasat University laid plans to build a faculty to teach medicine in 1979. The project was initiated in 1986 when the construction of Thammasat University Hospital was started. The council of the university then approved the construction of a Faculty of Medicine in August 1988, followed by cabinet approval on 30 January 1990 and finally by royal decree of King Bhumibol Adulyadej on 19 March 1990.

In the 2018 academic year, Thammasat accepted a total of 170 students for the MD course, separated into 105 students under the Collaborative Project to Increase Production of Rural Doctor (CPIRD) and 65 students under the Consortium of Thai Medical Schools Examination (กสพท). In the same year, the faculty also accepted 30 students for the BSc. Applied Thai Traditional Medicine course.

== Departments ==
- Preclinical Science
  - Department of Anatomy
  - Department of Physiology
  - Department of Parasitology
  - Department of Pharmacology
  - Department of Microbiology and Immunity
  - Department of Biochemistry
  - Department of Cell Biology
  - Department of Molecular Genetics and Medical Molecular Biology
- Clinical Science
  - Department of Medicine
  - Department of Paediatrics
  - Department of Surgery
  - Department of Obstetrics and Gynaecology
  - Department of Orthopaedics
  - Department of Anaesthesiology
  - Department of Otolaryngology
  - Department of Rehabilitation Medicine
  - Department of Emergency Medicine
  - Department of Radiology
  - Department of Ophthalmology
  - Department of Pathology and Forensic Science
  - Department of Psychiatry
  - Department of Epidemiology
- Community Medicine and Family Medicine Center
- Graduate School
  - Biochemistry and Molecular Biology
- Applied Thai Traditional Medicine Center

== Teaching hospitals ==
- Thammasat University Hospital
- Saraburi Hospital (CPIRD)
- Chumphon Khet Udomsakdi Hospital (Thai: โรงพยาบาลชุมพรเขตอุดมศักดิ์, RTGS: rong phayaban chumphon khet udom sak) (CPIRD)
- Surat Thani Hospital (CPIRD)
- Buddhasothorn Hospital (CPIRD)

== See also ==
- List of medical schools in Thailand
