= Chulabhorn International College of Medicine =

Medical school in Thailand

Chulabhorn International College of Medicine, Thammasat University
- วิทยาลัยแพทยศาสตร์นานาชาติจุฬาภรณ์ มหาวิทยาลัยธรรมศาสตร์
- Type: Public (non-profit)
- Established: 28 August 2012
- Parent institution: Thammasat University
- Dean: Asst. Prof. Peerapong Kitipawong, M.D.
- Location: 95 Phahonyothin Road, Khlong Luang District, Pathum Thani 12120, Thailand
- Website: http://www.cicm.tu.ac.th/index.php

The Chulabhorn International College of Medicine, Thammasat University or CICM (Thai: วิทยาลัยแพทยศาสตร์นานาชาติจุฬาภรณ์ มหาวิทยาลัยธรรมศาสตร์) is the twenty-first medical school set up in Thailand located in Khlong Luang District, Pathum Thani Province, and is the first institution in Thailand to provide an international course in medicine. The first year course consists of general sciences, followed by preclinical years 2 and 3 and then the clinical years 4–6. During the clinical years, Thammasat University Hospital is used as the main training site and students may undertake electives in foreign countries.

CICM was opened on 28 August 2012 to provide medical education in English as an international course. The college aims to produce high-quality graduates in medicine and health sciences according to international standards.

Its undergraduate programs include:

1. Doctor of Medicine (International Program)

2. Doctor of Medicine (English Program)

3. Doctor of Dental Surgery (Bilingual Program)

4. Cardiovascular and Thoracic Technology (International Program)

5. Traditional Chinese Medicine (International Program)

6. Doctor of Optometry (International Program)

Graduate programs include:

1. Integrative Medicine (International Program)

2. Translational Bioclinical Sciences and Innovation (International Program)

3. Dermatology (International Program)

4. Social Gerontology (International Program)

5. Bioinnovation and Entrepreneurship (International Program)

The courses focus on Problem-Based Learning (PBL) and Team-Based Learning (TBL) to help students think critically and work well in teams. CICM also promotes innovative research and collaborates with leading universities and institutions in Thailand and abroad.

== Teaching Hospitals ==
- Thammasat University Hospital
- King Narai Hospital, Lopburi province
- Rayong Hospital, Rayong province
