= Faculty of Medicine, Srinakharinwirot University =

- คณะแพทยศาสตร์ มหาวิทยาลัยศรีนครินทรวิโรฒ
- Type: Public (non-profit)
- Established: 13 June 1985 (39 years ago)
- Parent institution: Srinakharinwirot University
- Dean: Assoc Prof Phairoj Chongbanyatcharoen, M.D.
- Location: Prasarnmit Campus Building 15 Faculty of Medicine, 114 Soi Sukhumvit 23 Khlong Toei Nuea Subdistrict, Watthana District, Bangkok 10110, Thailand; Ongkharak Campus 62 Mu 7, Ongkharak Subdistrict, Ongkharak District, Nakhon Nayok 26120, Thailand
- Colours: Dark green
- Website: med.swu.ac.th

The Faculty of Medicine, Srinakharinwirot University (Thai: คณะแพทยศาสตร์ มหาวิทยาลัยศรีนครินทรวิโรฒ; abbr: MED SWU) is the medical school of Srinakharinwirot University, a public university in Bangkok, Thailand. It was founded in 1985, making it the eighth oldest medical school in Thailand. The school has two campuses: Prasarnmit Campus in Watthana, Bangkok and Ongkharak Campus in Ongkharak District, Nakhon Nayok Province.

== History ==
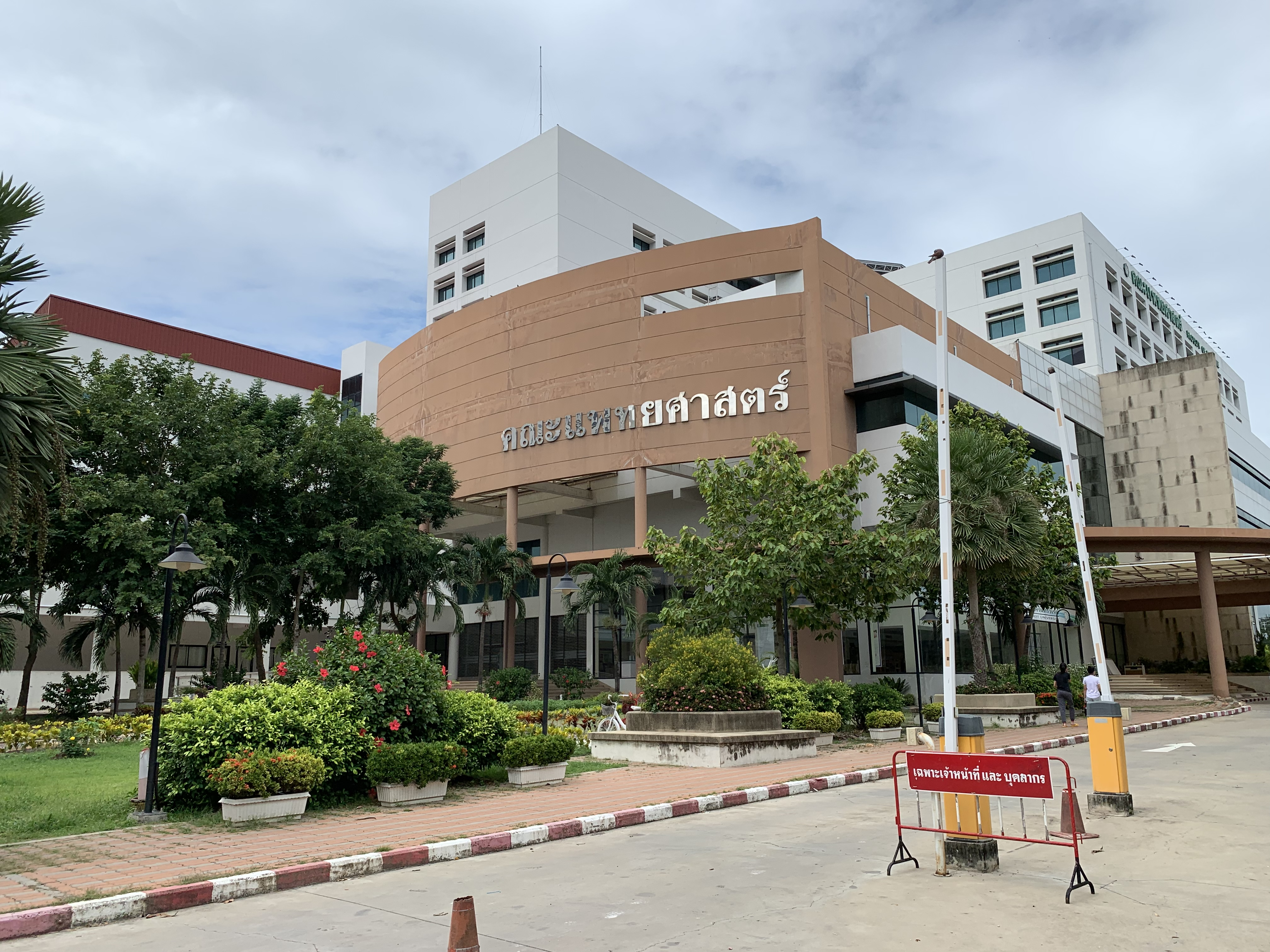
Faculty building at Ongkharak Campus

The project to set up the Faculty of Medicine, Srinakharinwirot University was planned since 1980 under the prime ministership of Prem Tinsulanonda and the faculty was officially set up on 13 June 1985, in a partnership with Bangkok Metropolitan Administration. In its early years, Vajira Hospital was used as the main clinical teaching site (Years 4-6), as well as a number of hospitals operating under governmental organisations, such as the Police General Hospital. In 1992, the university saw fit to expand to have a hospital of its own, so the HRH Princess Maha Chakri Sirindhorn Medical Center was constructed at Ongkharak and was completed in 1999. Currently, clinical year students rotate around the HRH Princess Maha Chakri Sirindhorn Medical Center and Panyananthaphikkhu Chonprathan Medical Center as main teaching hospitals, as well as affiliated hospitals.

The faculty also holds an academic partnership with the University of Nottingham Medical School and holds a Joint Medical Programme with the university. Students will study at the University of Nottingham at the United Kingdom in the preclinical years (Year 1-3), before returning to study in Thailand in the clinical years.

A total of 200 medical students are annually accepted at the Faculty of Medicine, Srinakharinwirot University in the 2018 academic year. 180 students are accepted via the Consortium of Thai Medical Schools Examination (กสพท) and study the whole MD course in Thailand, while 20 students are accepted into the Joint Medical Programme through BMAT Test and study half of the time in the United Kingdom and the other half in Thailand.

== Main Teaching Hospitals ==
- HRH Princess Maha Chakri Sirindhorn Medical Centre, Nakhon Nayok
- Panyananthaphikkhu Chonprathan Medical Center, Nonthaburi

== Affiliated Teaching Hospitals ==
- Vajira Hospital, Bangkok
- Police General Hospital, Bangkok
- Lerdsin Hospital, Bangkok
- Nopparat Rajathanee Hospital, Bangkok
- Samut Prakan Hospital, Samut Prakan
- King Narai Hospital, Lopburi
- Nakhon Nayok Hospital, Nakhon Nayok
- Pathum Thani Hospital, Pathum Thani
- Maha Vajiralongkorn Cancer Center, Pathum Thani

== See also ==
- List of medical schools in Thailand
