= Thammasat University Hospital =

Thammasat University Hospital โรงพยาบาลธรรมศาสตร์เฉลิมพระเกียรติ
- Office of the Rector, Thammasat University

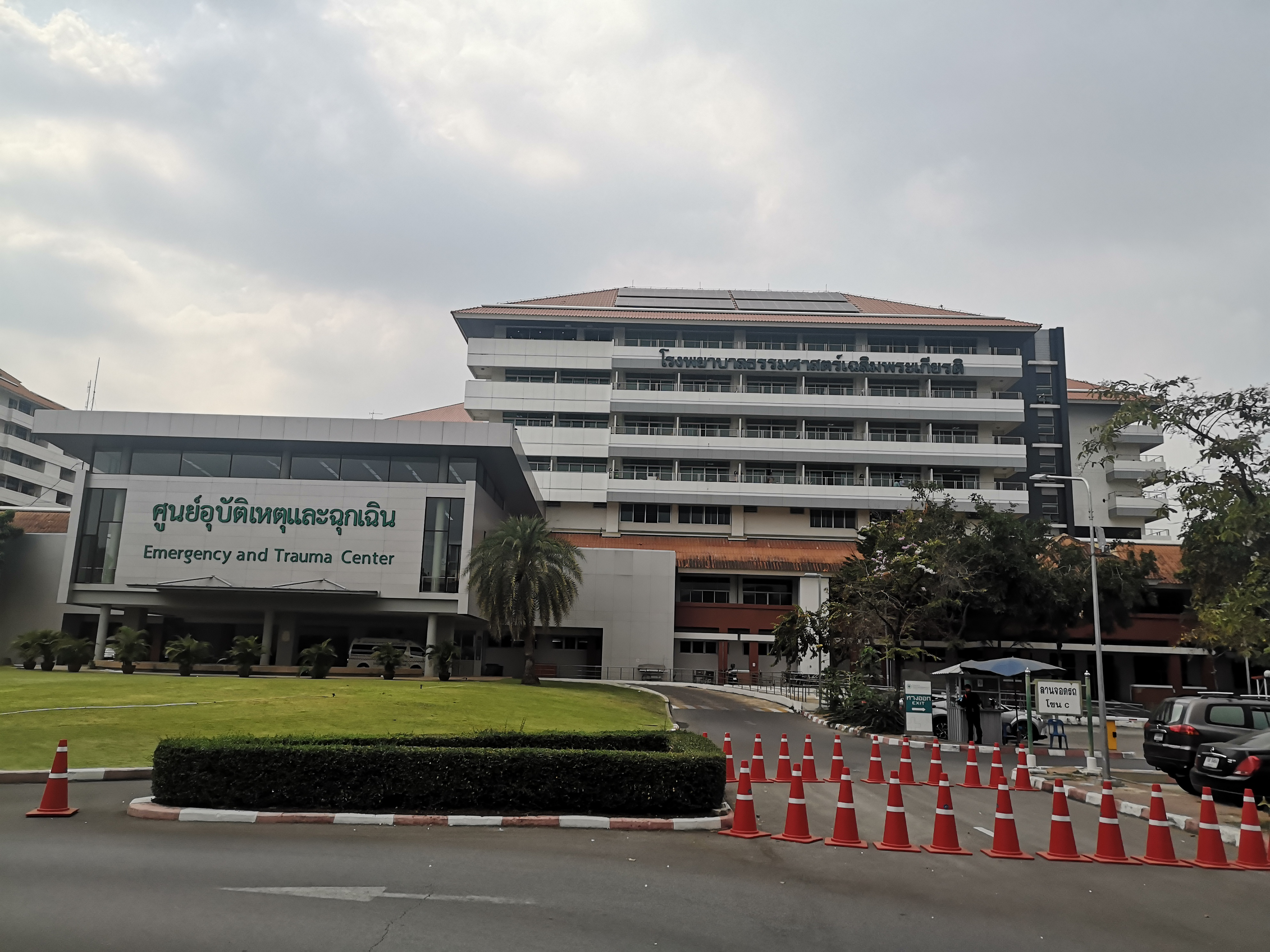

Geography
- Location: Thammasat University Rangsit Campus, No. 95, Village 8, Khlong Nueng Subdistrict, Khlong Luang, Pathum Thani, Thailand
- Coordinates: 14.07346°N 100.61561°E

Organisation
- Type: Public and teaching hospital
- Affiliated university: Faculty of Medicine, Thammasat University; Chulabhorn International College of Medicine, Thammasat University

Services
- Emergency department: Yes
- Beds: 843

History
- Opened: 29 March 1988

Links
- Website: Hospital.tu.ac.th
- Other links: List of hospitals in Thailand

Thammasat University Hospital (Thai: โรงพยาบาลธรรมศาสตร์เฉลิมพระเกียรติ; RTGS: Rong Phayaban Thammasat Chaloem Phra Kiat) is a public hospital subsidiary to the Office of the Rector, Thammasat University, Ministry of Education. It is located in the Rangsit Campus, Pathum Thani Province, Thailand.

The construction of the hospital complex began in 1986 and King Bhumibol Adulyadej presided over the ceremony of laying the foundation stone of the main building on 3 November of that year. The hospital commenced its operation on 5 December 1987, on which the king turned 60 years of age. However, the hospital was formally opened on 29 March 1988. On 19 March 1990, a royal decree was issued to establish a Faculty of Medicine in Thammasat University and the royal decree took effect as from the following day. On 10 April 1990, the hospital formally became a subsidiary of the Faculty of Medicine. On 19 February 2003, the hospital was transferred to the Office of the Rector.

Apart from providing medical services to the general public, the hospital serves as a teaching hospital for the Faculty of Allied Health Science, Faculty of Dentistry, Faculty of Medicine, Faculty of Nursing and Faculty of Public Health. At present, it provides every type of medical services, receives at least 1,500 outpatients a day and has 844 beds for inpatients.

The current director of the hospital is Associate Professor Chittinad Havanond (จิตตินัดด์ หะวานนท์) who has taken the office since 2014.
