= HRH Princess Maha Chakri Sirindhorn Medical Center =

Coordinates: 14.111532°N 100.984891°E

HRH Princess Maha Chakri Sirindhorn Medical Center ศูนย์การแพทย์สมเด็จพระเทพรัตนราชสุดาฯ สยามบรมราชกุมารี

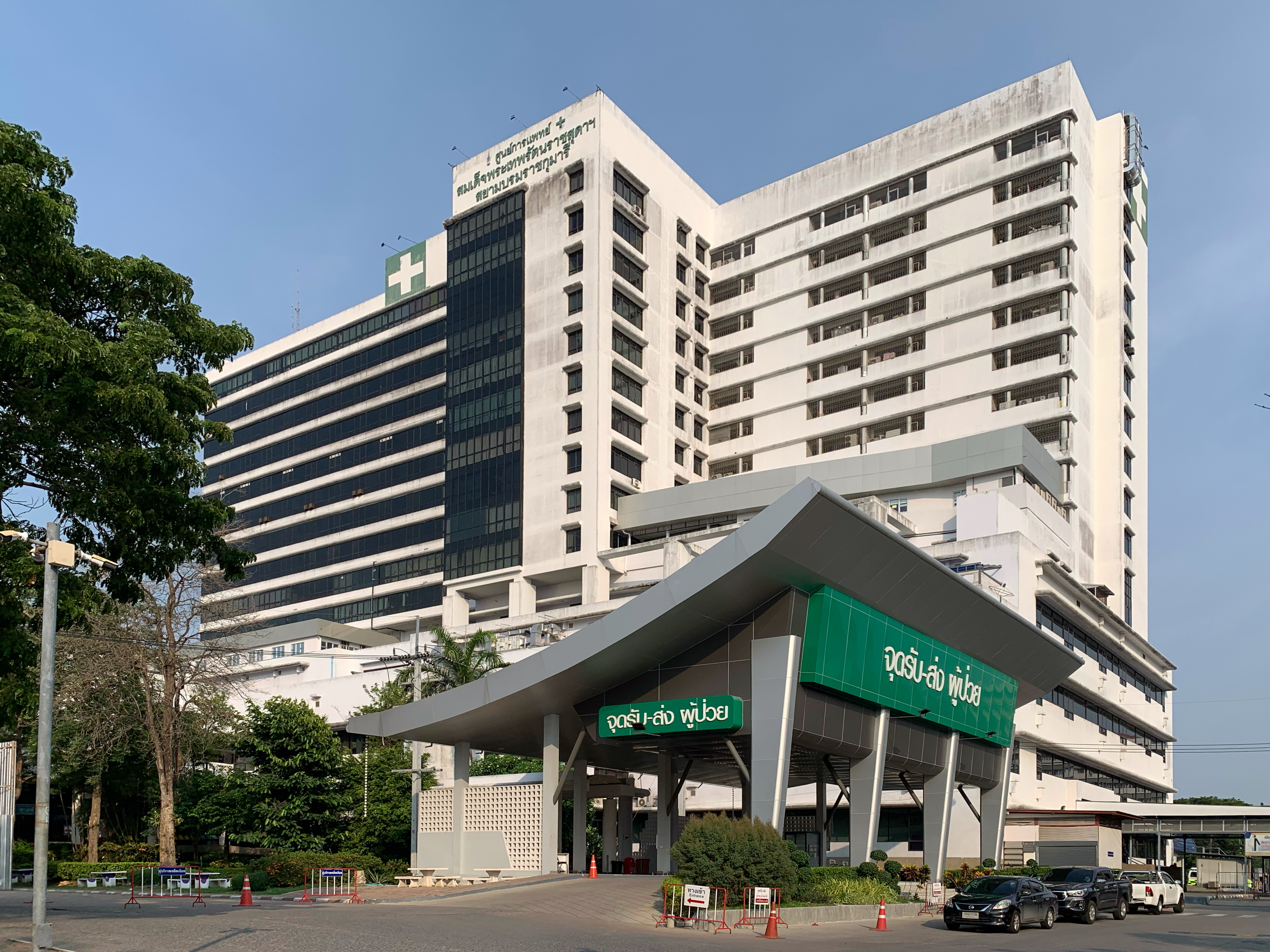

Geography
- Location: Rangsit-Nakhon Nayok Road, Ongkharak Subdistrict, Ongkharak District, Nakhon Nayok Province, Thailand

Organisation
- Type: Teaching
- Affiliated university: Faculty of Medicine, Srinakharinwirot University

Services
- Beds: 433

History
- Opened: 2 October 2000; 24 years ago

Links
- Website: medicine.swu.ac.th
- Lists: Hospitals in Thailand

HRH Princess Maha Chakri Sirindhorn Medical Center (Thai: ศูนย์การแพทย์สมเด็จพระเทพรัตนราชสุดาฯ สยามบรมราชกุมารี), abbreviated MSMC Hospital, is a teaching hospital located inside of Srinakharinwirot University Ongkharak Campus, Nakhon Nayok Province, Thailand. The hospital serves as a teaching hospital for the Faculty of Medicine, Faculty of Nursing, and Faculty of Physical Therapy of Srinakharinwirot University. It is one of the two teaching hospitals of Srinakharinwirot University, the other being the Panyananthaphikkhu Chonprathan Medical Center in Nonthaburi Province.

== History ==
Constructed in 1992 and finished in 1998, the HRH Princess Maha Chakri Sirindhorn Medical Center opened its doors officially in 2000, with HRH Princess Sirindhorn herself conducted the opening ceremony on November 2, 2000. The hospital's main aim is to serve as the major teaching hospital for both the Faculty of Medicine and other health science-related faculties of Srinakharinwirot University. Moreover, the hospital mainly serves 4 other nearby provinces in addition to Nakhon Nayok Province: Prachinburi Province, Sa Kaeo Province, Chachoengsao Province, Rayong Province, and Chonburi Province.

== Medical services ==
The hospital consists of 378 beds, with the total area of 58,595 square meter. As of 2019, the hospital has 11 medical specialty departments.

== See also ==
- Srinakharinwirot University
- Faculty of Medicine, Srinakharinwirot University
- Hospitals in Thailand
