= Metropolitan Police Bureau =

Bangkok, Thailand law enforcement agency

Metropolitan Police Bureau กองบัญชาการตำรวจนครบาล
- Official Seal
- Abbreviation: MPB

Agency overview
- Formed: 1862; 164 years ago

Jurisdictional structure
- National agency (Operations jurisdiction): Thailand
- Operations jurisdiction: Bangkok, Thailand
- Areas of responsibility of various metropolitan police stations
- Area: 503 sq mi (1,300 km^{2})
- Population: 8.281 million
- Legal jurisdiction: Bangkok, Thailand
- General nature: Local civilian police

Operational structure
- Headquarters: Royal Thai Police Headquarters, Pathum Wan, Bangkok, Thailand
- Agency executive: Police Lieutenant General Thiti Saengsawang, Commissioner
- Parent agency: Royal Thai Police

Facilities
- Patrol cars: 6,000

Website
- metro.police.go.th

The Metropolitan Police Bureau (Thai: กองบัญชาการตำรวจนครบาล) is a unit in the Royal Thai Police, and is responsible for maintaining security in Bangkok - the capital of Thailand. There are a total of 14 divisions (command units) and 2 direct divisions which report directly to the Commissioner of the Metropolitan Police Bureau. The current and 52nd Commissioner of the Metropolitan Police Bureau is Police Lieutenant General Thiti Saengsawang.

== History ==
In 1862, King Mongkut appointed British Captain Samuel Joseph Bird Ames to set up a police force in Bangkok for the first time by adopting a model from the British police.

In 1892, King Chulalongkorn appointed Prince Damrong Rajanubhab as Interior Minister with responsibility over provincial policing, including a department in Bangkok. While Prince Naresr Varariddhi the Capital city minister was given responsibility over the city's urban police force, then called the 'patrol police' (พลตระเวน).

On 13 October 1915, both of Bangkok's police departments were merged by order of King Vajiravudh. A single director was appointed to oversee both the police and patrol forces.

In 1922 the Phraya Atikorn Prajak (Louis Chatikavanij) was appointed Director-General to the reformed and renamed Metropolitan Police Bureau.

Due to the economic crisis gripping the country after the Great Depression and after the Siamese revolution of 1932, the force was disbanded and only the bureau headquarters was retained.

On 24 August 1948 a royal command re-established the Metropolitan Police Bureau as a police force, in line with the re-organisation of other police forces under the Ministry of the Interior.

Since 1961 the Bureau had its offices adjacent to the Phan Fa Lilat Bridge, however on the 14 October 1973 a student uprising led to the destruction and burning of these offices. The bureau then relocated to the offices of the Fire department of Phaya Thai District.

On 14 October 1992 Princess Maha Chakri Sirindhorn came to unveil a monument to Prince Naresr Varariddhi and the new Metropolitan Police Headquarters at Paruskavan Palace, Dusit District, which is the current home of the bureau.

== Affiliated agencies ==
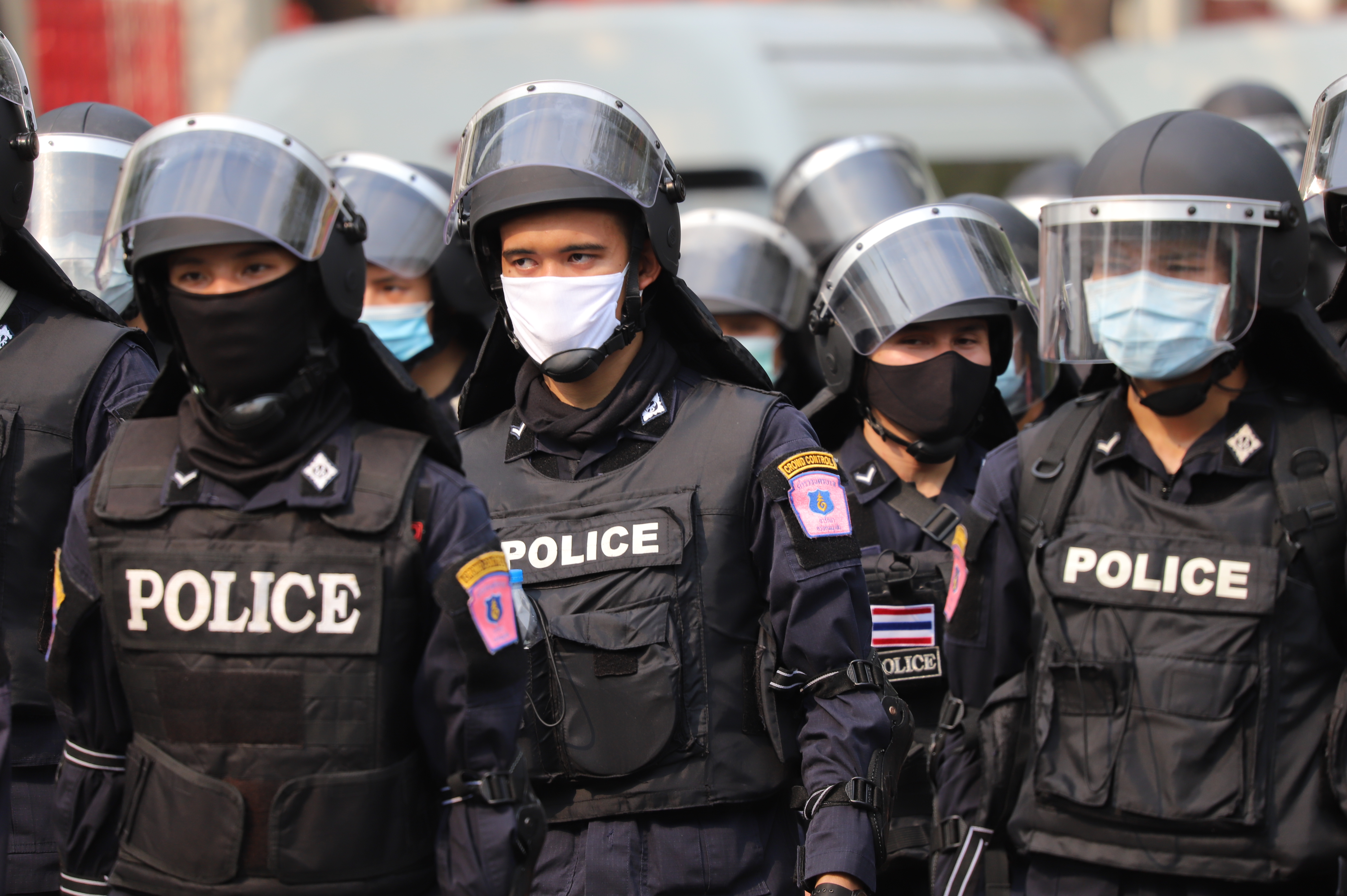
Riot Police from Protection and Crowds Control Division (PCCD) take the area at front of UN Building from Myanmar protesters in event against the military coup and free Aung San Suu Kyi

- Administrative Division
- Metropolitan Police Bureau Division 1 (MPB 1)
  - Investigation Sub-Division
  - Dusit Metropolitan Police Station
  - Samsen Metropolitan Police Station
  - Nang Leang Metropolitan Police Station
  - Chana Songkhram Metropolitan Police Station
  - Phyathai Metropolitan Police Station
  - Makkasan Metropolitan Police Station
  - Din Daeng Metropolitan Police Station
  - Huai Khwang Metropolitan Police Station
  - Bangpo Metropolitan Police Station
- Metropolitan Police Bureau Division 2 (MPB 2)
  - Investigation Sub-Division
  - Taopoon Metropolitan Police Station
  - Kannayao Metropolitan Police Station
  - Bang Sue Metropolitan Police Station
  - Don Mueang Metropolitan Police Station
  - Khokkram Metropolitan Police Station
  - Prachachuen Metropolitan Police Station
  - Bang Khen Metropolitan Police Station
  - Sai Mai Metropolitan Police Station
  - Phahonyothin Metropolitan Police Station
  - Tungsonghong Metropolitan Police Station
  - Sutthisan Metropolitan Police Station
- Metropolitan Police Bureau Division 3 (MPB 3)
  - Investigation Sub-Division
  - Chorakaenoi Metropolitan Police Station
  - Chalong Krung Metropolitan Police Station
  - Nimit Mai Metropolitan Police Station
  - Prachasumran Metropolitan Police Station
  - Minburi Metropolitan Police Station
  - Romklao Metropolitan Police Station
  - Ladkrabang Metropolitan Police Station
  - Lumpakchee Metropolitan Police Station
  - Lamhin Metropolitan Police Station
  - Suwinthawong Metropolitan Police Station
  - Nongchok Metropolitan Police Station
- Metropolitan Police Bureau Division 4 (MPB 4)
  - Investigation Sub-Division
  - Hua Mak Metropolitan Police Station
  - Ladparo Metropolitan Police Station
  - Wang Thong Lang Metropolitan Police Station
  - Chockchai Metropolitan Police Station
  - Buengkum Metropolitan Police Station
  - Bangchan Metropolitan Police Station
  - Prawet Metropolitan Police Station
  - Udomsuk Metropolitan Police Station
- Metropolitan Police Bureau Division 5 (MPB 5)
  - Investigation Sub-Division
  - Watphrayakhrai Metropolitan Police Station
  - Bang Phong Pang Metropolitan Police Station
  - Tungmahamek Metropolitan Police Station
  - Lumpini Metropolitan Police Station
  - Thonglor Metropolitan Police Station
  - klongton Metropolitan Police Station
  - Phra Khanong Metropolitan Police Station
  - Bang Na Metropolitan Police Station
  - Tharuea Metropolitan Police Station
- Metropolitan Police Bureau Division 6 (MPB 6)
  - Investigation Sub-Division
  - Pathum Wan Metropolitan Police Station
  - Samranrat Metropolitan Police Station
  - Phrarachawang Metropolitan Police Station
  - Chakrawat Metropolitan Police Station
  - Phlapphla Chai 1 Metropolitan Police Station
  - Phlapphla Chai 2 Metropolitan Police Station
  - Bang Rak Metropolitan Police Station
  - Yan Nawa Metropolitan Police Station
- Metropolitan Police Bureau Division 7 (MPB 7)
  - Investigation Sub-Division
  - Bangplad Metropolitan Police Station
  - Bangyikhan Metropolitan Police Station
  - Taling Chan Metropolitan Police Station
  - Bangkhunnon Metropolitan Police Station
  - Bangkoknoi Metropolitan Police Station
  - Bangkokyai Metropolitan Police Station
  - Bangsaothong Metropolitan Police Station
  - Thapra Metropolitan Police Station
  - Thammasala Metropolitan Police Station
  - Saladang Metropolitan Police Station
  - BorwornMongkol Metropolitan Police Station
- Metropolitan Police Bureau Division 8 (MPB 8)
  - Investigation Sub-Division
  - Bang Yi Ruea Metropolitan Police Station
  - Somdejchaopraya Metropolitan Police Station
- Metropolitan Police Bureau Division 9 (MPB 9)
  - Investigation Sub-Division
- Traffic Police Division
- Special Operations Division
- Patrol and Special operation Division (191 Special Branch police)
- Protection and Crowd Control Division (PCCD)
- Welfare of Children and Women Division
- Metropolitan Police Bureau Training Division
