= Healthcare in Thailand =

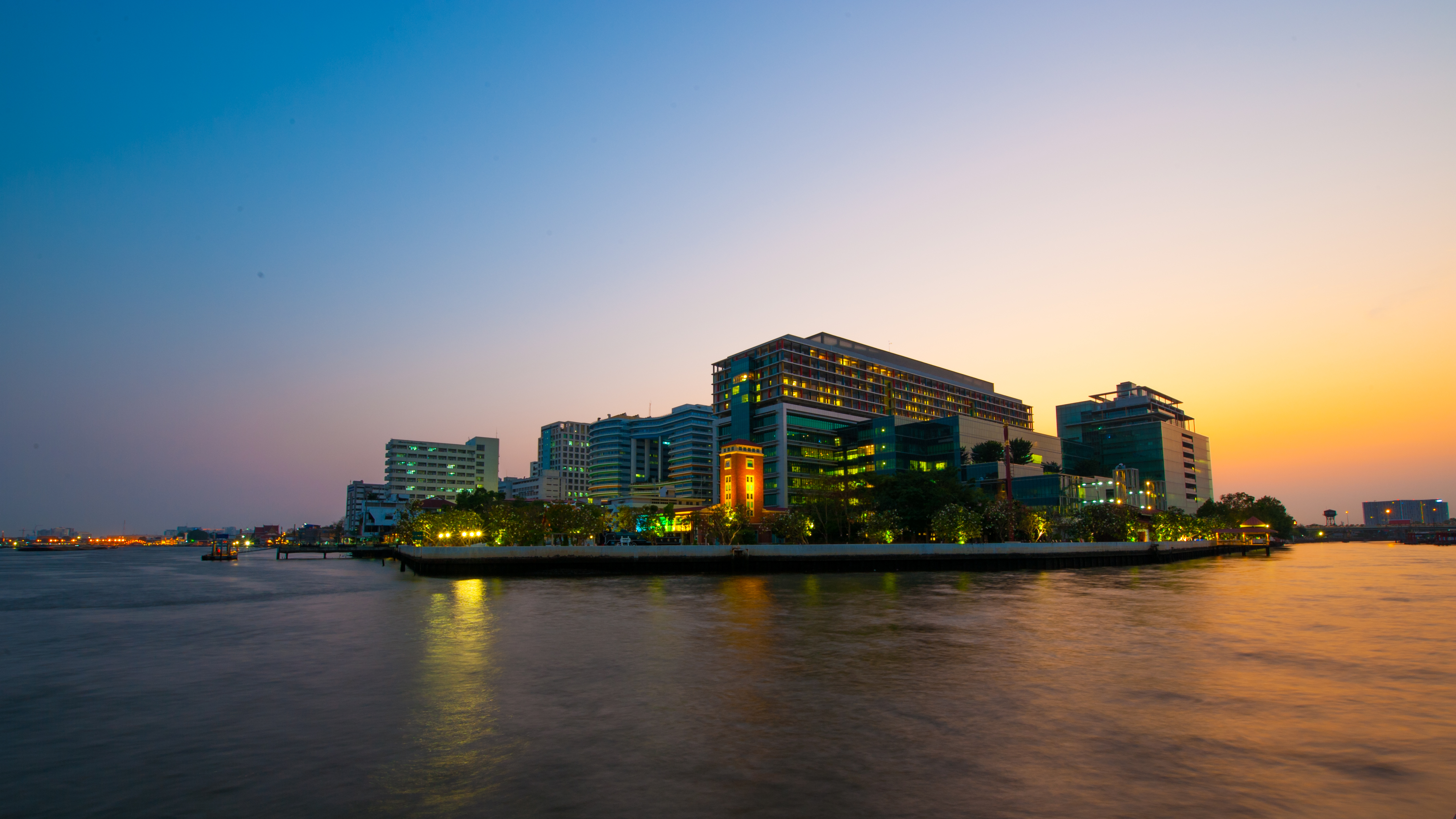
Siriraj Hospital, Bangkok, the oldest and largest hospital in Thailand, also the teaching hospital of the first medical college

Healthcare in Thailand is overseen by the Ministry of Public Health (MOPH), along with several other non-ministerial government agencies. Thailand's network of public hospitals provide universal healthcare to all Thai nationals through three government schemes. Private hospitals help complement the system, especially in Bangkok and large urban areas, and Thailand is among the world's leading medical tourism destinations. However, access to medical care in rural areas still lags far behind that in the cities.

== Infrastructure ==
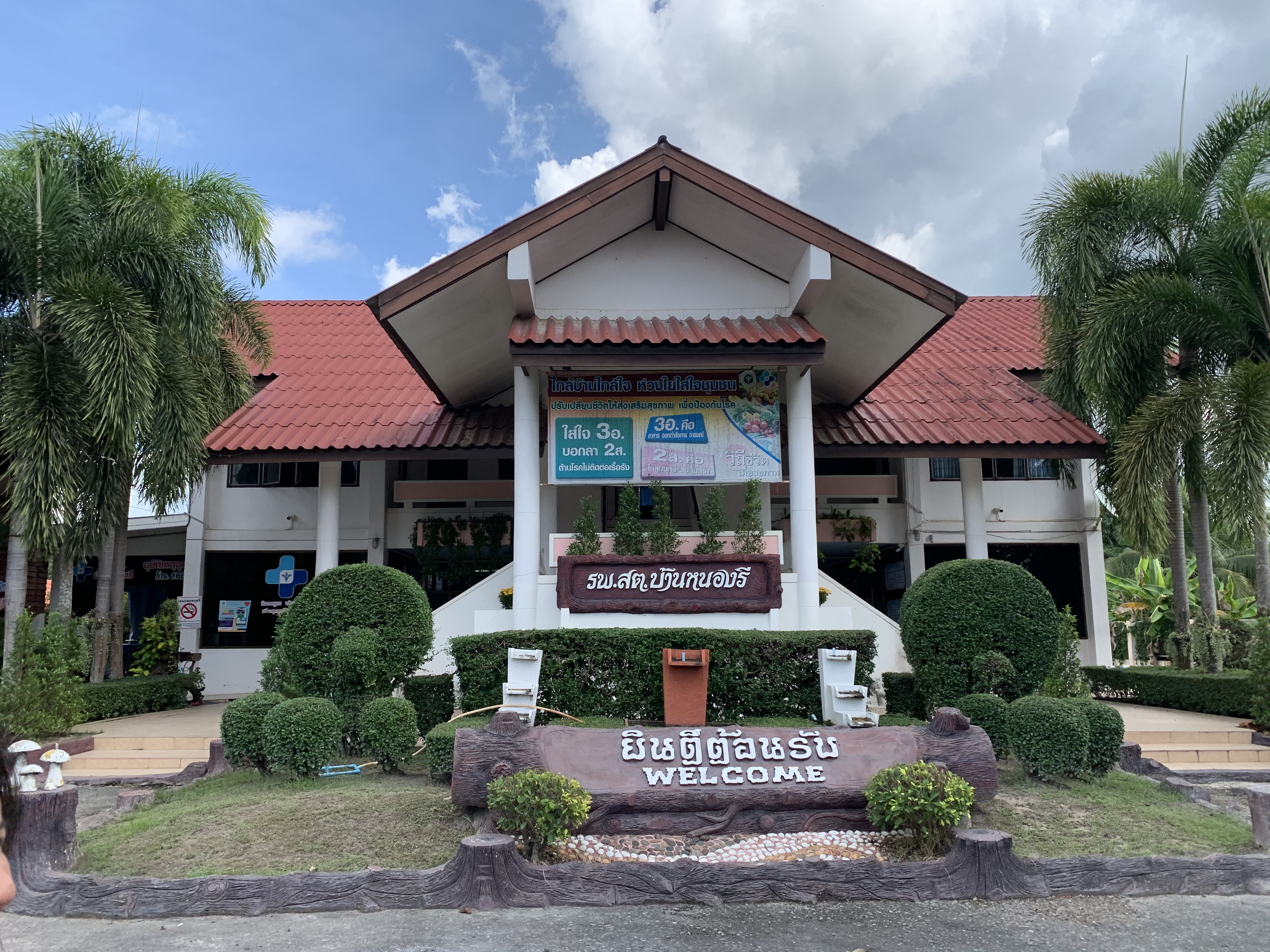
A subdistrict health promotion clinic, the most local level of healthcare infrastructure of MOPH, pictured here in Ban Na District, Nakhon Nayok Province

As of 2019, Thailand's population of 68 million is served by 927 government hospitals and 363 private hospitals with 9,768 primary care health units (SHPH clinics), responsible for Thai citizens’ health at the sub-district level. SHPH has played a significant role in the Thai public health. Additionally, there are 25,615 private clinics.

Universal health care is provided through three programs: the civil service welfare system for civil servants and their families, Social Security for private employees, and the universal coverage scheme, introduced in 2002, which is available to all other Thai nationals. Some private hospitals are participants in the programs, but most are financed by patient self-payment and private insurance. According to the World Bank, under Thailand’s health schemes, 99.5 percent of the population have health protection coverage.

The MOPH oversees national health policy and operates most government health facilities. The National Health Security Office (NHSO) allocates funding through the universal coverage program. Other health-related government agencies include the Health System Research Institute (HSRI), Thai Health Promotion Foundation ("Thai Health"), National Health Commission Office (NHCO), and the Emergency Medical Institute of Thailand (EMIT). Although there have been national policies for decentralization, resistance to implementing such changes persists, and the MOPH still directly controls most aspects of health care.

Thailand introduced universal coverage reforms in 2001, one of only a handful of lower-middle income countries to do so. Means-tested health care for low-income households was replaced by a new and more comprehensive insurance scheme, originally known as the 30 baht project, in line with the small co-payment charged for treatment. People joining the scheme receive a gold card, which allows them to access services in their health district and, if necessary, to be referred for specialist treatment elsewhere.

The bulk of health financing comes from public revenues, with funding allocated to contracting units for primary care annually on a population basis. According to the WHO, 65 percent of Thailand's health care expenditure in 2004 came from the government, while 35 percent was from private sources. Thailand achieved universal coverage with relatively low levels of spending on health, but it faces significant challenges: rising costs, inequalities, and duplication of resources.

Although the reforms have received a good deal of criticism, they have proved popular with poorer Thais, especially in rural areas, and they survived the change of government after the 2006 military coup. Then, Public Health Minister, Mongkol Na Songkhla, abolished the 30 baht co-payment and made the scheme free. It is not yet clear whether the scheme will be modified further under the military government that came to power in May 2014.

In 2009, annual spending on health care amounted to 345 international dollars per person in purchasing power parity (PPP). Total expenditures represented about 4.3 percent of gross domestic product (GDP). Of this amount, 75.8 percent came from public sources and 24.2 percent from private sources. Physician density was 2.98 per 10,000 population in 2004, with 22 hospital beds per 100,000 population in 2002.

Data for utilization of health services in 2008 includes: 81 percent contraceptive prevalence, 80 percent ante-natal care coverage with at least four visits, 99 percent of births attended by skilled health personnel, 98 percent measles immunization coverage among one-year-olds, and 82 percent success in treatment of smear-positive tuberculosis. Improved drinking-water sources were available to 98 percent of the population, and 96 percent were using improved sanitation facilities.

=== Hospitals ===
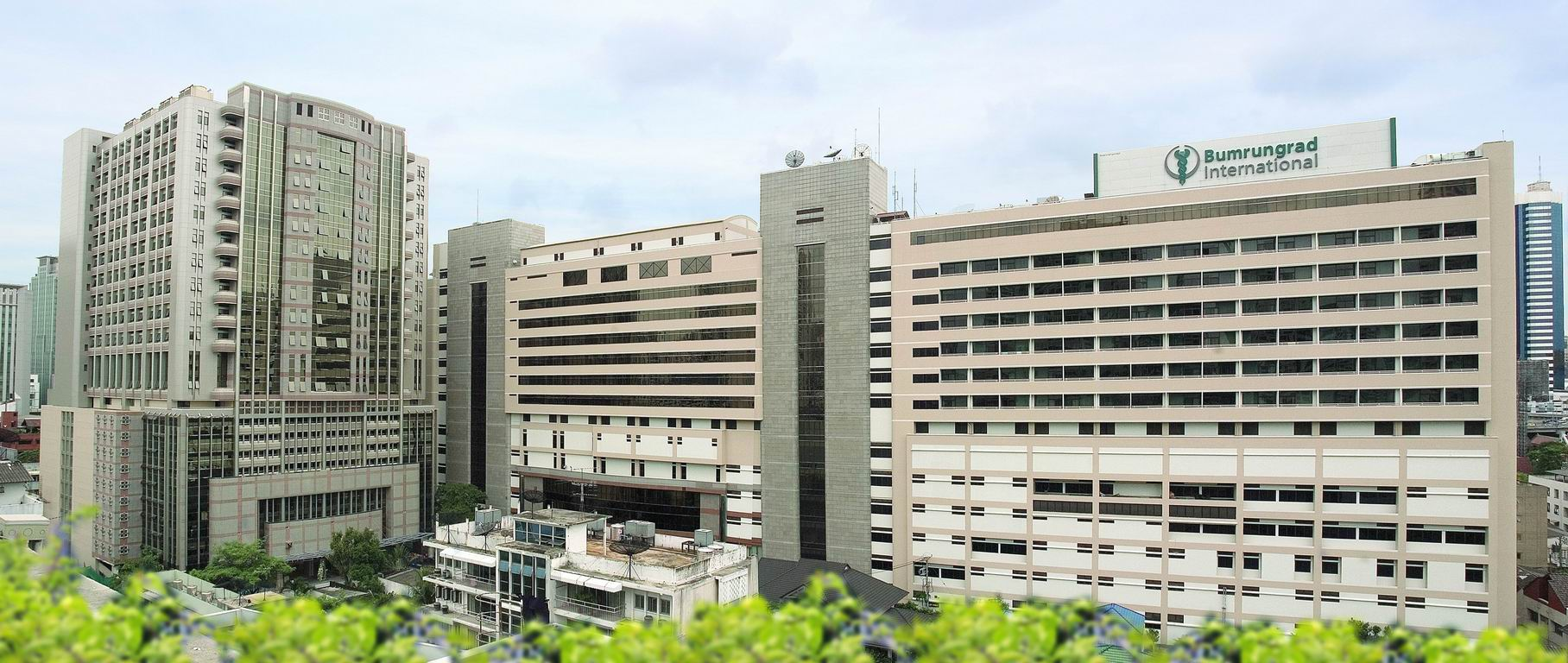
Bumrungrad International Hospital, a private hospital

Most hospitals in Thailand are operated by the Ministry of Public Health. Private hospitals are regulated by the Medical Registration Division. Other government units and public organizations also operate hospitals, including the military, universities, local governments and the Red Cross.

=== Health regions ===
Different provinces in Thailand are arranged into thirteen health regions. Each health region is responsible for about 3-6 million people living in those provinces. It aims to provide better quality medical services for citizens within that region and increased efficiency in terms of transferring patients to other hospitals if there is a lack in capability of care within that region. Health regions in Thailand are organized into the following categories, as of August 2017:

Health Regions in Thailand
Health Region Number	Provinces
1	Chiang Mai, Mae Hong Son, Lampang, Lamphun, Chiang Rai, Nan, Phayao, Phrae
2	Tak, Phitsanulok, Phetchabun, Sukhothai, Uttaradit
3	Kamphaeng Phet, Nakhon Sawan, Phichit, Uthai Thani, Chai Nat
4	Nonthaburi, Pathum Thani, Phra Nakhon Si Ayutthaya, Saraburi, Lopburi, Sing Buri, Ang Thong, Nakhon Nayok
5	Kanchanaburi, Nakhon Pathom, Ratchaburi, Suphan Buri, Prachuap Khiri Khan, Phetchaburi, Samut Songkhram, Samut Sakhon
6	Prachinburi, Sa Kaeo, Chanthaburi, Trat, Rayong, Chonburi, Samut Prakan, Chachoengsao
7	Kalasin, Khon Kaen, Maha Sarakham, Roi Et
8	Loei, Nong Khai, Nong Bua Lamphu, Udon Thani, Bueng Kan, Nakhon Phanom, Mukdahan, Sakon Nakhon
9	Chaiyaphum, Nakhon Ratchasima, Buriram, Surin
10	Yasothon, Sisaket, Amnat Charoen, Ubon Ratchathani
11	Chumphon, Surat Thani, Nakhon Si Thammarat, Ranong, Phang Nga, Phuket, Krabi
12	Phatthalung, Trang, Songkhla, Satun, Pattani, Yala, Narathiwat

=== First responders ===
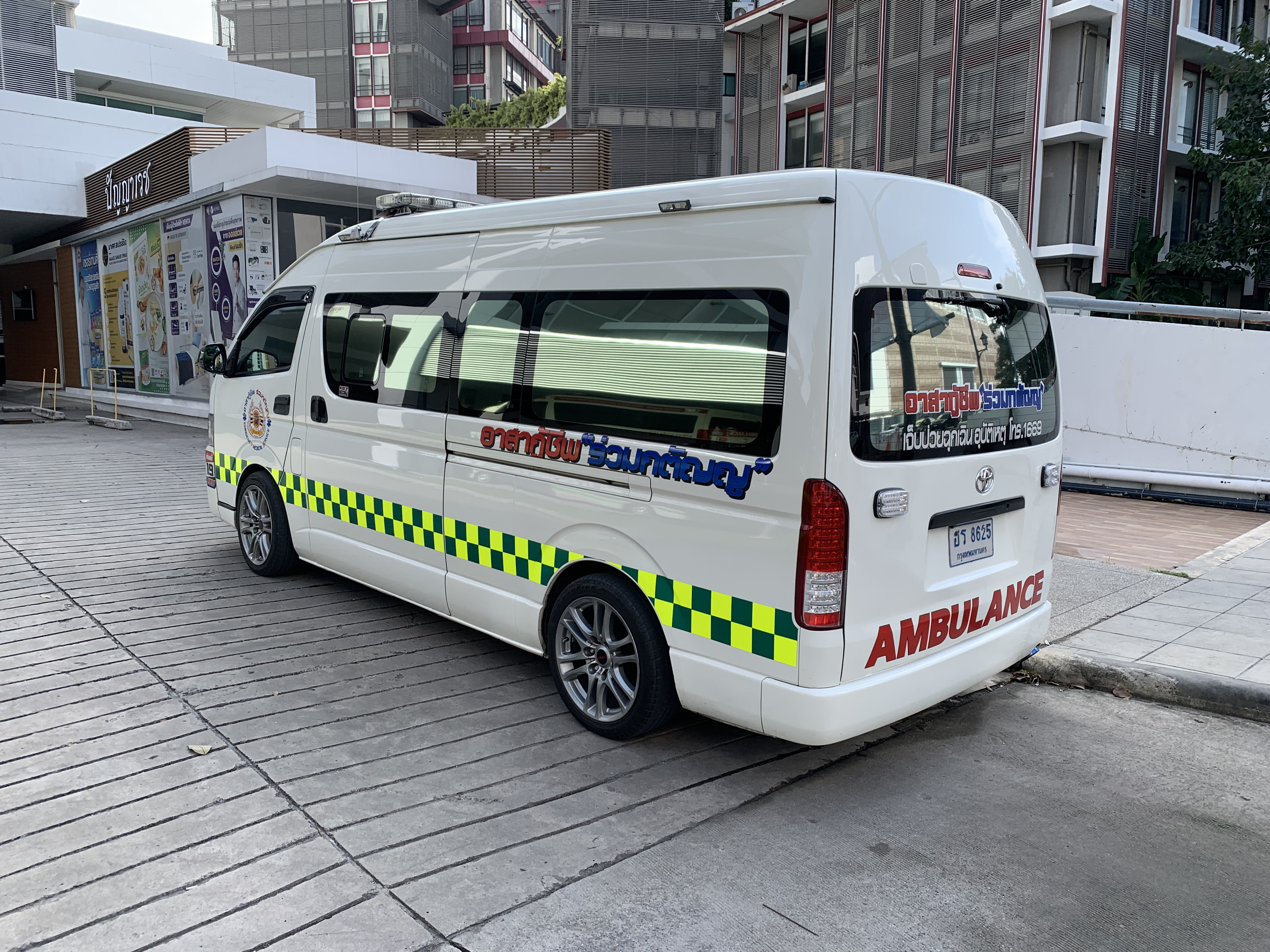
An ambulance of Ruamkatanyu Foundation at a hospital in Pak Kret

Thailand has an unconventional approach to providing first responders in an emergency: it sends volunteers. Some 65 percent of emergency cases in Bangkok are handled by volunteers. Fully equipped ambulances with professional staff are sent only if required.

There are three levels of medical emergency help in Thailand, from first responder (FR) level to basic life support (BLS) level, and advanced life support (ALS) level. Most volunteers have attained the FR level. They are affiliated with foundations and local administrative bodies. Thailand's Medical Emergency Hotline center responds to about 1.5 million medical emergencies each year. About a million involved FR teams transporting patients to medical facilities. BLS and ALS teams handled about 200,000 cases each.

Two organizations, the Poh Teck Tung Foundation and the Ruamkatanyu Foundation are the two largest free first responders in Bangkok. They rely on private donations, but sometimes volunteers must use their own money to buy vehicles, gas, uniforms, and medical equipment. Volunteers are not allowed to accept money from hospitals or from victims. The volunteers say they do this to help people or as a way to earn karma for the next life. The training level of volunteers is not high, just 24 hours. The National Institute of Emergency Medicine (NIEMS) is seeking to increase minimum training to 40 hours, a move initially opposed by the Rescue Network of Thailand, an association of voluntary first responders.

Not all first responder organizations are altruistic. Significant money must be at stake as, sometimes, competition for patients between organizations leads to turf wars and even gun play.

== Urban-rural divide ==
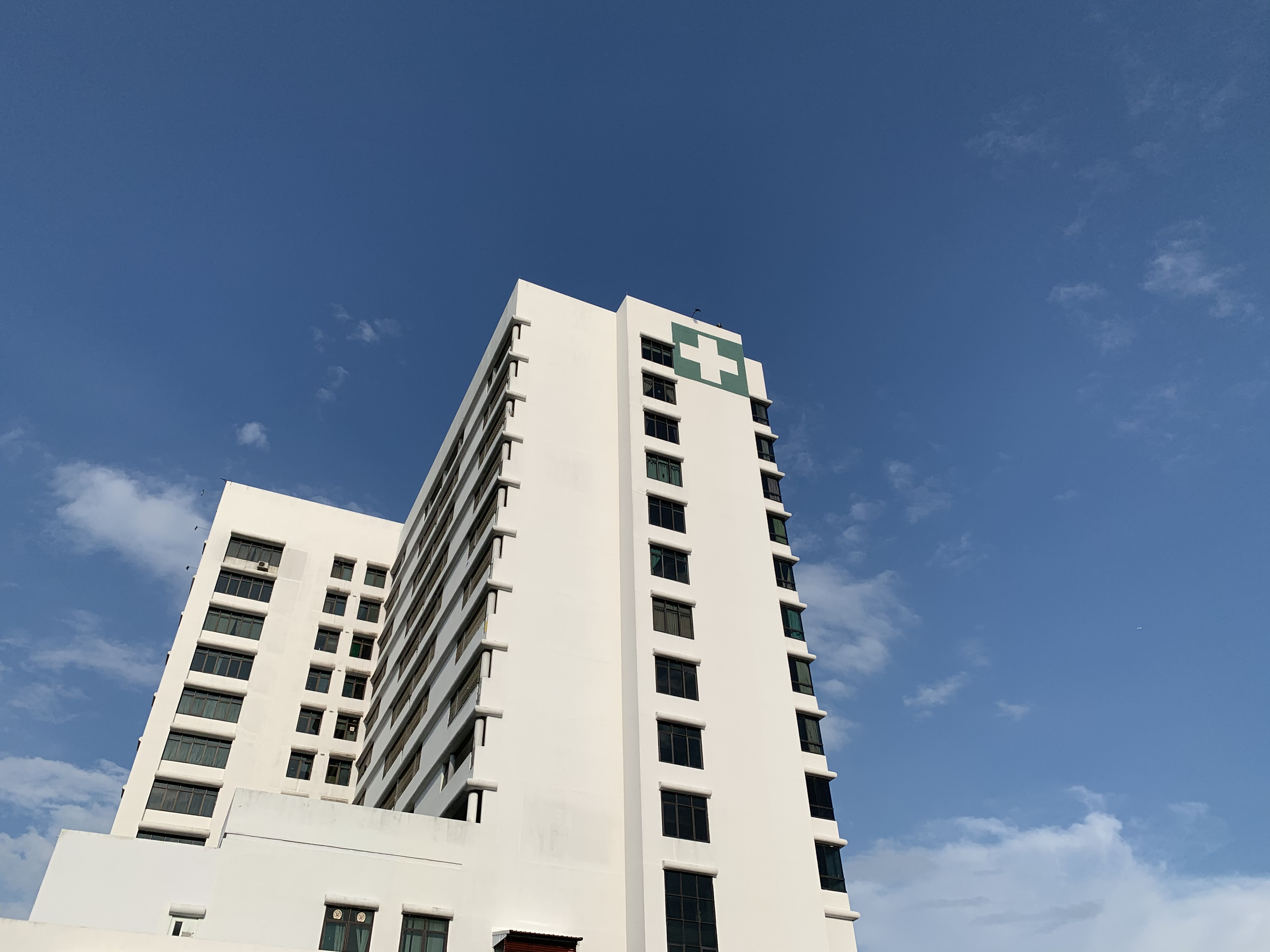
HRH Princess Maha Chakri Sirindhorn Medical Centre in Nakhon Nayok Province is a teaching hospital of Faculty of Medicine, Srinakharinwirot University which has a campus in Bangkok

For much of its history, rural areas in Thailand were under-served medically. Rural health centers failed to attract health workers as they could not compete with urban areas offering higher salaries and more social amenities. The government, in 1975, launched a medical welfare scheme for poor and vulnerable citizens, both rural and urban. They trained health workers specifically to work in rural areas. Government policy-makers later required all doctors trained in Thailand to start their careers by working in rural hospitals before moving to urban hospitals. The Medical Council of Thailand runs the three-year national internship program that almost all medical school graduates must participate in, which is a criterion for further residency training. In 1992, the Collaborative Project to Increase Rural Doctor (CPIRD) Program was introduced by the Ministry of Public Health and Ministry of Education in order to increase the number of doctors in rural areas.

To control brain drain, a frequent occurrence in the 1980s, they stopped training medical personnel in English and created good working environments in rural areas. These measures have only been partially successful: in 2009, a study found that there was one physician per 565 persons in Bangkok, but only one physician per 2,870 persons in Isan. As of 2019, Thailand produces 3,000 doctors yearly at 40 medical education centers.

== See also ==
- Medical tourism
- Health in Thailand
- Deafness in Thailand
- United Hatzalah
