= Kalākaua's 1881 world tour =

Tour by King Kalākaua of the Hawaiian Kingdom

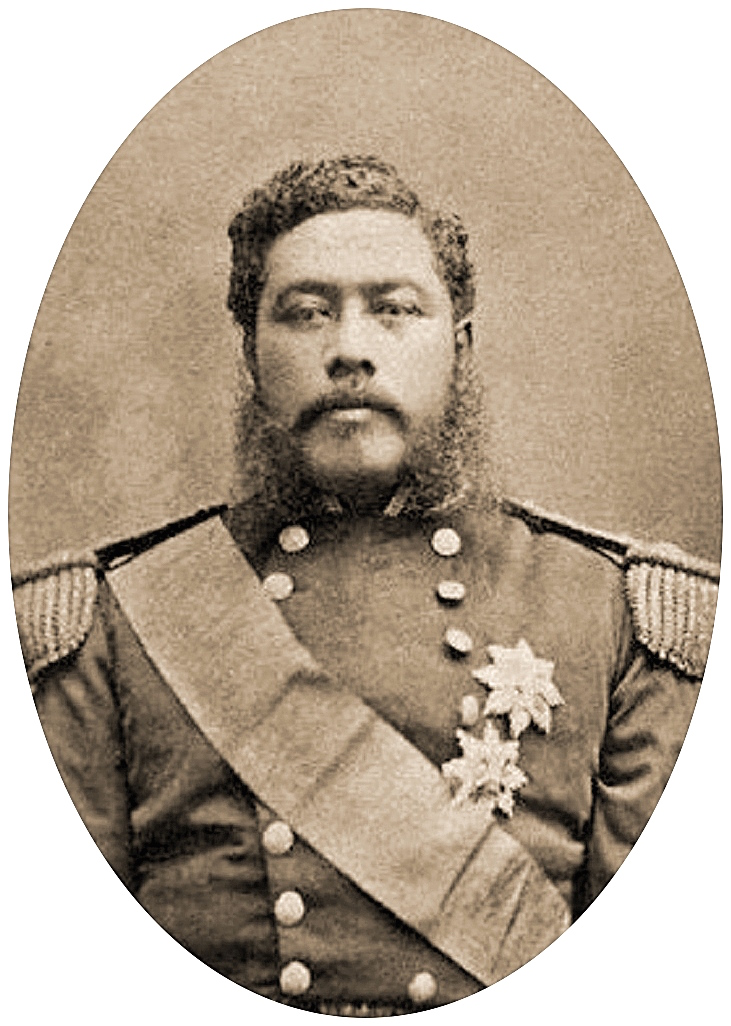
King Kalākaua

The 1881 world tour of King Kalākaua of the Hawaiian Kingdom was his attempt to save the Hawaiian culture and population from extinction by importing a labor force from Asia-Pacific nations. His efforts brought the small island nation to the attention of world leaders, but sparked rumors that the kingdom was for sale. Critics in Hawaii believed the labor negotiations were just an excuse to see the world. The 281-day trip gave Kalākaua the distinction of being the first monarch to circumnavigate the globe; his 1874 travels had made him the first reigning monarch to visit the United States and the first honoree of a state dinner at the White House.

== Tour summary ==
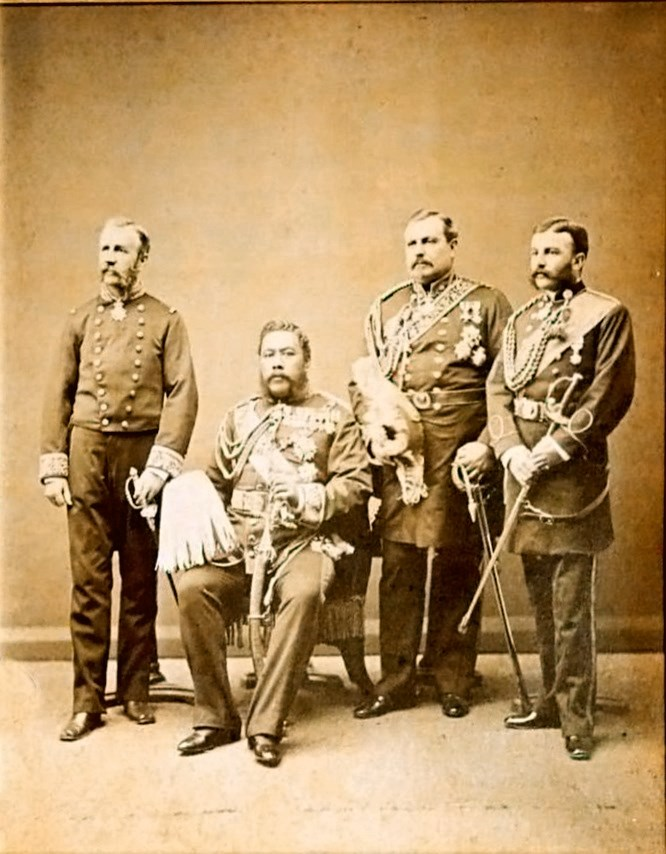
Kalākaua, his aides Charles Hastings Judd and George W. Macfarlane and cook Robert von Oelhoffen during their world tour.

Kalākaua met with heads of state in Asia, the Mideast and Europe, to encourage an influx of sugar plantation labor in family groups, as well as unmarried women as potential brides for Hawaii's existing contract laborers. While in Asia, he tried to forestall American ambitions by offering a plan to Emperor Meiji for putting Hawaii under the protection of the Empire of Japan with an arranged marriage between his niece Kaʻiulani and a Japanese prince. On his visit to Portugal, he negotiated a treaty of friendship and commerce with Hawaii that would provide a legal framework for the emigration of Portuguese laborers to Hawaii. The king had an audience in Rome with Pope Leo XIII and met with many of the crowned heads of Europe. Britain's Queen Victoria and the splendor of her royal life impressed him more than any other monarchy; having been greatly affected by the ornate trappings of European sovereigns, he would soon have Hawaii's monarchy mirror that grandeur.

The king traveled with no security guards; only a small group of personal friends made the journey with him. Except for land transportation in cities, and two loaned ships in China and the US, his modes of transportation were seldom reserved exclusively for him. He shared regularly scheduled steamships and rail transport with fare-paying passengers. On the Red Sea, he played cards and danced with other passengers. Like other tourists, he visited the white elephants of Siam, the Giza pyramid complex in Egypt, tourist sites in India, and museums in Europe. Along the way, he exceeded his original budget, shopping regardless, and sent letters back home.

President James A. Garfield died four days before they arrived back in the United States, and Kalākaua paid a courtesy call to newly inaugurated President Chester A. Arthur at the White House in Washington, D.C. There were no public or private appearances for the king in New York, only a day at Coney Island. Before leaving the eastern US, the king met with Thomas Edison to see a demonstration of electric lights, and visited Virginia's Fort Monroe. He toured Hampton Normal and Agricultural School, and shopped for horses in Kentucky. The royal party boarded a train to California, where they were house guests of Claus Spreckels at his estate in Aptos (near Santa Cruz), and spent a few days seeing the sights before sailing back to Hawaii. Kalākaua was successful in jump-starting new immigration, the first transplants arriving in Hawaii less than a year later. In the years that followed, he began emulating the lifestyles of European royalty with expensive furnishings in Iolani Palace, a public coronation for himself, and a two-week public celebration of his birthday.

== Background ==
Journey of King Kalākaua in 1881

No other sovereign ruler had ever accomplished the feat of circling the globe, but Kalākaua, the last king of the Hawaiian Islands, had previously set other records. He was the first reigning monarch to visit the United States during his 1874 visit to Washington, D.C., for negotiations on the Reciprocity Treaty of 1875. The state dinner in his honor hosted by President Ulysses S. Grant was the first White House state dinner ever given. According to the personal writings of Queen Dowager Emma, a political opponent of his, (Note: When Kamehameha V died in 1872 without an heir, the 1864 Constitution of the Hawaiian Kingdom stipulated, in such case, that a new monarch would be elected by the legislature to start a new royal line of succession. Emma and Kalākaua were political opponents in the second election following the death of the childless Lunalilo, the first elected Hawaiian monarch. Later, in her personal diary, Queen Emma described the 1881 trip as "his tour of pleasure & self-praise".) Kalākaua supposedly had the intention in 1874 of making a world tour "for his personal gratification and vanity".

The islands were officially the Hawaiian Kingdom but had generally been known as the Sandwich Islands since the 1778 visit of Captain James Cook. The estimated population of Native Hawaiians when Cook arrived was 800,000. With the arrival of whaling ships and missionaries in the early 19th century, the Native Hawaiians were exposed to diseases for which they had no immunity and began dying in large numbers. The official 1878 census showed only 44,088 individuals who claimed Hawaiian ethnicity. The sugar plantation work force in the islands and the dwindling population of the Hawaiian race had been Kalākaua's ongoing concerns. On December 24, 1880, he signed an act of the legislative assembly acknowledging corruption in the immigration system and authorizing Minister of the Interior Henry A. P. Carter to take charge of licensing immigration brokers.

Immediately following the signing of the legislation, he visited each major island in the kingdom for a personal look at how the reciprocity treaty had affected his people. In a speech before an audience of Native Hawaiians at a Congregational church on Kauai, Kalākaua related his concerns, "I will speak to you of one of our great questions, which is the supply of people, not only to meet the requirements of all our industries but to assist in the increase of a Hawaiian population." He wanted to bring in immigrants from Asia-Pacific nations, as well as Europe and the United States, to save the declining population of the Hawaiian race from completely dying out. Prior labor immigration had been mostly unmarried men, and he hoped to attract unmarried women as potential wives for them, as well as bringing in family groups.

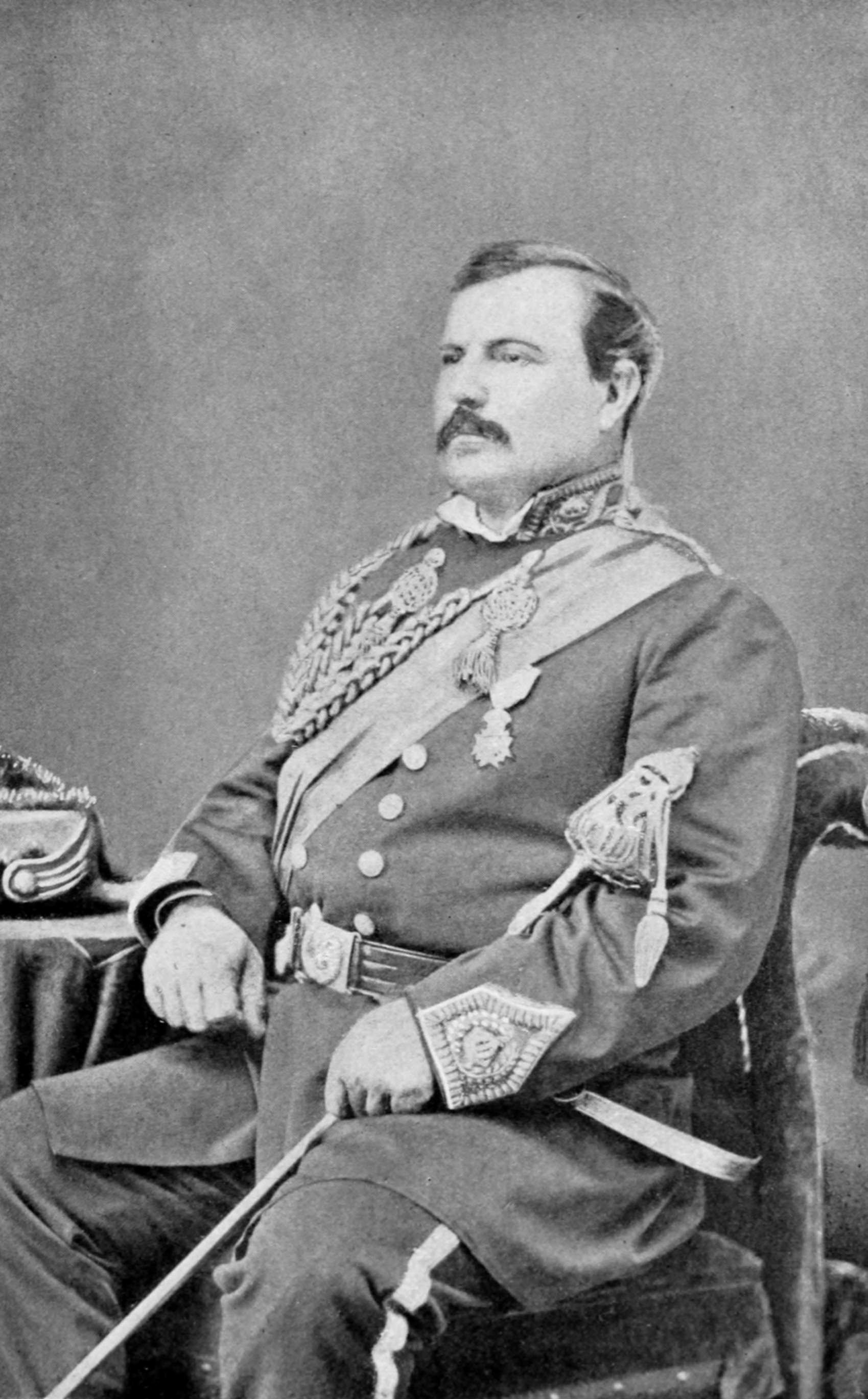
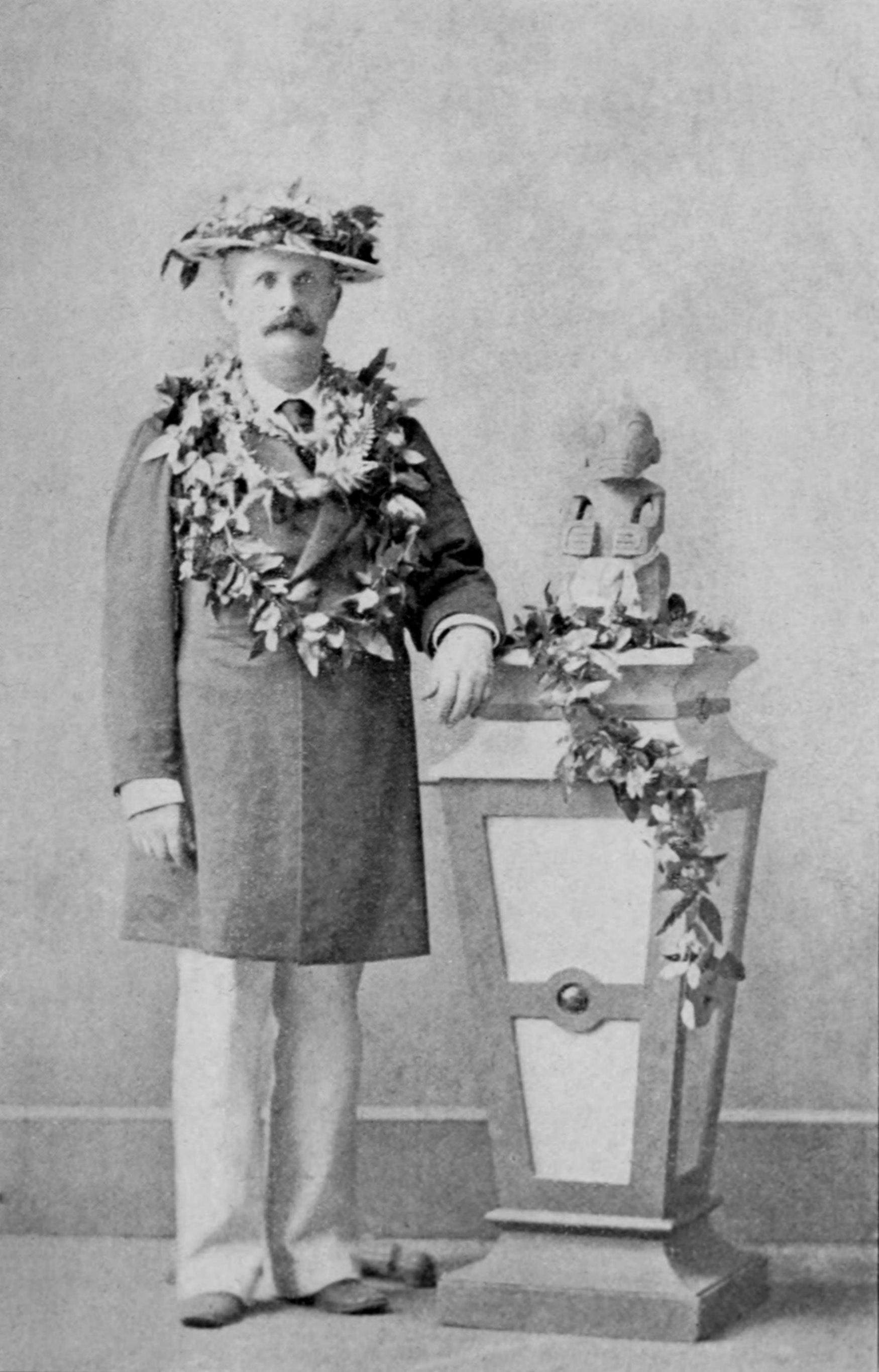
Charles Hastings Judd and William Nevins Armstrong

Kalākaua appointed William Nevins Armstrong as Attorney General in December. Armstrong had been born to Presbyterian missionaries Clarissa and Richard Armstrong in Lahaina. He had known Kalākaua since their early days at the Chiefs Children's School on Maui where he and classmate Charles Hastings Judd became friends with the future king. He graduated from Yale University and became a successful lawyer before returning to Hawaii. Judd had been on Kalākaua's staff since he was elected king, soon after becoming part of his Privy Council, as well as being his chamberlain and private secretary.

Years later Armstrong remembered the invitation to join the tour as having arisen in a casual conversation, during which he did not believe the king was serious. He realized the proposed tour was not just idle conversation when the king informed his Cabinet of his plans and chose Armstrong, Judd, and his personal cook Robert von Oelhoffen as his only traveling companions. (Note: Only his monogram "von O" is given in the original edition, Armstrong 1904, pp. 3–4: "rumour that he was the Baron von O____. This was verified by the suite during the tour". The 2013 Tuttle edition gives full name.) At a state dinner held by Kalākaua and his ministers a week before departure, Armstrong spoke of their youthful dreams of sailing around the world finally being brought to fruition.

Minister of the Interior Carter issued a Bureau of Immigration Ordinance on January 14, 1881, stipulating the terms and conditions under which new immigrants would be allowed into the islands. On January 17, Kalākaua appointed Armstrong as Royal Commissioner of Immigration; Carter became acting Attorney General until their return. Armstrong had instructions to return with a feasibility study indicating which nations were likely to provide "a desirable population" for the Hawaiian labor force. William L. Green, Minister of Foreign Affairs, followed up with a communique to Hawaii's consulates stating the goals for the tour.

Kalākaua's sister and heir-apparent Liliʻuokalani was to act as Regent during his absence. She devoted a chapter of her 1898 book Hawaii's Story to her brother's tour. Her assertion was that the "missionary party" tried to exert its control by insisting that she only be allowed to be in charge of a temporary council and that all decisions in the king's absence were to be made by the entire council. She balked at the suggestion and demanded that her regency have full royal power; he agreed.

Farewell receptions were held for the king by the Catholic and Protestant communities in Honolulu on the eve of his departure. John Mākini Kapena, a member of the House of Nobles, spoke to the assembled well-wishers gathered at Kawaiahaʻo Church, stating "…The great nations now look with respect on this little Kingdom and will have still more, when they see our king traveling among them for information to benefit his people, Let us all pray every day for the king's health, and safe return to his people." Throughout the night, his subjects serenaded him with traditional oli (chants) and mele (songs) outside the palace.

Kalākaua's Masonic ties as Master of Lodge Le progrès de l'Océanie would give him a global brotherhood in his travels. He and his chosen companions boarded the steamship City of Sydney at 6:30 a.m., January 20, bound for San Francisco. As the king made his way onto the ship, many in the crowd at the dock reached out to touch him. Major George W. Macfarlane, his aide-de-camp, would accompany them as far as California. The king traveled as Aliʻi Kalākaua and as Prince Kalākaua, rather than in his capacity as head of state. The intent was to give the impression of a personal vacation, thereby avoiding the large costly retinue required for official business. The Royal Hawaiian Band, the Hawaiian army, and a large contingent of well-wishers bid them farewell as the City of Sydney sailed out.

== California, January 29 – February 8 ==
The City of Sydney arrived at San Francisco during a rain storm a week later, and Kalākaua's party ensconced themselves in the Palace Hotel. On arrival of this port the "royal standard" was flown on the mainmast, and acknowledged by the 21-gun salute, and this recurred at subsequent ports entered by the king's suite during the trip. (Note: The "royal standard" here is assumed to be the "royal (or king's) flag" by e.g., the Japanese translators of Armstrong's travelogue, though according to a book authored by Kalākaua, "royal standard" stood for the feathered kāhili, and in his retold historical anecdtote, Kamauaua's son Kaupeʻepeʻe had his barge equipped so that "the masthead flung a saucy pennon.. surmounted by a kahili")

Spectators amassed at the train station for their arrival in Sacramento that week, during which the royal group visited the California State Legislature. They were accompanied in California's capital by Governor George Clement Perkins, sugar baron Claus Spreckels, and water engineer Hermann Schussler, who had worked on several projects in Hawaii.

During the week, the king and Judd were made honorary members of the Pacific Yacht Club in Sausalito at a reception hosted by Commodore R. S. Floyd. Kalākaua was also feted at a gala in San Francisco's Chinatown, given by the Chinese Consul-General and attended by leaders of the local Chinese community. It was Armstrong who delivered the after-dinner speech and offered a toast to continued good relations with the Chinese population in Hawaii.

In response to Kalākaua's expressed fondness for music and the company of women, "The Ladies of the Palace Hotel" threw a formal-attire grand ball in his honor. A news commentary on the California visit stated, "… it may be said that every hour of King Kalākaua's stay in San Francisco has been filled up with a grand ovation of activities."

== Asia: March 4 – June 7 ==
=== Japan: March 4–18 ===
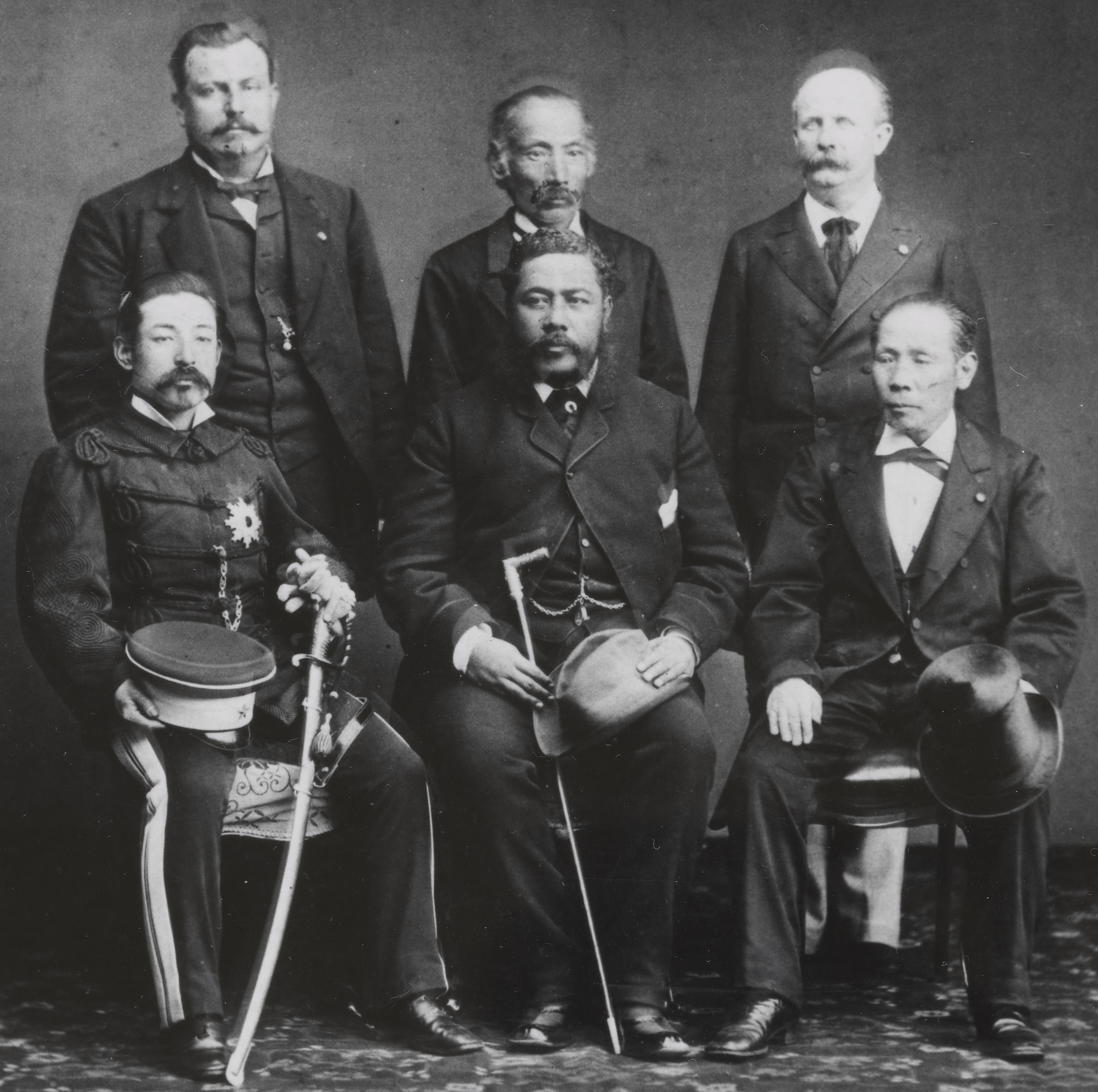
(top row L-R) Col. Charles Hastings Judd, Jugai Tokuno Riyosaki, and William N. Armstrong, (bottom row L-R) Prince Higashifushimi Yoshiaki, King Kalakaua, and Japanese Minister of Finance Sano Tsunetani in Japan (1881)

The party sailed on RMS Oceanic out of San Francisco on February 8. Reaching the Empire of Japan on March 4, they were surprised by elaborate welcoming ceremonies that included the playing of the anthem Kalākaua had written, "Hawaiʻi Ponoʻī". They had not given advance notice to the Japanese government of their pending visit, but the government had been alerted by a telegraph from the Imperial General Consul in San Francisco. Believing a formal reception was required by their 1871 treaty with the Hawaiian Kingdom, they welcomed the king as a friendly head of state. In deference, Kalākaua acquiesced to his being treated as if he were on an official state visit.

The king and his small group spent just under three weeks on their tour of Japan. They were formally welcomed at the Tokyo Imperial Palace and taken to Shintomiza, the Imperial Theatre, to be entertained by a kabuki drama. The following day Emperor Meiji held a state dinner for his visitors. The Emperor presented the king with two suits of Japanese armor, and bestowed upon him the Order of the Chrysanthemum with Badge, and the Star of the Order. The king reciprocated with a royal painting of Queen Kapiolani and himself, and presented the Emperor with the Grand Cross of Kamehameha. In the same ceremony, Judd and Armstrong were given the Order of the Rising Sun. By way of understanding local education and industries, the king toured the College of the Imperial Guard, Imperial Engineering College, and the Oji Paper Company. Two of Japan's generals gave him a guided tour through the empire's arsenal.

Concern over a possible United States seizure of the Hawaiian Islands motivated Kalākaua to hold a secret meeting with the Emperor to bring Hawaii under the protective aegis of the Japanese empire. He proposed to unite the two nations with an arranged marriage between his 5-year-old niece Princess Kaʻiulani and 13-year-old Prince Yamashina Sadamaro. (Note: Also known as Prince Fushimi Sadamaro, Prince Komatsu or finally Prince Higashifushimi Yorihito due to his various adoption into different ōke cadet branches of the Japanese imperial house.). Historian Ralph Kuykendall said the proposal was rejected both by Sadamaro, upon advice of his father, and by the government of Japan. The Hawaiian king also recommended that Emperor Meiji create a "Union and Federation of the Asiatic nations and sovereigns" with Japan as its head, although the Emperor politely declined this idea at a later date.

Japanese newspapers cautioned about looking for an emigrating labor force in Japan, stating that their own country had large areas of available agricultural land that went untouched. A ball was planned in the king's honor by the Masonic Fraternity of Yokohama, which he bowed out of when he learned of the assassination of Alexander II of Russia. The Kalākaua group arrived in Kobe on March 18 for a sightseeing tour and lunch with the mayor. On March 22, they embarked on the steamship Tokio Maru bound for Shanghai.

Adieu Japan – Beautiful Japan. I felt as if I would have a continual longing to see this interesting country with its kind and hospitable inhabitants for a long long time. Aloha Nui

— Kalākaua's diary entry

=== China: March 25 – April 9 ===
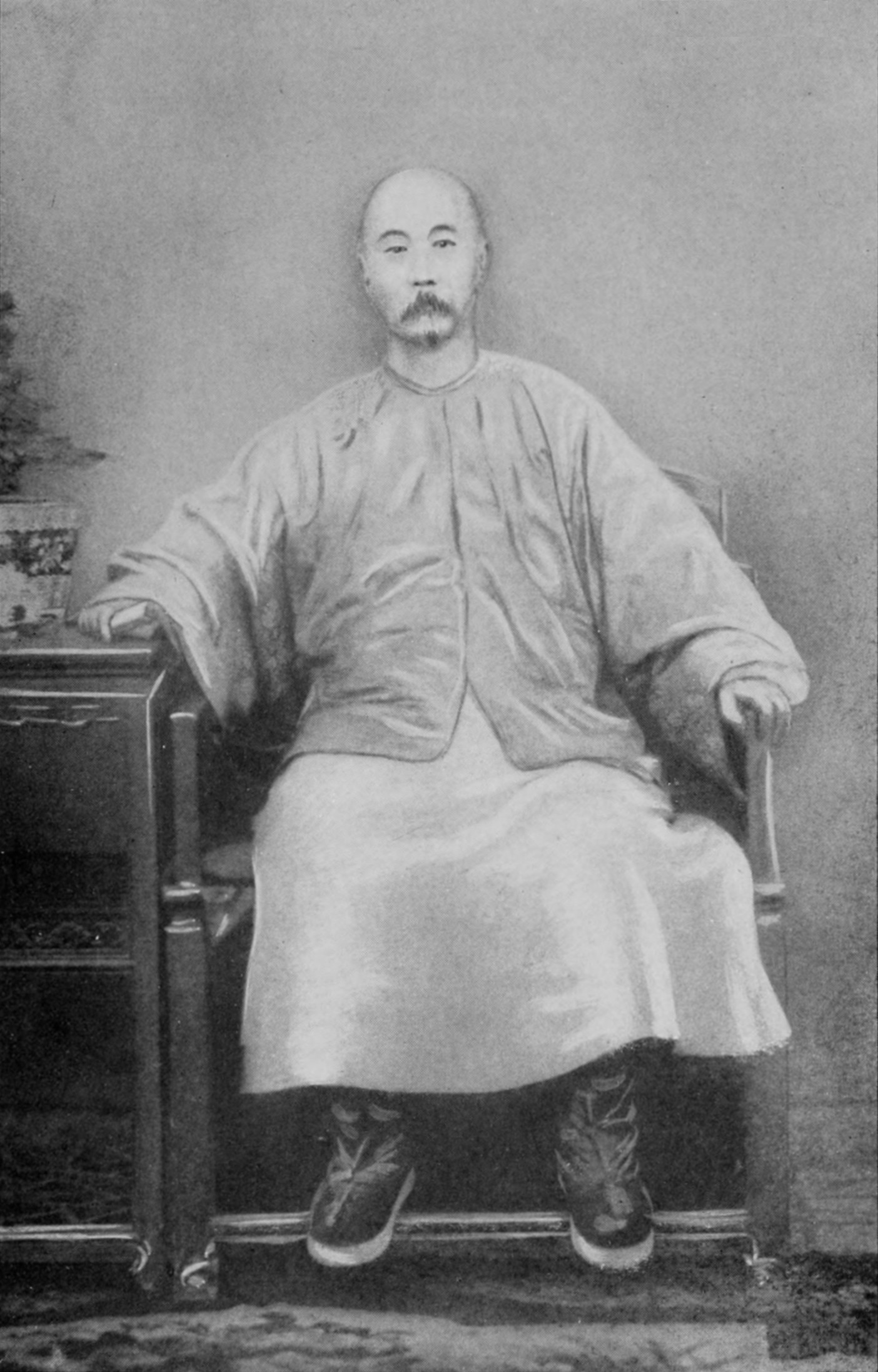
Li Hung Chang

The Chinese had been a part of Hawaii's culture since the late 18th century, when the islands were first visited by Chinese merchants and tradesmen. In 1852, sugar plantations began recruiting unskilled labor from China. Because these men initially intended to return to China upon the completion of their contracts, most came without families.

Upon arriving in Shanghai on March 25, Kalākaua spent two days in residence at the Astor House Hotel, receiving foreign diplomats. They departed for Tientsin on March 27 when Viceroy Li Hung Chang offered the steamship Pautah for their use.

Kalākaua met with the Viceroy on March 31 to propose the emigration of unmarried Chinese women, as well as Chinese family units to Hawaii, to counterbalance the labor population of unmarried Chinese men. The Viceroy responded favorably and agreed to co-sponsor such an emigration with the Hawaiian government. Li arranged several events to provide Kalākaua the opportunity to meet the city's influential persons. A copy of a draft of a proposed treaty was forwarded to Hawaii's Minister of Foreign Affairs Green. The Hong Kong Daily News held a positive view of Hawaii's treatment of existing Chinese laborers, but stated that the Chinese government needed to provide financial assistance for family emigration to Hawaii. The royal party returned to Shanghai on April 6. A proposed trip to Beijing was aborted when Empress Dowager Ci'an died on April 8. They sailed out of China the next day.

=== Hong Kong: April 12–21 ===
The traveling group departed on the steamship Thibet for British Hong Kong, arriving April 12. Kalākaua was the guest of Hong Kong's governor John Pope Hennessy at Government House, where the king was honored with a diplomatic reception and banquet. Armstrong delivered the after-dinner speech.

Kalākaua was given celebratory receptions at the Victoria Lodge of Freemasons No. 1026 and Perseverance Lodge No. 1165, both in Hong Kong. Judd was voted into the masonry brotherhood at the latter, Lodge No. 1165.

They left Hong Kong on the steamship Killarney on April 21.

=== Siam (Thailand): April 26–30 ===
The steamship Killarney arrived in Bangkok on April 26. How they would be received was speculative, since Hawaii had no treaty with Siam. Upon arrival, they were carried aboard a royal yacht up the Chao Phraya River to Bangkok. From there, they were carried on silk chairs to one of the many palaces in Bangkok for the duration of their visit. The following day they met with King Chulalongkorn who told Kalākaua that the Siamese and Native Hawaiians were related by the common Malayan bloodline. A member of the Siamese royal family escorted Kalākaua to see the nation's famed white elephants.

Chulalongkorn hosted a state dinner and made Kalākaua a Knight of the Grand Cross of the Crown of Siam; Kalākaua reciprocated with the Royal Order of Kamehameha I. Armstrong and Judd were given the Knight Grand Cross of the Crown of Siam, Third Class. No labor negotiations took place, although Kalākaua later mentioned in his letter to his brother-in-law Oahu Governor John Owen Dominis that "an exchange of decorations" with leaders in Asian nations potentially opened doors for future talks on immigration. He included a lengthy list of decorations to be sent to various members of the Siamese nobility.

Kalākaua's party embarked on the steamship Bangkok for Singapore on May 1. As the ship sailed away, they were bid farewell by a military gun salute, and shouts of approval by well-wishers at the dock.

=== Peninsular Malaya (Singapore and Malaysia) Burma (Myanmar): May 6–24 ===
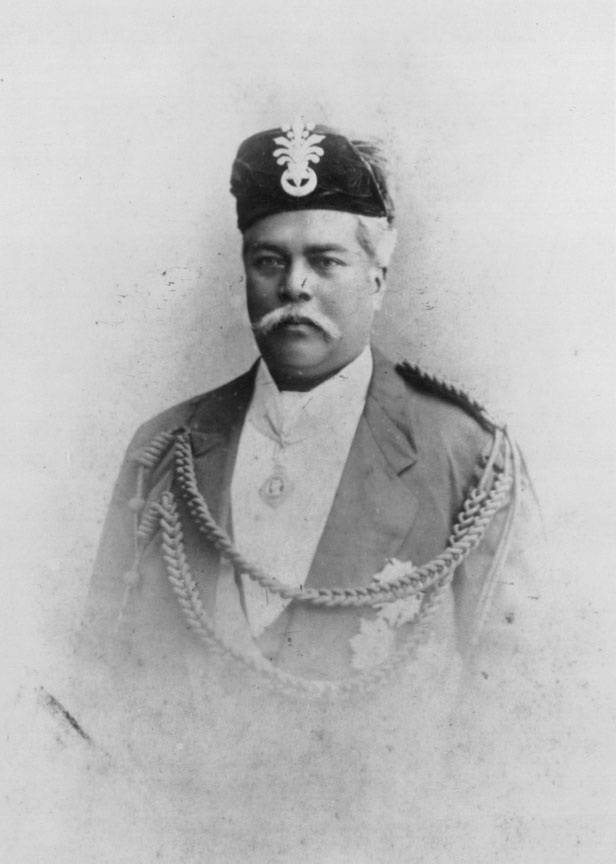
Abu Bakar, Maharaja of Johor

By the time the Bangkok docked in Singapore on May 6, Kalākaua had had enough of formal events, turning down the offer of accommodations at Government House in favor of the simplicity of a hotel. Nevertheless, Governor Frederick Weld held a formal reception and state dinner for him.

When he visited Sultan Abu Bakar of Johor on May 10 at the Palace of Istana Besar, 12 miles from Singapore, he was greeted as a brother. They squared off in the Sultan's palace over a billiard table. Armstrong was advised by Abu Bakar that while the inhabitants of Singapore and the Malay peninsula were good at varied professions, agricultural labor was not one of them. Abu Bakar told Armstrong that the Malay states were importing plantation labor from China and India.

Kalākaua and Judd visited the Lodge Zetland in the East, No. 548, in Singapore on May 11, where Judd was bestowed with the third degree in masonry. The king had hoped to buy pearls for his wife Queen Kapiolani in Singapore, but found the prices prohibitive. On May 12, the royal entourage departed on the steamship Mecca.

Malacca was a six-hour layover on May 13, affording limited sightseeing. Kalākaua was given walking canes as souvenirs. Their one day at Penang on May 15 saw a visit by Governor John Frederick Adolphus McNair who hosted them at his residence of Suffolk House.

A change of transportation at Moulmein put them on the steamship Pembo (or Pamba), arriving in Rangoon on May 22. During their stopover, they were entertained at Government House by the English Commissioner, and Kalākaua attended worship services at the chapel of St. John's College. They departed on May 24.

=== India: May 28 – June 7 ===
Several plantation owners in Hawaii favored the importation of coolie labor from the East India region. (Note: States and territories of East India in 1881: Bihar, Jharkhand, Odisha, Andaman and Nicobar Islands) Henry A. P. Carter and British consul James Hay Wodehouse had already visited England in 1879 to open a door for the process. They were discouraged by stipulations that Hawaii would be forced to pass legislation that would in essence be a detailed labor contract. There was a further requirement that such a Hawaiian law could not be changed without the approval of the governments of both Great Britain and East India. The prospect was explored through the end of 1880, when Hawaii's immigration board decided the islands could not import Indian labor within the parameters required.

According to a report of the trip Armstrong later filed with the Hawaiian government, any negotiations for Indian contract labor had to be done with the British government in London, so no talks were conducted during their time in India. They arrived in Calcutta on May 28 and visited the Alipore Zoological Gardens. Kalākaua spent one day sitting in the Calcutta courthouse to observe India's legal process. Their trip across the British India subcontinent was a sightseeing excursion during their last days before sailing to the Middle East, and they stopped to tour the Ellora Caves prior to reaching Bombay. The king soon tired of the long journey, and was bored and restless by the time they arrived at Bombay, where they remained until the departure of their steamship on June 7. There was more in Bombay to interest him: a shopping trip, the Arab Stallion Stables, the Parsi Towers of Silence, and a visit from businessman Sir Jamsetjee Jejeebhoy.

== Egypt: June 20–25 ==
The steamship Rosetta sailed out of Bombay on June 7, carrying Kalākaua and his friends to Aden for an afternoon of shopping on June 14, and then onto the Red Sea. In a letter to Liliʻuokalani, Kalākaua described how his romantic boyhood dreams of sailing the Red Sea were dashed by the tedium of a week on the water with no land in sight. All was not lost, since he and the estimated 70 other passengers passed the week playing games and dancing.

Arriving at the Suez on June 20, they boarded a train for Cairo. With no existing treaty with Egypt, they were pleasantly surprised by Khedive Tewfik Pasha's offer of his Cairo palace during their stay, accommodating them with a tour of the Pyramid complex and the Great Sphinx on the Giza Plateau.

Writing to his sister Liliʻuokalani from Cairo, he responded to her letter apprising him of the smallpox epidemic in the islands: "… what is the use of praying after 293 lives of our poor people have gone to their everlasting place. Is it to thank him for killing or is it to thank him for sending them to him or to the other place … To save the life of the people is to work and not pray."

The Egyptian Gazette published Kalākaua's acceptance speech when the Grand Lodge of Egypt freemasons made him Honorary Grand Master of the Great Orient of Egypt. He was honored with a state ball in Alexandria by the Khedive on June 24, the day before they left on the steamer Asia.

== Europe: June 29 – September 13 ==
Throughout their European stops, Armstrong saw a willingness among some who were looking for a life change to consider emigrating to Hawaii as plantation labor. Generally, however, they were looking for a stake in land ownership that the kingdom was not willing to offer.

=== Italy: June 29 – July 4 ===
Armstrong mentioned a brief stop at Catania, on the island of Sicily, probably on June 29, visiting the Catania Cathedral and Mount Etna. (Note: No other source has mentioned this, and Armstrong did not specify a date. In his letters home, Kalākaua never mentioned Sicily, although he says they arrived in Naples at 11 a.m. on June 30. According to the Rick Steves' Europe website, a current-day ferry ride between Catania and Naples is a 12-hour trip, so the sightseeing on Catania had to have been the previous day.) Their next stop was at Naples on June 30, where they were greeted by the Prefect of Naples, the Commanding General and Admiral of Naples, and Celso Caesar Moreno, presenting himself to local officials as the Minister of Foreign Affairs of Hawaii. Moreno was a friend of Kalākaua's who many felt was a con artist. Armstrong described him as someone who scammed his way into Kalākaua's good graces in Hawaii. Moreno had been appointed Hawaii's Minister of Foreign Affairs in 1880. He created a divisive situation that put the king at odds with his own cabinet, leading to Moreno's dismissal five days later. He and Kalākaua remained on cordial terms. Moreno had been appointed the guardian of three Hawaiian students, including the future rebel leaders Robert Napuʻuako Boyd and Robert William Wilcox, who were being educated in Italy as a part of the government funded study-abroad program. Moreno was relieved of that responsibility once the king was made aware that Moreno had misrepresented them as Kalākaua's natural sons, and that he had misled the Italian government into believing he had an official position with the Hawaiian government. The Saturday Press in Honolulu was indignant at his association with Kalākaua and their re-connection in Italy, stating that Moreno "… had fought to the last ditch, and has, we hope, tumbled into it and will remain there."

The royal group spent two hours at Naples National Archaeological Museum before having an audience with king Umberto I and Queen Margherita. They spent the next day seeing more attractions in Naples, before heading for Rome on the afternoon train. Prior to their departure, they had learned of the July 2 shooting of President James A. Garfield in Washington, D.C.

Their time in Rome was a brief two days, during which Kalākaua, Armstrong, and Judd were granted an audience with Pope Leo XIII on July 3. After receiving his blessing, they toured St. Peter's Basilica and other local tourist sites, and left the following day by train. The party traveled across France and Paris without informing the French authorities, which was seen as a breach of official protocol and had to be explained at a later date.

=== England: July 6–24 ===
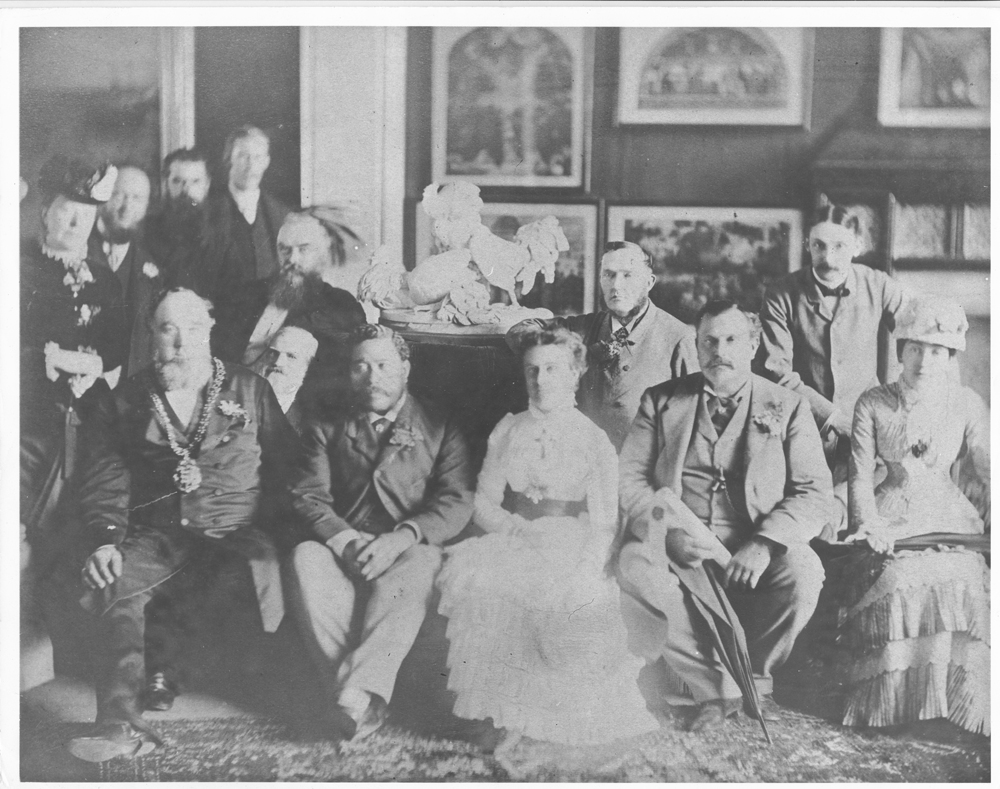
Lord Brassey and his wife entertaining Kalākaua and Judd at their home at Hastings.

The Kalākaua group arrived in London the evening of July 6. The king spent the next day receiving visitors in his suite at Claridge's, later accepting Queen Victoria's offer of the royal box at the Royal Opera House, Covent Garden. While in England, he attended an Eton v Harrow cricket match, and returned to the Royal Opera House to hear opera singer Adelina Patti. The Queen's annual Windsor Great Park review of 50,000 military volunteers drew many high-ranking and titled spectators, including Kalākaua. Following the review, he was entertained by Civil Lord of the Admiralty Thomas Brassey and his wife at their encampment. He attended worship services at Westminster Abbey on Sunday, prior to his afternoon sailing trip with Lord Charles Beresford and guests.

Kalākaua, Armstrong and Judd were formally presented to Queen Victoria at Windsor Castle. Kalākaua's letter to his sister Liliʻuokalani expressed his excitement about meeting the Queen, "… I was quite electrified and monopolized the whole conversation that took place during the interview." His letter was effusive in details about the titled royals and aristocrats they had met, including the Prince and Princess of Wales, and the Crown Prince and Crown Princess of Prussia. The Prince of Wales paid many attentions to Kalākaua, hoping to sway him away from the United States. As kings are more highly ranked than most other titled individuals, he insisted on giving Kalākaua precedence ahead of his brother-in-law, the Crown Prince of Germany and responded to German objections by saying, "Either the brute is a king or else he is an ordinary black nigger, and if he is not a king, why is he here?"

Hawaii's relationship with A. Hoffnung & Company in London dated back to 1877 when Hawaii's Minister of Foreign Affairs Henry A. P. Carter recommended the firm to handle Portuguese emigration to the island kingdom. The firm's founder Abraham Hoffnung was attached to the Hawaiian Board of Immigration in London, and had already succeeded in sending Hawaii 751 Portuguese citizens (237 men, 191 women, and 323 children) in 1879. Kalākaua reconnected with Hoffnung over dinner, and he became part of the royal party as it traveled through Europe.

On July 23, the day before departing for Brussels, Kalākaua had lunch with the Duke of Teck, and inspected ships at the Yarrow Shipbuilders.

=== Belgium, Germany: July 25 – August 4 ===
Kalākaua and Judd left England on July 24, arriving in Brussels the next morning. They spent a few days sightseeing, and visited Waterloo, where Napoleon Bonaparte had been defeated in 1815. Kalākaua presented Belgium's King Leopold II with the Order of Kamehameha when he paid a visit to him.

They arrived at Cologne on July 29, visiting the Cologne Cathedral before continuing on to Berlin. Kalākaua stayed in his Berlin accommodations and took care of his correspondence the first full day of his stay, with German soldiers standing vigil outside his door. He received boisterous expressions of public approval wherever he appeared. During their stay, they attended several military displays and toured museums, castles, and other sites of interest. The king was entertained by the future Kaiser Wilhelm II and his wife, who were receiving him on behalf of Wilhelm's grandfather, the German Emperor. On a visit to Potsdam with Prince Charles of Prussia, Kalākaua was awarded the Grand Cross of the Order of the Red Eagle. Armstrong rejoined the group in Germany, but was too ill to accompany them on their outings. They departed for Vienna on August 4.

=== Vienna, Austria: August 5–8 ===
Onlookers gathered at Vienna's Northwest station in anticipation of Kalākaua's arrival. When he stepped off the train to be escorted by Austrian officials to the Hotel Imperial, cheering rang out from the crowd. He later visited the Imperial Arsenal. After a tour of the Belvedere, he attended a concert conducted by Eduard Strauss at the Volksgarten. In the evening he enjoyed a ballet at the Imperial Opera House.

The royal family had already left Vienna for the summer, but Kalākaua got to inspect the troops during military maneuvers at the Schmelz parade grounds. He later had an audience with Archduke Albrecht, Duke of Teschen. In the evening, he returned to the opera house for a performance of Mozart's The Marriage of Figaro. The next two days were spent sightseeing, including the Schönbrunn Palace, St. Stephen's Cathedral, the Votive Church, and the Neue Freie Presse.

On August 8, the king and his friends took the evening train to Paris.

=== Paris: August 10–15 ===
The Royal party arrived at the Gare de l'Est train station in Paris in the pre-dawn hours of August 10, rejoined by Macfarlane. Most of the first day they remained in their suite, recovering from travel exhaustion. They soon ventured out to see to the Auteuil Hippodrome, and stopped by various concert halls.

Armstrong noted that the party was received with "the cold shoulder" by diplomatic authorities for the first time on their trip, while the king in return considered them to be a "mean lot". They had to apologize for the diplomatic slight from the earlier July stopover, and explain the reason why an invitation for the king, received while they were still in London, to attend the Bastille Day celebration as a guest of President Grévy was left unanswered. After the tension was smoothed out, the French foreign minister visited the King in the absence of the president who was not in the capital at that time.

Otherwise, their stay in Paris was filled with well-wishers who came to call at the hotel. Queen Victoria sent her chargé d'affaires to present him with the Grand Cross of the Most Distinguished Order of St. Michael and St. George. After days of visitors, which included world dignitaries and representatives of two different Masonic lodges, Kalākaua and friends attended a performance of Giuseppe Verdi's opera Aida. He was given a tour of the headquarters of Le Figaro, and visited the Société de géographie. On August 15, the royal group, which now included Hoffnung, left on the evening train, bound for Portugal and Spain.

=== Iberian Peninsula (Portugal and Spain): August 19–25 ===
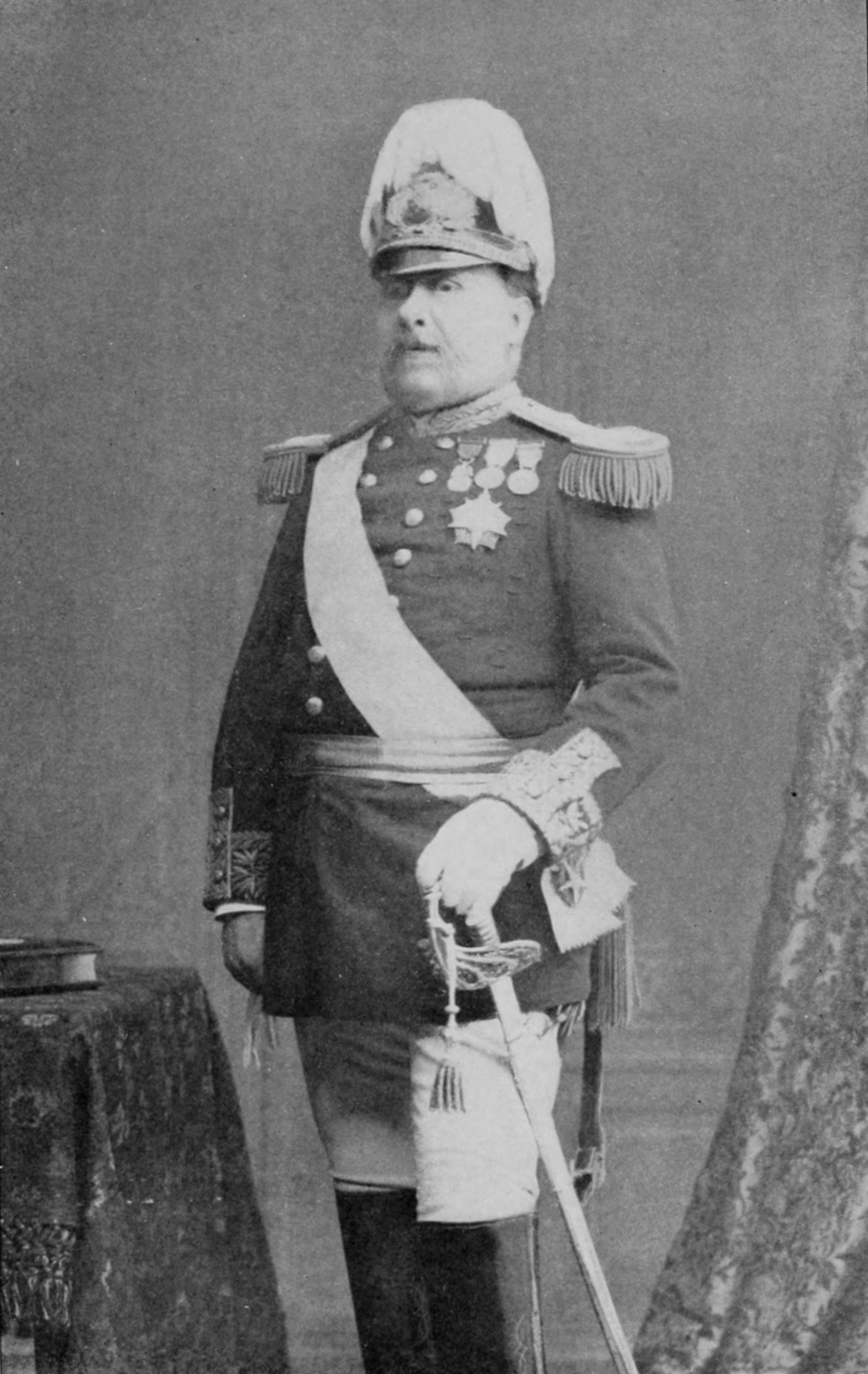
King Luís I of Portugal

Portuguese immigrants had been in Hawaii since the whaling days. Many of them were mixed blood Afro-Portuguese sailors who found the brown-skinned Native Hawaiians free of racial bias towards them. The first Portuguese plantation labor emigration to Hawaii came from the Azores and Madeira in 1878, starved out of their homelands by widespread grape vine fungus. They emigrated mostly in family groups, joining an established community of their own culture.

Armstrong's instructions for Portugal were to negotiate an expanded treaty with the government. They arrived at Santa Apolónia railway station in Lisbon on August 19. Kalākaua was presented with the Grand Cross Order of the Immaculate Conception of Vila Viçosa during an audience with King Luís I at the Palace of Ajuda, and also attended a bullfight with Luis's father King Ferdinand II at the Pena Palace. When they left Portugal on August 24, Armstrong remained behind to initiate a treaty.

The royal group toured Madrid on August 24, visiting the Royal Army, Museo del Prado, and Buen Retiro Park. The Spanish minister presented Kalākaua with the Collar of the Order of Charles III. An announcement was released to the newspapers that an arrangement had been made for Portugal to send 300 families to the Hawaiian Islands in the near future. They departed for Paris on August 25.

=== Revisiting Paris: August 27–30 ===
Winding down his tour, Kalākaua's schedule became less hectic. He spent most of August 27 relaxing in his hotel suite in Paris, and attending to his personal correspondence. A little sightseeing was done over the next two days: Napoleon's tomb at Les Invalides, Bal Mabille, the Louvre, and Palais Bourbon. Dutch heir-apparent Alexander, Prince of Orange, visited the king to thank him for the Grand Cross of the Order of Kalākaua. The king spent his remaining day in the city, August 30, in his hotel suite, saying his farewells.

=== Revisiting London: August 31 – September 6 ===
The train carrying Kalākaua and his travel companions arrived in London at Charing Cross railway station the morning of August 31. In the evening they all attended a performance at Drury Lane Theatre. Armstrong left for New York City on September 1, as the rest of the party went sightseeing and visited the tomb of Arthur Wellesley, 1st Duke of Wellington in St Paul's Cathedral. The following day they visited the Tower of London, and later in the day, Kalākaua received the Royal Order of Vasa from Sweden's chargé d'affaires. On September 3, the royal party visited the Blenheim Gun and Small Arms Works, where they lunched with several dignitaries. After services at St Paul's Cathedral, Kalākaua bestowed the Royal Order of Kalākaua on Hoffnung for his service during their travels around Europe. On September 6, he paid a farewell visit to the Prince and Princess of Wales, before departing for Glasgow, Scotland.

=== Scotland: September 7–13 ===
Kalākaua arrived in Glasgow on September 7. The Lord Provost of Glasgow and the magistrates hosted the king at a dinner party, where he gave a speech praising the contributions of Scotsmen in Hawaii. For the rest of his stay, he toured Loch Lomond and the River Clyde. Visiting Edinburgh on September 9, he toured Dreghorn Castle and the Royal Botanic Garden, where he planted two maple trees. Kalākaua appeared at Freemason Hall to loud cheers. The Grand Conclave of Scotland of the Order of the Red Cross of Constantine made him an honorary member.

Hawaii's royal tourists departed for America via Liverpool on September 13.

== Across the United States: September 23 – October 22 ==
The steamship Celtic pulled into New York Harbor on September 23, carrying Kalākaua, Judd, Macfarlane, and von Oelhoffen. Awaiting them on the dock were Armstrong, Hawaiian consul general Elisha Hunt Allen, Jr. and Claus Spreckels. New York was in mourning over the September 19 death of President Garfield. Out of respect to the solemnity of the tragedy, Kalākaua attended no public or private functions in the city. The royal party did, however, spend a day as private tourists at Coney Island.

In Vienna during the first week in August, Kalākaua had made the acquaintance of The New York Times co-founder George Jones, who noticed the king had an interest in Thomas Edison's work with electric lighting. Returning to New York, Jones arranged for Kalākaua and Armstrong to visit Edison on September 25. The king expressed an urgent need for Honolulu to upgrade its street lighting, which at that time was provided by kerosene lamps. Edison demonstrated some electric light bulbs, and Kalākaua showed interest in the technical details. The Sun newspaper reported that Armstrong joked with Edison about generating electric power from Hawaiian volcanoes, a feat which became possible over a century later with the Puna Geothermal Venture. They left the city by train on the following day for Philadelphia, staying there for a brief rest, and then heading south to Washington, D.C.

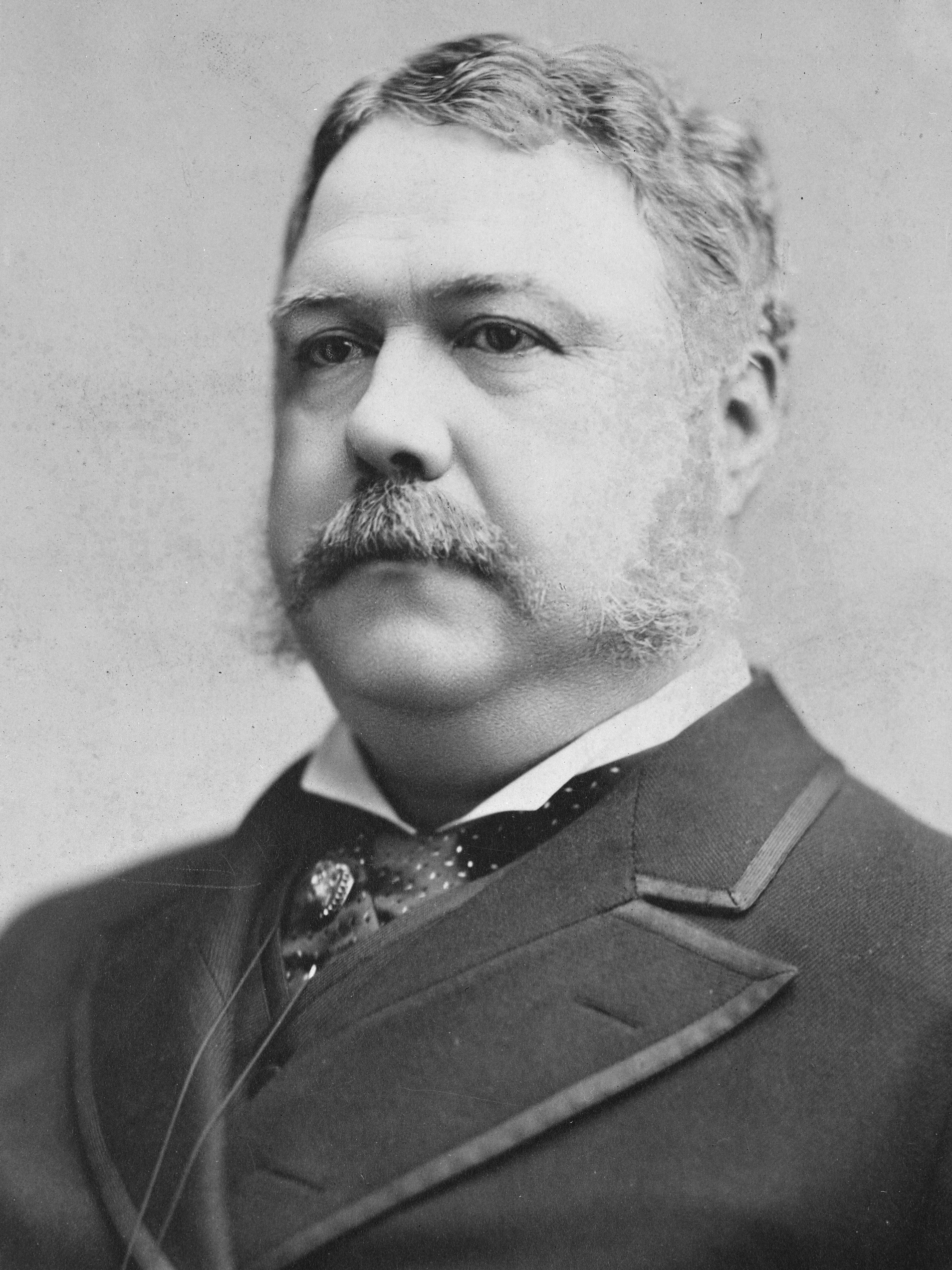
President Chester A. Arthur

Arriving in Washington, D.C., on September 27, they stayed at the Arlington Hotel. On the following day, the party was introduced by the Assistant Secretary of State Robert R. Hitt to the newly inaugurated President Chester A. Arthur, at the home of Virginia Senator John W. Johnston. The informal private interview lasted only twenty minutes but was described as pleasant. Armstrong later described their similarities: "If the President had been a dark or black man, the [physical] resemblance would have been a singular one."

After the presidential visit, the royal party headed to Baltimore where Secretary of State William H. Hunt provided a governmental vessel, the USS Despatch, to transport them to Tidewater Virginia. The king toured Fortress Monroe where General George W. Getty received him before spending the day with Armstrong's brother Samuel at Hampton Normal and Agricultural School. The king was interested in the institution's role in educating Native Americans in the industrial trade, a model he wanted to bring back to his people, even though Samuel Armstrong had modeled his school after the Hilo Boarding School in Hawaii. After a visit to the Old Soldier's Home and a reception at Virginia Hall, the party returned north to Fortress Monroe, where they witnessed a review, and then proceeded to the Norfolk Naval Shipyard. It was reported that the royal party also visited Yorktown to observe the centennial celebration of its siege.

Returning to the capital on October 2, they boarded a train, arriving the next day at Cincinnati, where they stayed at the Grand Hotel. While Armstrong remained in Cincinnati, Kalākaua, Judd, and Macfarlane took a trip to Lexington, Kentucky, visiting the city, meeting the local dignitaries, and spending a night with General William T. Withers at his home Fairlawn, outside the city. The following day they visited the Kentucky thoroughbred farm of Milton H. Sanford, where they purchased two stallions and five mares for shipment back to Honolulu, although contradictory reports in the Louisville press stated they did not purchase any horses. Afterward they returned to Cincinnati and boarded another train heading west.

At a scheduled layover in Chicago, they disembarked only long enough for breakfast and to answer some brief media questions before the train resumed its route. In Omaha, Nebraska, the king was the guest of honor at a reception held in the home of Judge James M. Woolworth. Most of the attendees were friends of the judge's daughter, who had met the king on a vacation in Hawaii. Although Kalākaua had claimed exhaustion from his world trip, he nevertheless danced the whole night with the women guests. Claus and Mrs. Spreckels joined the group at Ogden, Utah.

They arrived in California on October 11. Part of the King's stay was at the Spreckels summer home in Aptos, with a sightseeing trip to Lick Observatory. While he was a guest at the Spreckels home, the sugar baron gave the King two horses and a colt. California friends of the King joined him for a farewell dinner at the Palace Hotel in San Francisco on October 22, just prior to his sailing on the steamship Australia back to Honolulu. Among those attending were Spreckels, Governor Perkins, California state senator Paul Neumann, and University of California president Horace Davis.

== Honolulu homecoming: October 29 – November 6 ==
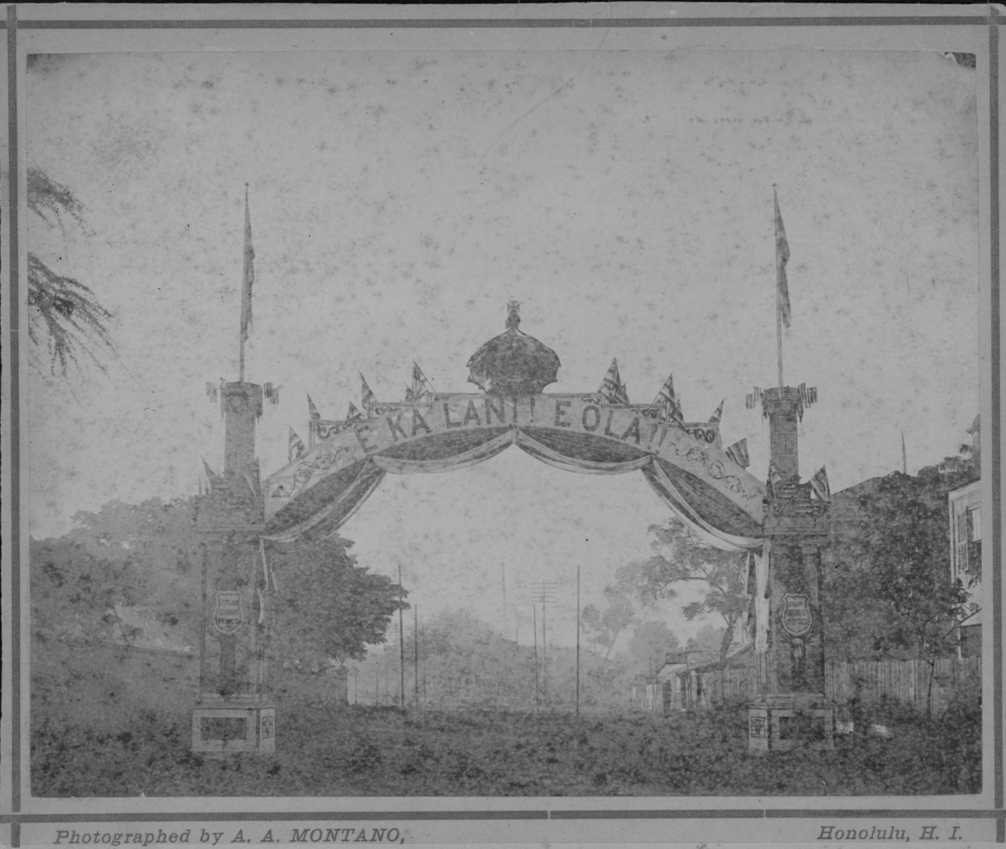
Welcome arch in Honolulu decorated in honor of Kalākaua's return home

The Australia was not expected to arrive in Hawaii until October 31. Plans for Kalākaua's homecoming celebration in Hawaii had begun in August, and included every organized civic and labor union group, as well as the student body of every school on Oahu. The general public was invited to participate in the festivities. Honolulu was in the final stages of preparation on October 29, when the Australia flying Kalākaua's royal flag sailed past Diamond Head, making its way to Honolulu Harbor. As the alert quickly spread across Oahu, a battery of guns began firing along the waterfront from Diamond Head to the port, and a frenzied scramble began to complete the decorations. After 281 days of constant travel, Hawaii's last king was home.

The homecoming celebration went on for days. Officials and the general population of the island crowded the shoreline to cheer their returning monarch. Speeches were made in both English and Hawaiian, and some people stood on rooftops for a glimpse. Floral arrangements permeated the city, welcome-home signs were displayed, and music was everywhere. Along his route to Iolani Palace, the procession passed beneath numerous festooned arches erected for his homecoming. A daytime parade was held in his honor. The palace was opened for the public to personally greet the King. The Honolulu Fire Department and the Poola Association began an evening torchlight parade at a bell tower brightly lit with Chinese lanterns, and proceeded through the streets of downtown Honolulu to the palace.

On Sunday, November 6, houses of worship in Honolulu offered prayers and thanks for the divine protection and safe return of their monarch. The Catholic Cathedral Basilica of Our Lady of Peace in Honolulu conducted the Te Deum hymn of praise. Attended by Kalākaua and Kapiolani, the King's ministry, and much of the Hawaiian government, thanks were given for divine protection during the royal journey. Former missionary Rev. Sereno E. Bishop of the Fort Street Church praised the King's historic journey, but condemned the Hawaiian culture for its "decrepit paganism" and "bestialities of the hula hula". Kalākaua and Kapiolani attended the services at the Anglican Saint Andrew's Cathedral as private individuals, to hear a sermon on the Parable of the talents or minas based on the Gospel of Luke 19:13, "And he called his ten servants and delivered them ten pounds, and said unto them, 'Make use of it till I come.'"

== The rumor mill ==
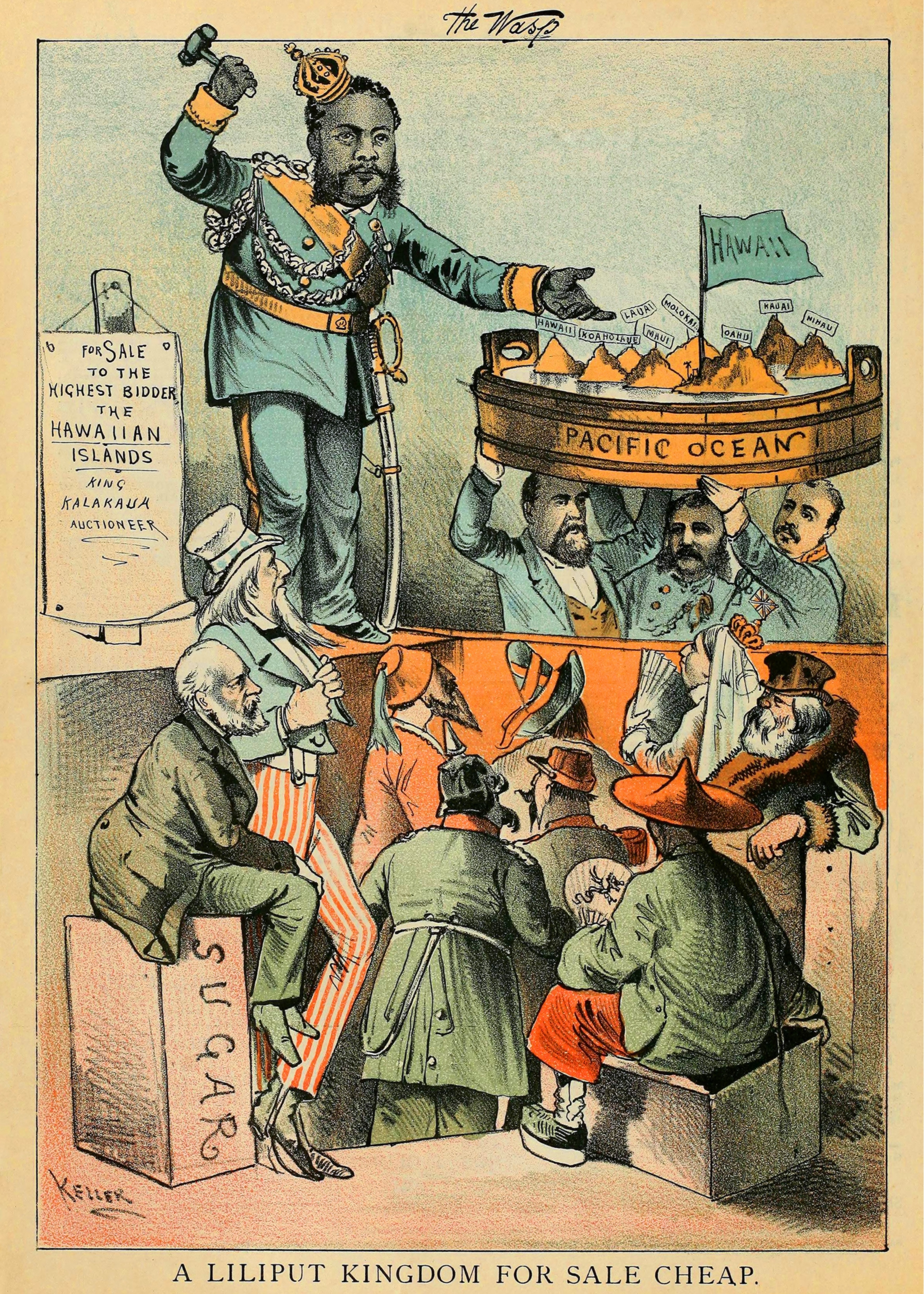
A Liliput Kingdom For Sale Cheap, 1881 political cartoon from The Wasp by G. F. Keller. Depicted: King Kalākaua auctioning the Hawaiian Islands off to the highest bidder

While the King was in California on January 31, the Straits Times of Singapore published a story that Kalākaua already had a representative in Germany finalizing the sale of the kingdom. In April, Secretary of State James G. Blaine was made aware of various rumors that Kalākaua wanted to sell the kingdom to a nation other than the United States, and repeated them to Garfield, who in turn shared them in a letter to one of his friends. In an attempt to protect the interests of the United States, Blaine made it clear to British diplomat Edward Thornton that priority on annexation belonged to the United States. Thornton filed a report with his government, sending a copy to Honolulu's British consul Wodehouse who shared it with Queen Dowager Emma, Princess Likelike, her husband Archibald Scott Cleghorn, Liliʻuokalani, and her husband John Owen Dominis. Although troubled by the rumors and by Blaine's stance on annexation, none of them had any knowledge of the situation and so forwarded the report to Kalākaua.

When the king was visiting England on July 15, the Sacramento Daily Record-Union reprinted a defensive July 14 editorial in The New York Times stating the rumor as fact that Kalākaua was circumnavigating the world in hopes of finding a buyer for the islands: "…Virtually, the United States has a mortgage upon the Sandwich Islands… we have a monopoly of trade of the islands, both as imports and exports…". The trade monopoly referred to was Article IV of the Reciprocity Treaty of 1875, which prevented Hawaii from making a like treaty with any other nation. The editorial stated that any act of acquiring the Hawaiian Islands would be viewed by the United States government as an unfriendly act.

The New York Tribune quoted Armstrong's response that the rumors were "frivolous and utterly false". Immediately below the quote from Armstrong was a different twist on the rumor from San Francisco, also dated July 16, and printed as fact. Sourced to "a number of the most prominent planters and merchants from the Sandwich Islands", it alleged a scheme by the king and Celso Caesar Moreno to import 1,000,000 Chinese men (but no women), conferring instant citizenship upon them, and reaping a $7 per head tax. The 1878 census population count for the entire kingdom had been only 57,985. As the tale went, Kalākaua would then hand the deed to the islands over to the Chinese government. The slant on that story was that Kalākaua's tour was his way of getting out of town after the plan backfired when vetoed by the Hawaiian government.

Upon their return trip to New York, The Sun newspaper quoted Judd about the rumor of the Hawaiian Islands being for sale: "…there is no truth in it whatsoever. It is perfectly absurd." Dismissing the issue of possible annexation, Judd pinpointed the source as coming from England: "This was thought to be such a serious matter that the British government sent two men of war to Honolulu."

== Aftermath ==
=== Immigration ===
Minister of the Interior Henry A. P. Carter and Abraham Hoffnung were sent to Portugal in December 1881 to negotiate immigration details, signing a provisional convention on May 5, 1882. The steamship Monarch arrived in Honolulu on June 9, 1882, carrying 859 Portuguese immigrants, 458 of whom were women and children.

The United States passed the Chinese Exclusion Act in 1882 to deal with what was believed to be an excess of Chinese labor-class immigrants, in particular in California. Many who were already in the United States, or were en route, went to Hawaii, and the islands were flooded with Chinese men. In 1883, between March and May, 3,400 Chinese male laborers arrived in Hawaii. The Hawaiian legislature then restricted immigration of Chinese men to 2,400 per year. Between 1878 and 1884, the population of Chinese laborers in Hawaii tripled.

The first 943 contract laborers from Japan after Kalākaua's visit arrived February 8, 1885. Included in that influx were 159 women and 108 children. The Pacific Commercial Advertiser credited Kalākaua, through his efforts, influence, and "genial character", as being the major factor in the new labor force. In 1985, a bronze statue of Kalākaua was donated to the City and County of Honolulu to commemorate the 100-year anniversary of the arrival of the first Japanese laborers after the king's visit to Japan. It was commissioned by the Oahu Kanyaku Imin Centennial Committee on behalf of the Japanese-American community of Hawaii. The statue is located at the corner of Kalakaua and Kapiolani avenues in Waikiki.

Armstrong's report was dismissive of any possibility of immigration from India, specifically East India. Based on their caste system, he stated that those who would emigrate would be "the ignorant and those with the least moral and intellectual power". He was repulsed by the Hindu and Muslim faiths. Among women immigrants from India, Armstrong believed, would be "single women who have gone astray", of insufficient moral character for Hawaii. An editorial in the December 17, 1881 issue of The Pacific Commercial Advertiser rebuked Armstrong's analysis of the Indian population. As a followup to goodwill generated by Kalākaua's visit, Curtis P. Iaukea was dispatched to India and England in later years to explore the possibility of Indian immigration for sugar plantation labor.

In 1904, 23 years after the voyage, Armstrong published Around the World with a King, his daily journal of the trip. This publication has been criticized for errors, inconsistencies and Armstrong's satirical writing style.

=== Kalākaua ===
Not everybody was enthusiastic about Kalākaua's journey. In Hawaii's Story, Liliʻuokalani defended her brother's efforts against those who she felt "grossly misjudged and even slandered" him. She gave no names, but said there were those who believed, or wanted to persuade others to believe, that Kalākaua was using labor immigration as a cover story to gratify his selfish desire to see the world.

The 1881 year-end retrospective of the Pacific Commercial Advertiser was focused on Kalākaua's journey. The newspaper took a wait-and-see attitude about what the impact of the tour would be, but looked optimistically towards the kingdom having a more secure future as an independent nation. It gave much credit to Liliʻuokalani for rising to the occasion as a capable ruler who gained respect for her performance as temporary Regent. Kalākaua was acknowledged as having brought Hawaii to the forefront of the world's attention. He was praised for his personal qualities of leadership and personality, as well as for his positive interaction with global leaders. A smaller section in same day's newspaper noted that since the journey, there had been a global increase of literary publications pertaining to Hawaii.

Thrum's Hawaiian Almanac and Annual for 1883 reported Kalākaua's tour expense appropriated by the government as $22,500, although his personal correspondence indicates he exceeded that early on, and exact tallies of the trip are not known. Any non-government private expenses or debts would not necessarily have become public. In a letter to Liliʻuokalani in June, the king stated they were already in danger of running out of funds to complete the trip, and that money was owed to Italy for the education of the young men who had been entrusted to Moreno. The many awards and decorations he bestowed during the trip cost the kingdom more money.

The elaborate style of European monarchies left a favorable impression on Kalākaua. Construction on Iolani Palace had begun in 1879, and was ongoing when Kalākaua was touring the world, with an appropriation from the legislature of $80,000. Even though it was not fully completed until December 1882, the king was living there prior to his departure on his world tour. (Note: Liliʻuokalani, Hawaii's Story: "In the early part of the month of January, 1881, a message through the telephone reached me at my private residence at Washington Place, that my presence was required immediately at Iolani Palace.") The influence of European palaces was reflected in the interior design and expensive furnishings. The final cost was $343,595. Immediately upon completion, the king invited all 120 members of Lodge Le Progres de L'Oceanie to the palace for a lodge meeting.

Electric lighting did not come to Honolulu for another 3 1/2 years, when Iolani Palace led the way with the first electric lights in the kingdom. The monarchy invited the public to attend the first-night lighting ceremonies, and 5,000 people showed up. The Royal Hawaiian Band entertained, refreshments were served, and the king on horseback paraded his troops around the grounds.

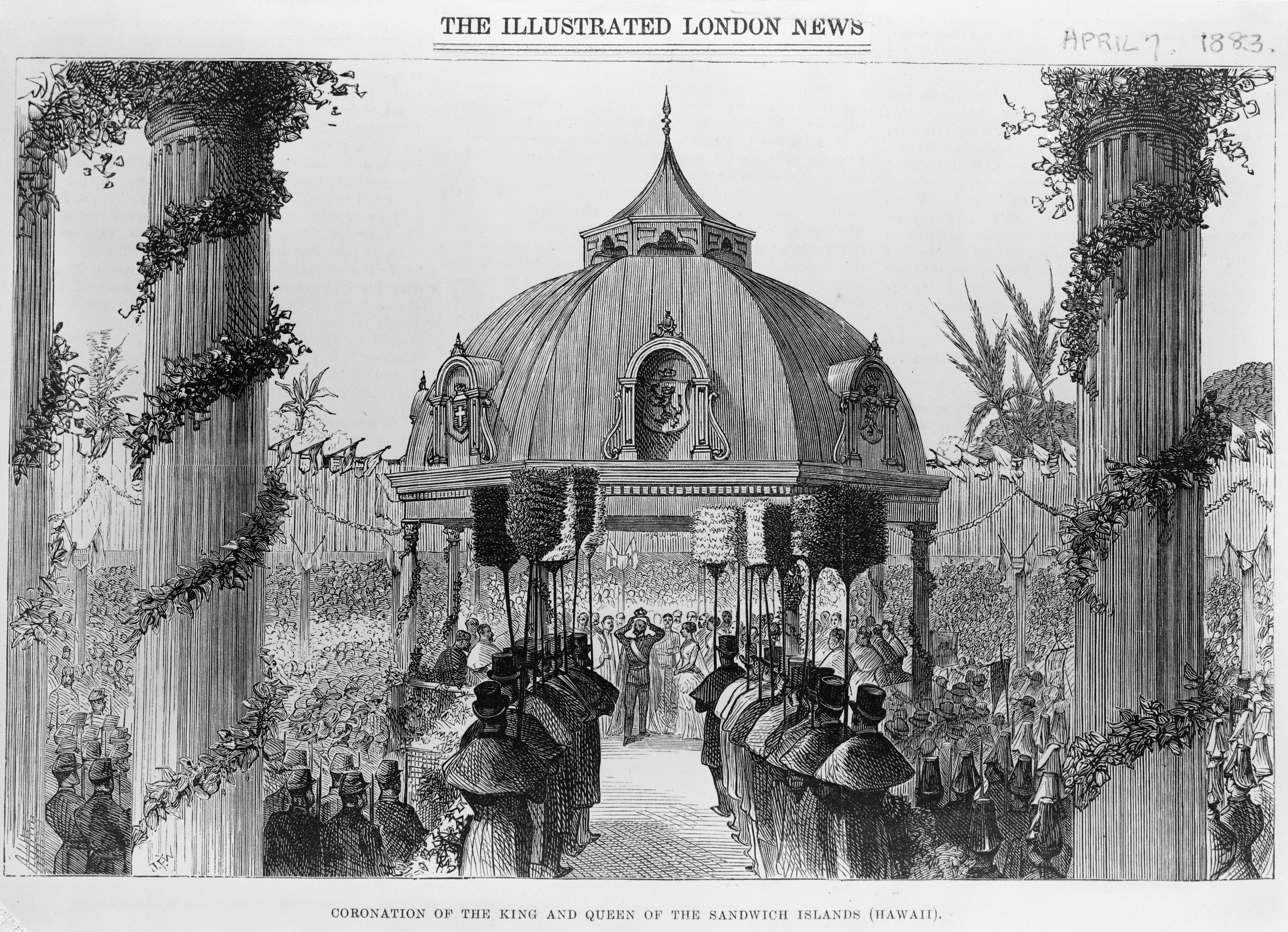
The Illustrated London News engraving of Kalākaua's coronation

His expenditures in trying to remold Hawaii's monarchy into the European model added to the public debt, helping to increase the kingdom's expenditures on the monarchy by 50%. Kalākaua decided to have the coronation he had previously been denied due to the political climate when he was elected. On the 1883 anniversary of his 9th year in office, an elaborate public coronation ceremony was held at expenses exceeding $50,000. Kalākaua crowned himself. In 1886, Kalākaua's two-week 50th birthday Jubilee added more expense, reported by Harper's Weekly to be $75,000.

These expenses were not the sole cause of the 1887 Constitution of the Hawaiian Kingdom, which Kalākaua was forced to sign, but representative of a pattern of excessive spending and grand schemes, under the helm of Walter Murray Gibson, that did lead to it. Gibson was appointed Minister of Foreign Affairs for two non-consecutive terms, on May 20, 1882, and again on October 13, 1886. He became Minister of the Interior and Prime Minister of Hawaii on June 30, 1886. Gibson encouraged and approved the king's excessive expenditures, and is thought to have been the driving force behind some of them, not the least of which was the $100,000 purchase of a state steamboat for travel to the Kingdom of Samoa as part of Kalākaua's plan to form a Polynesian Confederation.

== See also ==
- Bibliography of Kalākaua
- Kalākaua's 1874–75 state visit to the United States
