= List of palaces in Bangkok =

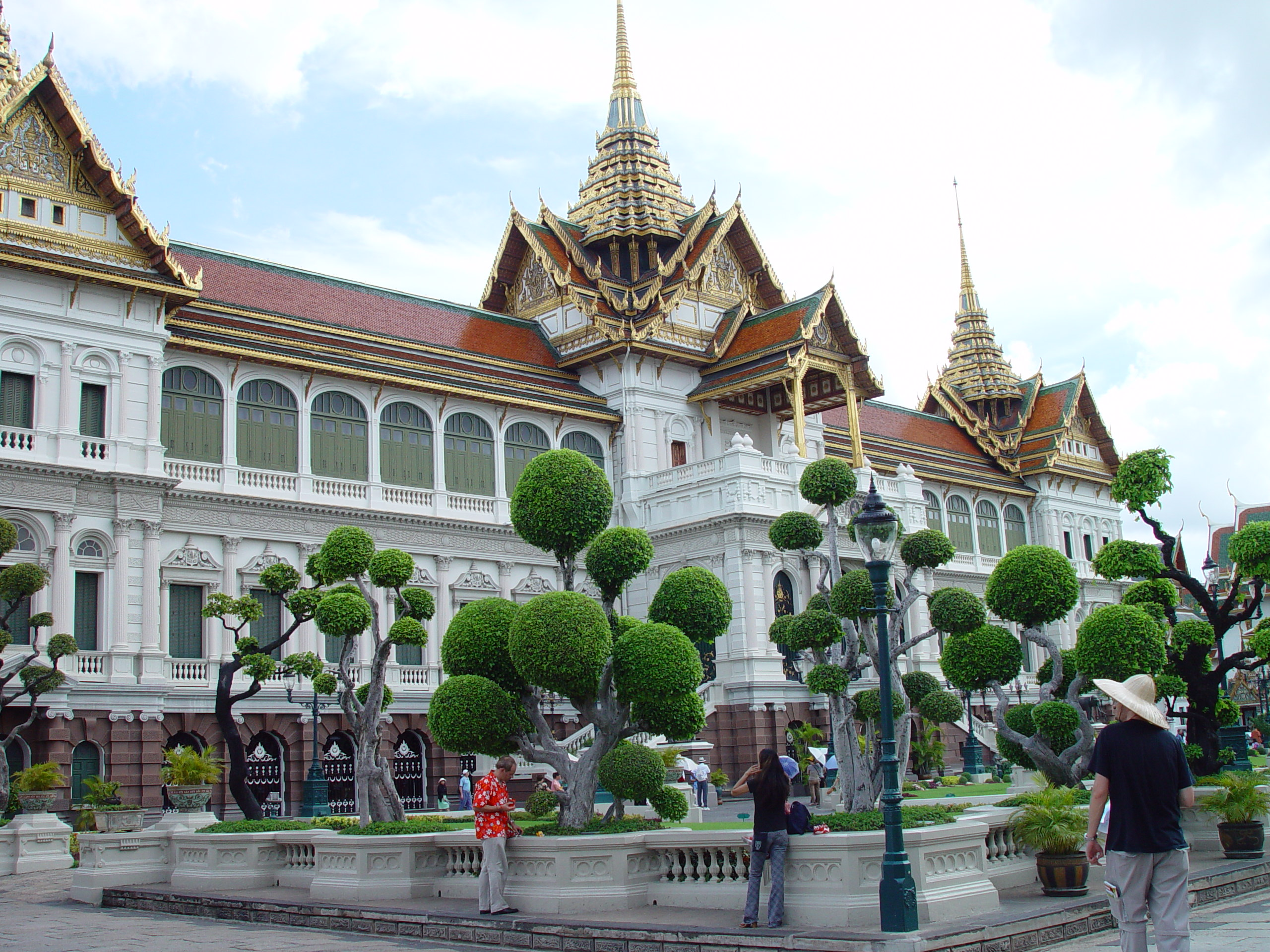
Chakri Mahaprasad Hall at the Grand Palace

This is a list of royal residences in Bangkok.

== Current royal residences in Bangkok ==
- Grand Palace, – The primary and official residence of the king.
- Dusit Palace (1897–1901) – Commissioned by King Chulalongkorn as an alternative primary residence to the Grand Palace. Apart from Chitralada Villa, now serves mainly as a museum and in certain state functions.
  - Amphorn Sathan Residential Hall (1906) – Currently the residence of King Vajiralongkorn.
  - Chitralada Royal Villa (1913) – Part of the Dusit Palace (see below), it is the formerly de facto primary residence of the late King Bhumibol Adulyadej and the late Queen Sirikit.
  - Vimanmek Mansion – Main residential building of the Dusit Palace complex; now serves as a museum.
- Sa Pathum Palace, Bangkok – Currently the residence of Princess Maha Chakri Sirindhorn.
- Sukhothai Palace (1918) – Currently the residence and Princess Sirivannavari Nariratana.
- Le Dix Palace (1980) – Former residence of the late Princess Galyani Vadhana.
- Ruen Rudee Palace – Former residence of the late Princess Bejaratana.

== Former royal residences in Bangkok ==
- Phra Racha Wang Derm (Thonburi Palace) (1768) – Royal palace of King Taksin; now site of the Royal Thai Navy headquarters.
- Front Palace (Phra Ratchawang Bowon Sathan Mongkhon), Bangkok (1782–85) – Residence of the holder of the same title, who was also known as the uparaja or "vice king". Its grounds are now the site of the Bangkok National Museum, Thammasat University, Bunditpatanasilpa Institute, the National Theatre and the Office of the Council of State.
- Rear Palace (Phra Ratchawang Bowon Sathan Phimuk) (built in the reign of King Rama I) – Residence of the "Rear Palace" or second vice king. It is now the site of Siriraj Hospital.
- Tha Phra Palace (1782) – Served as the residence of Prince Chetsadabodin (Rama III) and Prince Narisara Nuvadtivongs, among others; now the main campus of Silpakorn University.
- Nantha Utthayan Palace – Built in the reign of King Mongkut, its location is now occupied by the Royal Thai Navy.
- Pathum Wan Palace (later known as Phetchabun Palace) – Built in the reign of King Mongkut as a country residence; later given to Prince Chudadhuj Dharadilok. Its location is now the site of Central World.
- Saranrom Palace (construction began 1866) – Served as temporary residence for some princes and as lodging for royal guests. It is now the site of the Meseum of the Ministry of Foreign Affairs and Saranrom Park.
- Buraphaphirom Palace, Bangkok – Rebuilt in 1875 to serve as the residence of Prince Bhanurangsi Savangwongse, the palace has since been demolished, and its former grounds are now a commercial area known as Wang Burapha.
- Windsor Palace, Bangkok – Built in the reign of King Chulalongkorn to serve as the residence of Crown Prince Vajirunhis. The palace became part of Chulalongkorn University after the prince's death; its former location is now the site of the National Stadium.
- Bang Khun Phrom Palace (1899) – Former residence of Prince Paribatra Sukhumbandh; now a museum of the Bank of Thailand.
- Paruskavan Palace (1904–05) – Former residence of Chakrabongse Bhuvanath; now the headquarters of the Metropolitan Police Bureau and the National Intelligence Agency.
- Ladawan Palace (1906) – Former residence of Prince Yugala Dighambara; now the site of the Crown Property Bureau.
- Thewet Palace – Residence of Prince Kitiyakara Voralaksana and his descendants.
- Phaya Thai Palace (1909) – Served as country residence of King Chulalongkorn and Queen Saovabha Phongsri, and later King Vajiravudh. Converted to a hotel, then a hospital; now within the grounds of Phramongkutklao Hospital and College of Medicine.
- Chakrabongse Palace (1909–1910) – former residence of Prince Chakrabongse Bhuvanath; now the site of Chakrabongse Villas, a private resort, and the headquarters of Green World Foundation and River Books.
- Chan Kasem Palace (1909–11) – Built as the residence of then-Crown Prince Vajiravudh, the prince succeeded his father before the palace's completion. It is now the site of the Ministry of Education.
- Varadis Palace (1911) – Former residence of Prince Damrong Rajanubhab; now a museum.
- Thewawet Palace (1914) – Former residence of Prince Devawongse Varopakarn; now a museum of the Bank of Thailand.
- Suan Pakkad Palace (1952) – Former residence of Prince Chumbhotbongs Paribatra; now a museum.

== See also ==
- List of Thai royal residences
