= Schmelz (Vienna) =

Coordinates: 48.2033°N 16.3203°E

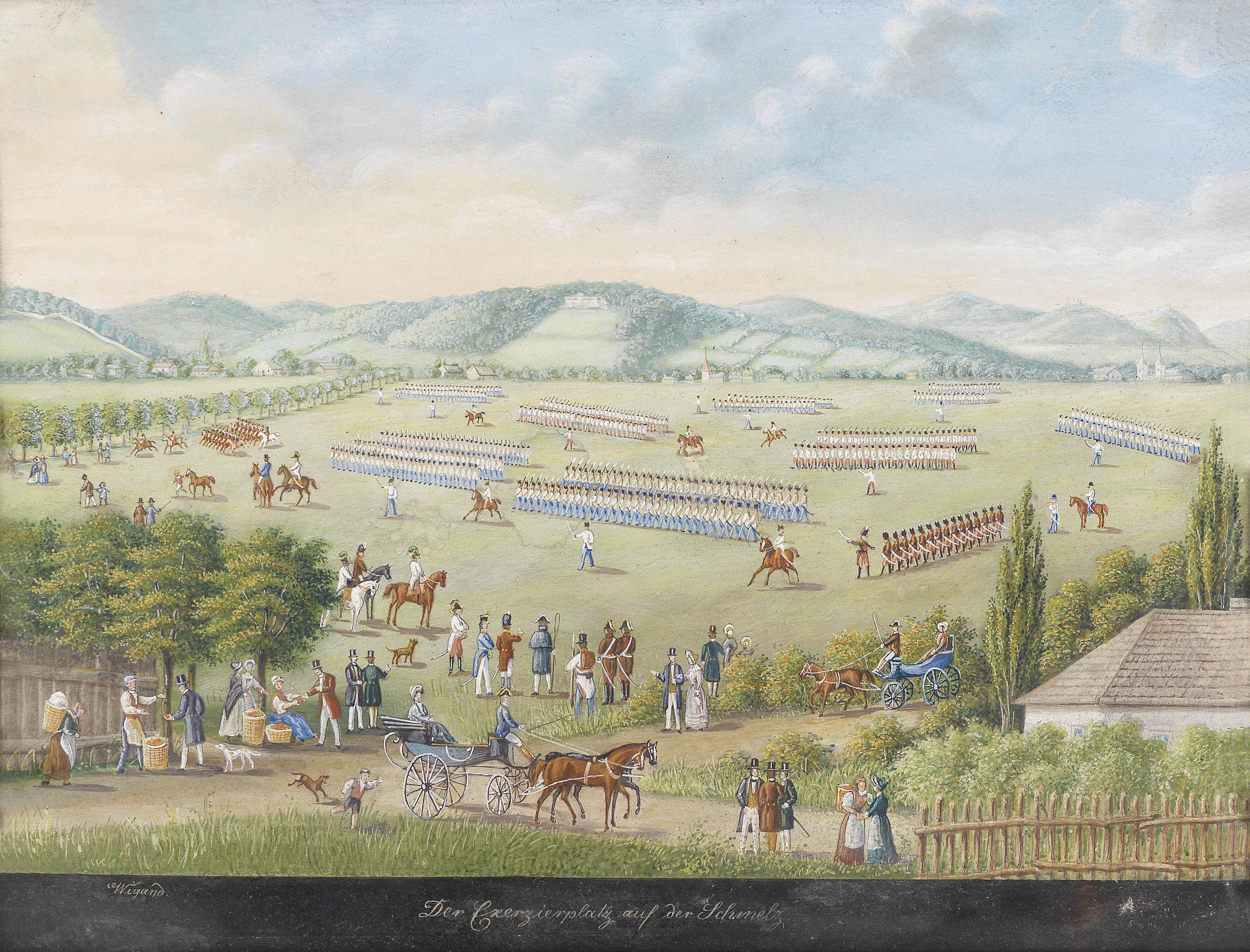
Der Exerzierplatz auf der Schmelz by Balthasar Wigand

Schmelz is a former parade and exercise ground located in Rudolfsheim-Fünfhaus in central Vienna, Austria. It also contained the first football field of SK Rapid Wien between 1899 and 1903.
