= Tad Chomphu Reservoir =

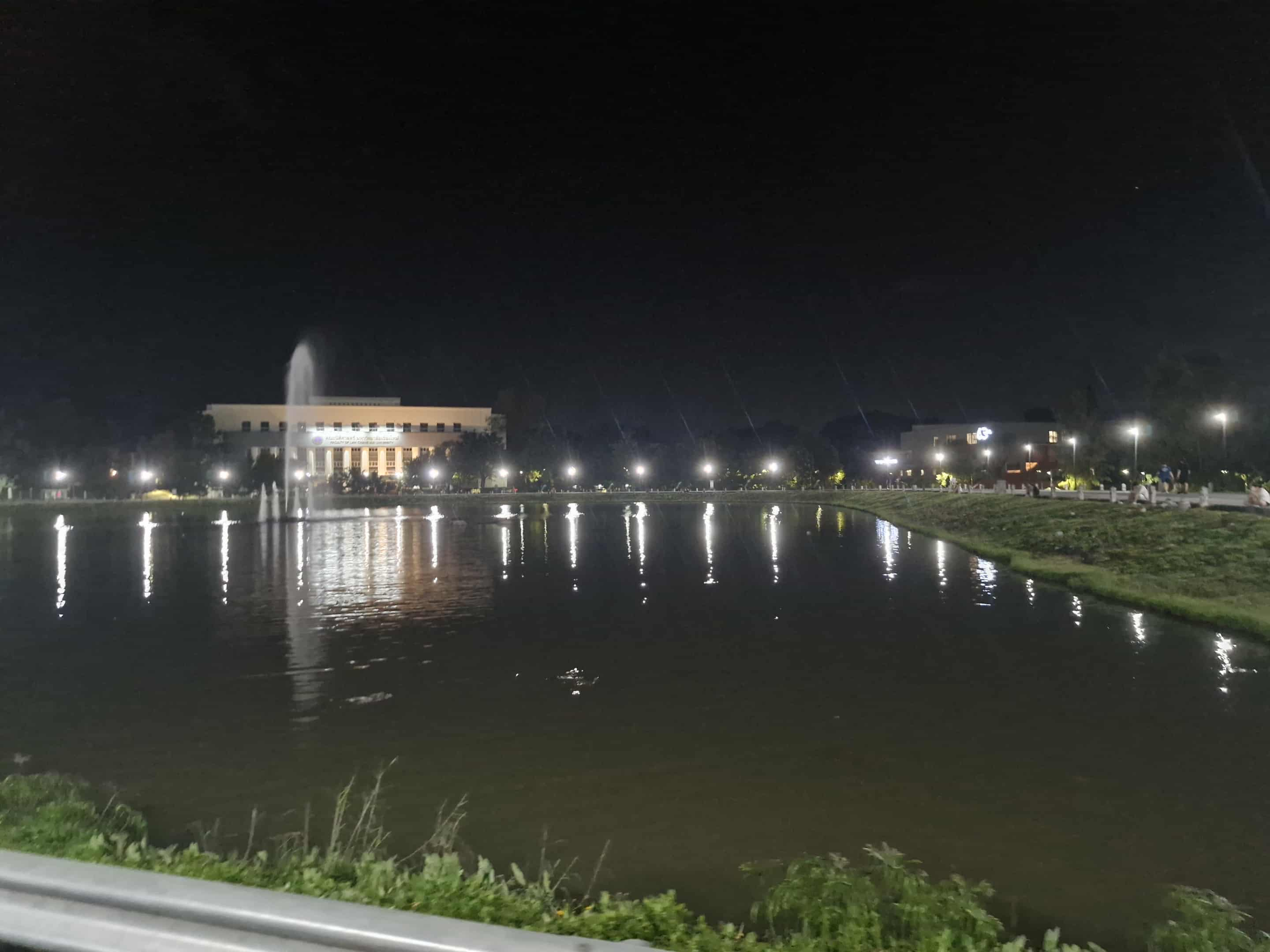
- View of Tad Chomphu Reservoir at Chiang Mai University with The Faculty of Law in the background

- Location in Thailand
- Location: Chiang Mai University, Mueang Chiang Mai District, Chiang Mai Province, Thailand
- Coordinates: 18°47′50″N 98°56′50″E
- Type: Reservoir
- Primary inflows: Tad Chomphu stream
- Basin countries: Thailand
- Built: 2016
- Surface area: 0.03 km^{2} (0.012 sq mi)
- Water volume: 100,000 m^{3} (3,500,000 cu ft)
- Surface elevation: 310 m (1,020 ft)

Tad Chomphu Reservoir (Thai: อ่างเก็บน้ำตาดชมพู) is an artificial reservoir located within the campus of Chiang Mai University in Mueang Chiang Mai district, Chiang Mai province, northern Thailand. It is situated in front of the Faculty of Law and lies close to the foothills of Doi Suthep and the adjacent Chiang Mai Zoo.

The reservoir was constructed in 2016 as an additional water-storage facility for the university, supplementing the older Ang Kaew Reservoir on campus. During its construction period, CMU also incorporated a program to conserve over 300 large trees around the reservoir site as part of an effort to create a "green lung" for the city of Chiang Mai. The path surrounding the reservoir is approximately 725 meters long, and the total area covers about 25 rai (4 hectares). The reservoir has an estimated storage capacity of 100,000 cubic meters and is supplied by water from the Tad Chomphu stream, which flows down from Doi Suthep. The area is developed for jogging, walking, and relaxing, so it serves both functional and recreational purposes. Its main function is to help manage the university's water supply and stormwater runoff.

Tad Chomphu lies adjacent to the foot of Doi Suthep, with a setting that provides scenic mountain views. The path around the reservoir is approximately 800 meters in length, with gentle elevation changes corresponding to the terrain. The reservoir is a popular recreational area on the campus, frequented by students and visitors. Its 800-meter loop is commonly used for jogging, walking, and relaxation amid natural surroundings.
