= Kanpassorn Suriyasangpetch =

- Born: 1988 (age 37–38); Bangkok, Thailand
- Other name: Eix
- Education: Chiang Mai University
- Known for: Dentistry, mental health, tech start-up

Kanpassorn Suriyasangpetch (Thai: กัญจน์ภัสสร สุริยาแสงเพ็ชร์), nicknamed Eix (อิ๊ก), is a dentist and tech entrepreneur, founder of Ooca, an app to help those suffering from mental illness. She was listed on the BBC 100 Women for 2018.

== Background ==
Prior to founding Ooca, Suriyasangpetch served as a military dentist in the Royal Thai Army.

== Company ==
Suriyasangpetch founded the smartphone app Ooca in 2017 to connect Thai patients with psychiatric help remotely, through video chats on mobile devices. She claims it served a gap in mental health care, describing that there are roughly 40x fewer psychologists available to those living in Thailand than in other parts of the developed world.

== Awards and honors ==
- 2018 BBC World 100 Women
- 2017 - World Summit Award for Ooca
