= Lampang Hospital =

Hospital in Lampang, Thailand

Lampang Hospital โรงพยาบาลลำปาง
- The Ministry of Public Health Health District 1

Geography
- Location: 280 Phahon Yothin Road, Hua Wiang Subdistrict, Mueang Lampang District, Lampang 52000, Thailand
- Coordinates: 18.286464°N 99.506049°E

Organisation
- Type: Regional
- Affiliated university: Faculty of Medicine, Chiang Mai University

Services
- Beds: 743

History
- Opened: 1930

Links
- Website: www.lph.go.th/lpweb/
- Lists: Hospitals in Thailand

Lampang Hospital (Thai: โรงพยาบาลลำปาง) is the main hospital of Lampang Province, Thailand and is classified under the Ministry of Public Health as a regional hospital. It is the tertiary-care transfer hospital for patients in Phrae and Nan Provinces. It has a CPIRD Medical Education Center which trains doctors for the Faculty of Medicine of Chiang Mai University.

== History ==
Lampang Hospital was constructed in 1930 and had a major renovation according to the Fourth National Economic and Social Development Plan of 1977–1981, of which Lampang was one of 15 provincial hospitals to be made into a regional hospital. It became affiliated with the Collaborative Project to Increase Rural Doctors (CPIRD) program with Chiang Mai University on 10 May 2000.

The hospital was damaged during the 2025 Myanmar earthquake.

== See also ==
- Healthcare in Thailand
- Hospitals in Thailand
- List of hospitals in Thailand
