= Ang Kaew Reservoir =

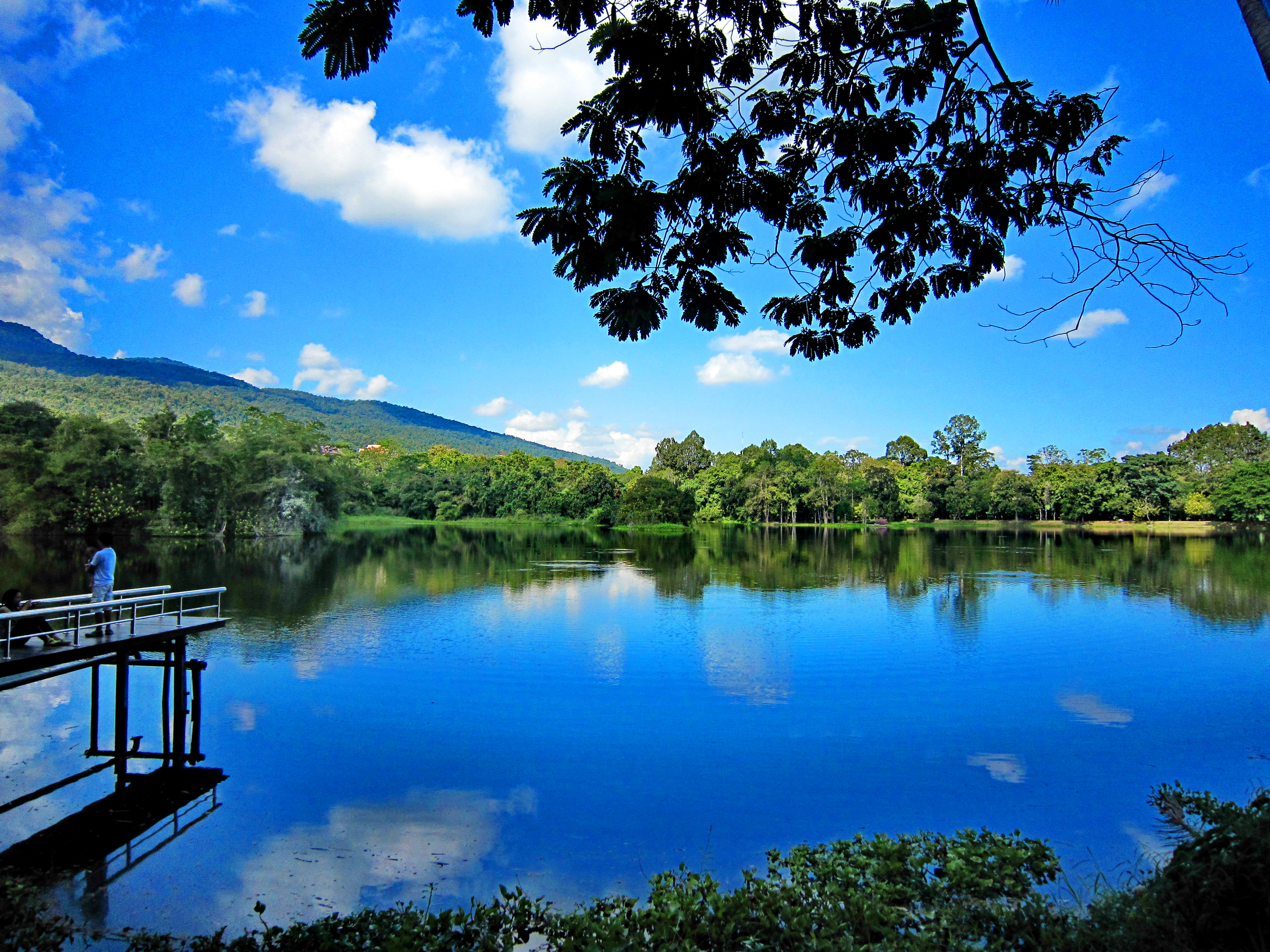
- View of Ang Kaew Reservoir with Doi Suthep in the background

- Location in Thailand
- Location: Chiang Mai University, Mueang Chiang Mai District, Chiang Mai Province, Thailand
- Coordinates: 18°48′23.8″N 98°57′6.5″E
- Type: Reservoir
- Primary inflows: Streams from Doi Suthep
- Primary outflows: Huai Kaew stream
- Basin countries: Thailand
- Built: 1962
- Surface area: 0.12 km^{2} (0.046 sq mi)
- Water volume: 400,000 m^{3} (14,000,000 cu ft)
- Surface elevation: 310 m (1,020 ft)

Ang Kaew Reservoir (Thai: อ่างแก้ว) is an artificial lake located within the campus of Chiang Mai University (CMU) in Chiang Mai Province, northern Thailand. It lies at the foot of Doi Suthep mountain and is known for its scenic beauty. The reservoir is a popular recreational spot for students and tourists.

== History ==
Ang Kaew was constructed in 1962, two years before the university's official opening in 1964, as part of the campus’s water management and landscape design project. The reservoir was intended to collect mountain water flowing down from Doi Suthep for campus use and to provide flood control during the rainy season.

The university's founding committee, headed by Professor Mom Luang Pin Malakul, saw the need for an independent water source and planned the reservoir's construction. Because it was the meeting point of two streams, Huai Kaew and Huai Ku Khao, the location at the foot of Doi Suthep was selected.

Mom Luang Chuchat Kamphu, the former Director-General of the Royal Irrigation Department, and Professor Arun Sorathesn, the supervising engineer for the university's building constructions at the time, were among the engineering and irrigation specialists who reviewed and approved the project. An irrigation engineer named Surat Ratanakitkarnkhol also played a big part in running the waterworks until it was finished. After it was finished, the Royal Irrigation Department gave it the official name Huai Kaew Reservoir. Later, Professor Mom Luang Pin Malakul, a member of the founding committee of Chiang Mai University, renamed it Ang Kaew.

Over time, the reservoir became a popular spot for students and locals alike, especially during sunrise and sunset, when the reflection of Doi Suthep can be seen across its calm waters.

== Geography ==
The reservoir covers an area of about 0.12 square kilometers (12 hectares) and sits at an elevation of roughly 310 meters above sea level. It is supplied by small streams flowing down from Doi Suthep and drains eastward into the Huai Kaew stream, which eventually joins the Ping River. The reservoir has a total storage capacity of around 400,000 cubic meters. Beside the reservoir, there is another smaller one known as the Tat Chomphu Reservoir, which serves as an additional water-storage facility for Chiang Mai University, supplementing Ang Kaew.

A walking and jogging path encircles the lake, making it one of the main recreational areas on the Chiang Mai University campus. The nearby Huay Kaew Arboretum and Chiang Mai Zoo are also within walking distance. The reservoir's surroundings feature abundant vegetation and diverse wildlife, including turtles, insects, and various bird species. A small island in the middle of the lake, known as Bird Island, serves as a nesting site for night herons that gather there annually from July to August.

== Tourism ==
Ang Kaew is one of Chiang Mai's most photographed landmarks and a popular tourist attraction. It attracts joggers, cyclists, and visitors seeking a peaceful setting within the city. The reservoir’s panoramic view of Doi Suthep has become an iconic image frequently featured in Chiang Mai University promotional materials and local tourism campaigns.

== See also ==
- Chiang Mai University
- Doi Suthep
- Huay Kaew Waterfall
- Chiang Mai Zoo
