= Roger A. Beaver =

Welsh entomologist

Roger Anthony Beaver (born 1936) is a biologist who has worked at University College of North Wales, Chiang Mai University, the University of Zambia and the University of the South Pacific. He has published several important papers on Nepenthes infauna, including "Fauna and food webs of pitcher plants in West Malaysia" (1979), "The communities living in Nepenthes pitcher plants: fauna and food webs" (1983), and "Geographical variation in food web structure in Nepenthes pitcher plants" (1985). The species Cryptoxilos beaveri was named in his honour.
