= Faculty of Medicine, Chiang Mai University =

- คณะแพทยศาสตร์ มหาวิทยาลัยเชียงใหม่
- Former names: Faculty of Medicine Nakorn Chiang Mai Hospital, University of Medical Sciences
- Type: Public (non-profit)
- Established: 16 March 1959 (as Faculty of Medicine, University of Medical Sciences)
- Parent institution: Chiang Mai University
- Dean: Assoc. Prof. Narain Chotirosniramit, M.D.
- Location: 110 Inthawarorot Road, Sri Phum Subdistrict Mueang Chiang Mai, Chiang Mai 50200, Thailand; 18.789957°N 98.973212°E
- Colors: Leafy Green
- Website: web.med.cmu.ac.th/index.php/th

The Faculty of Medicine, Chiang Mai University (Thai: คณะแพทยศาสตร์ มหาวิทยาลัยเชียงใหม่) is the third oldest medical school in Thailand located in Mueang Chiang Mai, Chiang Mai and is the first medical school in Thailand to be set up in a regional location outside Bangkok.

== History ==
The need for increased medical personnel in Thailand rose rapidly and the country only had two medical schools at the time which was the Faculty of Medicine Siriraj Hospital and Faculty of Medicine Chulalongkorn Hospital of the University of Medical Sciences (now Mahidol University). Therefore, the University and the Ministry of Public Health proposed the construction of the Faculty of Medicine Nakorn Chiang Mai Hospital which was to be set up to spread medical education to more regional parts of Thailand. This was done in 1954 and in 1956 involved cooperation with United States Overseas Missions (USOM), providing the funding, equipment and technology for the medical school. The organisation of the faculty was approved by the cabinet on 12 December 1956 and construction was ordered by royal decree of King Bhumibol Adulyadej on 28 October 1959.

Chiang Mai University was then founded in 1964 by royal decree and officially opened on 24 January 1965. On 16 March 1965, the Faculty of Medicine was moved from the University of Medical Sciences to Chiang Mai University and so became the Faculty of Medicine, Chiang Mai University.

As of the 2018 academic year, the Faculty of Medicine Chiang Mai University accepted 258 undergraduate students for the Medicine (MD) course.

== Departments ==
- Department of Anaethesiology
- Department of Anatomy
- Department of Biomedical Science
- Department of Community Medicine
- Department of Emergency Medicine
- Department of Family Medicine
- Department of Forensic Medicine
- Department of Internal Medicine
- Department of Obstetrics and Gynaecology
- Department of Ophthalmology
- Department of Orthopaedics
- Department of Otolaryngology
- Department of Parasitology
- Department of Pathology
- Department of Paediatrics
- Department of Pharmacology
- Department of Physical Therapy
- Department of Psychology
- Department of Radiology
- Department of Rehabilitation Medicine
- Department of Surgery

== Main Teaching Hospital ==
- Maharaj Nakorn Chiang Mai Hospital

== Affiliated Teaching Hospitals ==
- Chiangrai Prachanukroh Hospital (CPIRD)
- Lampang Hospital (CPIRD)
- Nakornping Hospital
- Nan Hospital
- Lamphun Hospital
- Chom Thong Hospital

== See also ==
- List of medical schools in Thailand
