= Samruam Singh =

Surasinghsamruam Shimbhanao (Thai: สุรสิงห์สำรวม ฉิมพะเนาว์, RTGS: Surasingsamruam Chimphanao; 1949–1996) pseudonym Samruam Singh, was a Thai author, scholar, and activist.

== Early life and education ==
Surasingh was born in Thonburi, an area of Bangkok. Although he was born in the Bangkok area, his mother moved there from northern Thailand's Lampang Province, and his father came to Thonburi from northeastern Thailand for medical school. At the age of four or five Surasingh moved with his family to his mother's home village in Lampang where his mother sold sweets at the market and his father was a medic. Although Surasingh was educated at one of Lampang's finest private schools, Surasinghsamruam's family was not wealthy; Surasingh sold flowers to pay his living costs. In 1973, Surasingh completed a B.A. in Education from Chiang Mai University.

== Educational career and social activism ==
After completing his B.A. Surasingh placed 2nd in the national civil service exam. He then went on to teach at the southern teacher training college of Nakhon Sri Thammarat. Surasingh proved himself an outstanding teacher, earning a double promotion while in Nakhon Sri Thammarat. In 1975, he took a position teaching at Chiang Mai Teachers College.

Samruam Singh was an award winning author that won the Cho Karaket prize for his short story "The Necklace" and was nominated for Thailand's national book award for another one of his works. His subjects included issues related to rural Thailand. Furthermore, he was an advisor to Thailand's minister of industry.
