= Faculty of Social Sciences, Chiang Mai University =

- คณะสังคมศาสตร์ มหาวิทยาลัยเชียงใหม่
- Established: 1964
- Parent institution: Chiang Mai University
- Dean: Asst. Prof. Wasan Panyagaew
- Students: 1,306 (Update 19 October 2022)
- Location: Chiang Mai, Chiang Mai Province, Thailand
- Colors: Cyan
- Website: www.soc.cmu.ac.th

Faculty of Social Sciences, Chiang Mai University (Thai: คณะสังคมศาสตร์ มหาวิทยาลัยเชียงใหม่) was established together with the university, Faculty of humanities, and Faculty of Science on 18 June 1964. The faculty has arranged undergraduate and graduate (Masters and PhDs) programs in both Thai and international programs.

== History ==
Faculty of Social Sciences, Chiang Mai University is located at the foothill of Doi Suthep, between Suthep and Huay Kaew Road, which is far from Chiang Mai city around 4 kilometers. The cabinet, in 1960, has agreed to the foundation of Chiang Mai University. According to the suggestion of the advisory committee, Faculty of Social Sciences, with only 75 students and 15 lecturers, is one of three faculties which have been established at that time. This faculty was educationally set up as a broad discipline instead of Faculty of Law which could scarcely find qualified personnel in that decade. In the early phase, there were five departments in the faculty including Department of Geography (the first Geography Department in Thailand), Department of Sociology and Anthropology, Department of Economics, Departments of Accountancy and Business Administration, and Department of Political Science. Several departments, however, have been departed from Faculty of Social Sciences as new faculties in last two decades. Faculty of Social Sciences, Chiang Mai University, nowadays, composes of four departments including Geography, Sociology and Anthropology, Women's Studies, and Social Sciences and Development.

== Curriculum and Programs ==
The faculty, currently, offers various bachelor, master, and doctoral degrees in both Thai and international programs as detailed in the below table.

Bachelor's degree	Master's degree	Doctoral Degree
Bachelor of Science (B.S.): Geography; Bachelor of Arts (B.A.): Sociology and Anthropology; ASEAN Studies; Social Science and Sustainable Development (International Program)	Master of Science (M.S.): Geography and Geoinformatics; Master of Arts (M.A.): Sociology and Anthropology; Social Science; Social Science (International Program); Political Economy (Multidisciplinary Program)	Doctor of Philosophy (Ph.D.): Geography (International Program); Sociology and Anthropology; Social Science (International Program); Women's and Gender Studies (International Program)

== Center of Research and Academic Services ==
The Center of Research and Academic Services collaborates with various centers and projects under faculty administration to support research, academic services, international exchange programs, and personnel activities. The faculty sets five research clusters based on research expertise, including 1) environment-disaster, forecasting technology and spatial/human impacts; 2) development/social changes, city, food security, health, labour and migration; 3) cultural studies, religion, ethnicity and Lanna studies; 4) women's and gender studies; and 5) regional studies (China, India, ASEAN, border studies, and transnationalism).

- Geoinformatics and Space Technology Centre Northern Region (GISTNORTH)
- Regional Center for Climate and Environmental Studies (RCCES)
- Regional Center for Social Science and Sustainable Development (RCSD)
- Center for Ethnic Studies and Development (CESD)
- Women's Studies Center (WSC)
- China-Southeast Asia Studies Center (CSC)
- Centre for Cultural Studies and Contemporary City (CCSC)

The faculty also promotes the dissemination of academic works through various channels, including the Journal of Social Sciences, the Thai Feminist Review: Stance, the Political Economy Articles Network, online publications, and the Faculty of Social Sciences' online book distribution system.

== Sources ==
- Faculty of Social Sciences, CMU
- Department of Geography
- Department of Sociology and Anthropology
- Department of Women's Studies
- Department of Social Sciences and Development
- Center for Research and Academic Services
- Regional Center for Social Science and Sustainable Development, Chiang Mai University (RCSD)
- Doctor of Philosophy Program in Social Science
