= Maharaj Nakorn Chiang Mai Hospital =

Maharaj Nakorn Chiang Mai Hospital โรงพยาบาลมหาราชนครเชียงใหม่
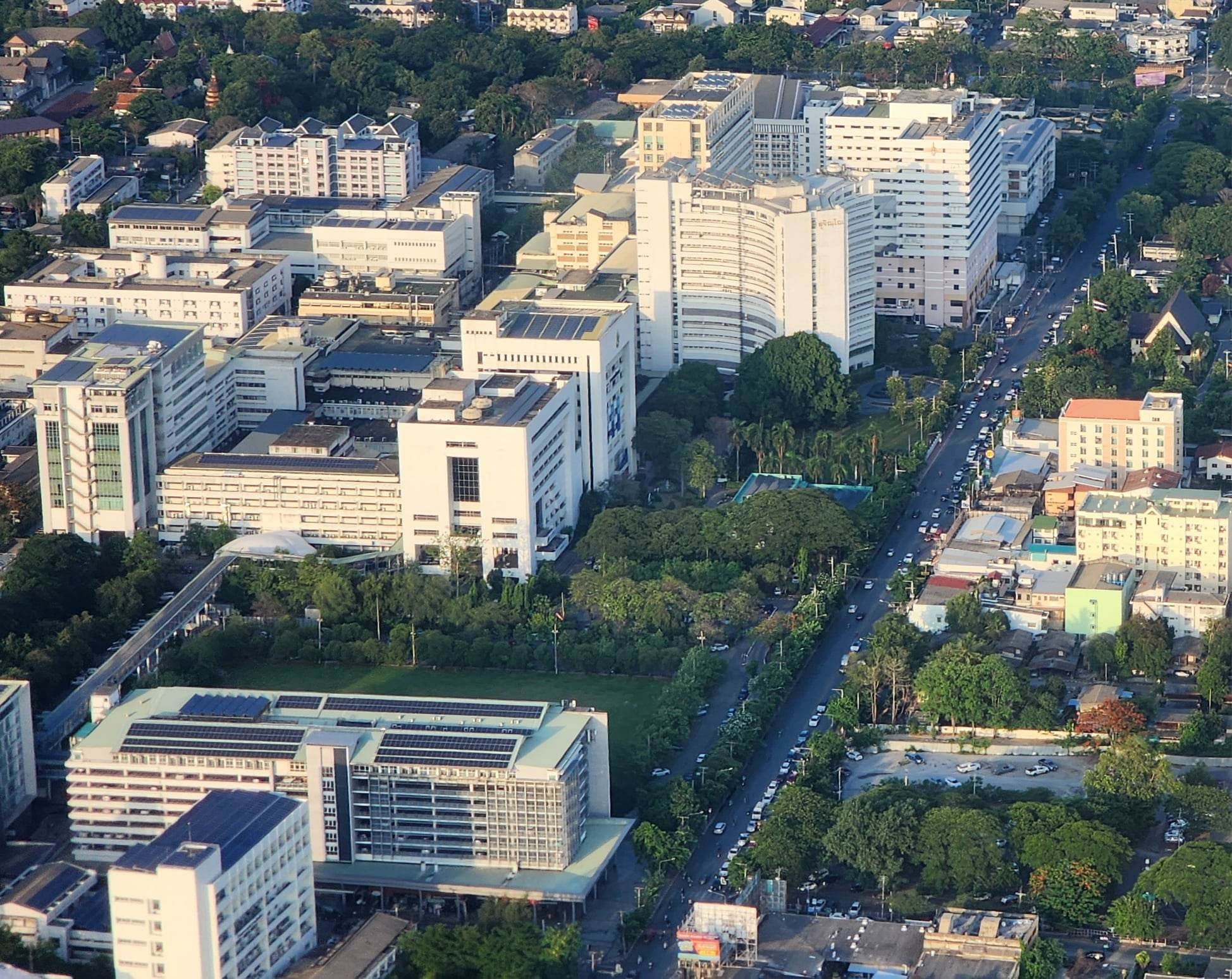

Geography
- Location: 110 Inthawarorot Road, Sri Phum Subdistrict Mueang Chiang Mai District, Chiang Mai 50200, Thailand
- Coordinates: 18.790287°N 98.974073°E

Organisation
- Type: Teaching
- Affiliated university: Faculty of Medicine, Chiang Mai University

Services
- Beds: 1400

History
- Former name: Nakorn Chiang Mai Hospital
- Founded: 24 June 1941

Links
- Website: web.med.cmu.ac.th/index.php/th/med-suandok
- Lists: Hospitals in Thailand

Maharaj Nakorn Chiang Mai Hospital (Thai: โรงพยาบาลมหาราชนครเชียงใหม่) is a university teaching hospital, affiliated to the Faculty of Medicine of Chiang Mai University, located in Mueang Chiang Mai District, Chiang Mai Province. It is a hospital capable of super tertiary care and is the first university hospital in Northern Thailand, and the first to be located outside Bangkok. The hospital is known as 'Suandok Hospital' locally, due to its close proximity to Suan Dok Gate.

== History ==
In 1939, a new hospital was planned to be built near Suan Dok Gate, in order to increase provision of healthcare in Chiang Mai and spread patients to other facilities as the original 'Chiang Mai Hospital' had a capacity of only 11 beds and was unsuitable for expansion. As construction was completed in 1941, there was a lack of medical personnel available, so operations were transferred from Chiang Mai City Municipality to the Ministry of Public Health (MOPH) and the hospital was opened on 24 June 1941 as 'Nakorn Chiang Mai Hospital'. The hospital then underwent extensive expansion using financial aid from donations of local citizens and businesses, including aid from the United States government under the presidency of Harry S. Truman, as well as aid from the World Health Organisation. The funding contributed to the construction of X-ray imaging facilities, operating theaters and the pediatric ward of the hospital. As a university hospital, it is generally regarded as one of the final referral centers for complicated and rare diseases from all hospitals, especially within Northern Thailand.

The first regional medical school was then approved by the cabinet in 1956 and set up by the University of Medical Sciences (now Mahidol University) as the Faculty of Medicine Nakorn Chiang Mai Hospital and teaching was done at the hospital. On 1 January 1959, operations were transferred from the MOPH to the University of Medical Sciences. Chiang Mai University was then founded in 1964 by royal decree and operations were transferred to Chiang Mai University.

On 25 July 1983, the hospital was renamed 'Maharaj Nakorn Chiang Mai Hospital', in honour of King Bhumibol Adulyadej.

On 28 March 2025 the hospital was damaged during the 2025 Myanmar earthquake.

== See also ==
- Healthcare in Thailand
- Hospitals in Thailand
- List of hospitals in Thailand
