= Chiangrai Prachanukroh Hospital =

Hospital in Chiang Rai, Thailand

Chiangrai Prachanukroh Hospital โรงพยาบาลเชียงรายประชานุเคราะห์
- The Ministry of Public Health Health District 1

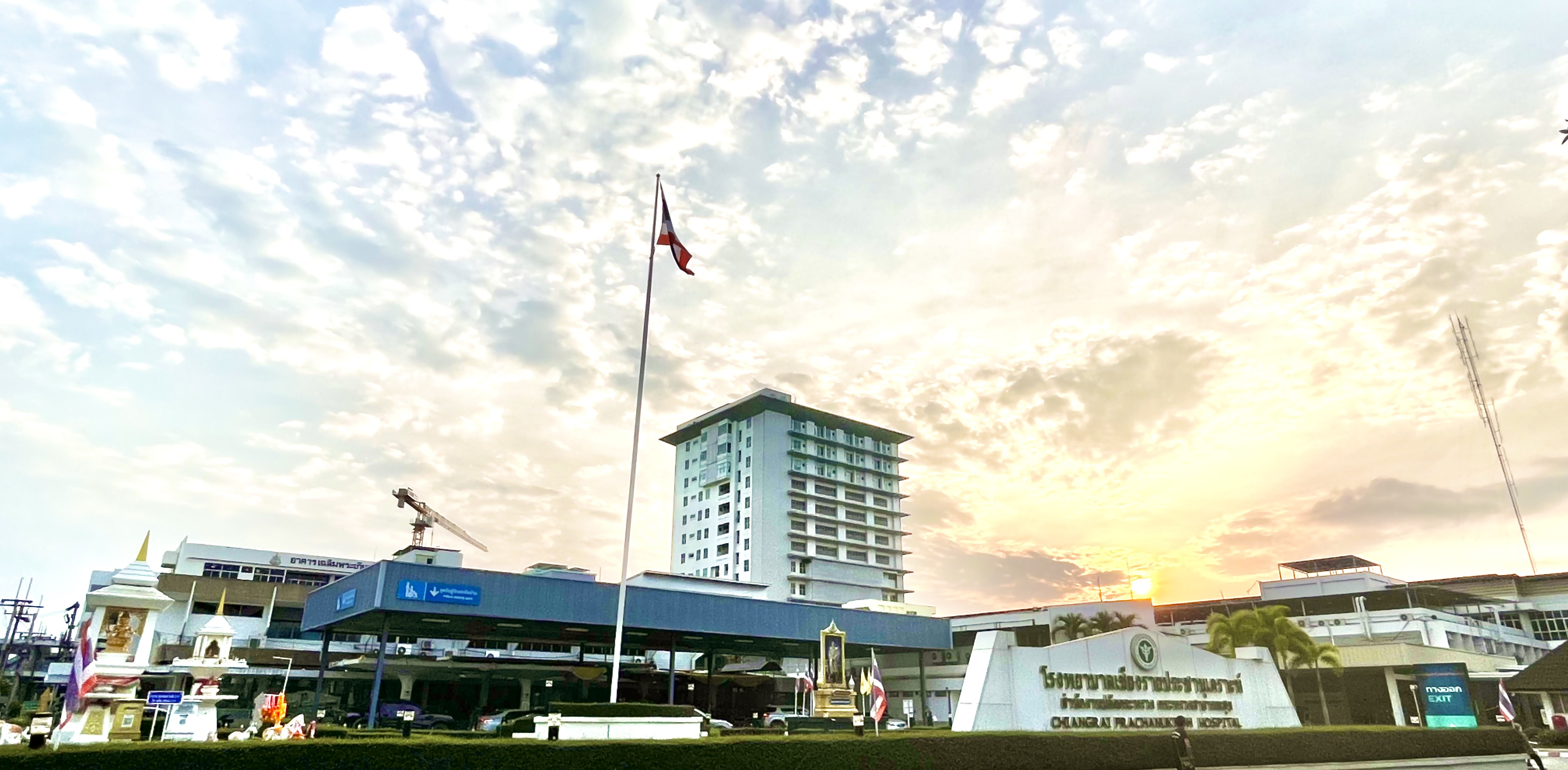
- Exterior view, January 2024

Geography
- Location: 1039 Sathanphayaban Road, Rop Wiang Subdistrict, Mueang Chiang Rai District, Chiang Rai 57000, Thailand
- Coordinates: 19.900976°N 99.829163°E

Organisation
- Type: Regional
- Affiliated university: Faculty of Medicine, Chiang Mai University

Services
- Beds: 773

History
- Opened: 11 February 1937 (as Chiangrai Prachanukroh Hospital)

Links
- Website: www.crhospital.org/home/index1.php
- Lists: Hospitals in Thailand

Chiangrai Prachanukroh Hospital (Thai: โรงพยาบาลเชียงรายประชานุเคราะห์; RTGS: Chiang Rai Prachanukhro; Thai pronunciation: [t͡ɕʰiaŋ raːj prà.t͡ɕʰaː.nú.kʰrɔ́ʔ]) is the main hospital of Chiang Rai Province, Thailand, and is classified under the Ministry of Public Health as a regional hospital. It has a CPIRD Medical Education Center which trains doctors of the Faculty of Medicine, Chiang Mai University.

== History ==
In 1932, a small hospital was opened and was called by the locals as 'Hong Ya Thai' (meaning Thai Hospital) as it was used to distinguish the hospital to another hospital officially named Overbrook Hospital, or 'Hong Ya Farang' (meaning Foreigner Hospital) run by the Church of Christ in Thailand. Following the coup in 1932, the Khana Ratsadon implemented the Public Health Act B.E. 2477 and under the prime ministership of Gen. Phraya Phahonphonphayuhasena as part of the 'Uad Thong' (lit. Flag Boasting) policy in 1936 to boost national identity. This led to the founding of a larger hospital in Chiang Rai as was proposed by the provincial officer of Chiang Rai Province, Phra Phanomnakhararak and had the support of the citizens led by Sihasak and Kimhia Traipaiboon. The construction of the hospital received extensive financial support from local citizens and companies, both Chiang Rai and in adjacent provinces such as Phayao. An area of 19 rai was also donated by the citizens in the area and the hospital was approved by the Ministry of Public Health.

The hospital opened on 11 February 1937 as 'Chiangrai Prachanukroh Hospital', where the term 'Prachanukroh' reflects the aid provided by local citizens in the construction of the hospital.

The hospital was also where the twelve members of the 'Wild Boar' junior football team, aged 11 to 17, and their 25-year-old assistant coach were treated following the Tham Luang cave rescue.

== See also ==
- Healthcare in Thailand
- Hospitals in Thailand
- List of hospitals in Thailand
