= Huay Kaew Waterfall =

- Interactive map of Huay Kaew Waterfall
- Coordinates: 18.812024°N 98.94455°E

Huay Kaew Waterfall (Thai: น้ำตกห้วยแก้ว, Nam Tok Huai Kaew) is a waterfall in Doi Suthep–Pui National Park, in Suthep, Mueang Chiang Mai district, Chiang Mai province, Thailand. It is about 6 kilometres from central Chiang Mai and is approximately 10 metres high.

== Geography ==
Huay Kaew Waterfall receives water from Monthathan Waterfall. Water flows at the waterfall throughout the year. The waterfall and its stream provide habitat for small aquatic animals, amphibians, and birds.

An eroded rock terrace near the waterfall forms a viewpoint overlooking Chiang Mai. The rocks have rough, weathered surfaces caused by water erosion and weathering.

The Huay Kaew stream originates from a natural spring known as Tan Nam Huay Kaew (ตาน้ำห้วยแก้ว) in the forest around Ban Khun Chang Kian on Doi Suthep. It flows through Monthathan Waterfall and Huay Kaew Waterfall before reaching Huay Kaew village and an irrigation canal.

It states that the water was thought to be clear like glass and that this was associated with the name Huay Kaew, with kaew referring to glass or crystal.

== Nature trail ==
Huay Kaew Waterfall is the starting point of the Huay Kaew–Pha Ngoep nature trail. The trail is about 3 kilometers long and takes approximately two to three hours for a round trip. It runs at elevations between 350 and 500 meters above sea level.

The forest along the trail consists of dry dipterocarp and mixed deciduous forest. The Doi Suthep Nature Center states that visitors can find various plant species, birds, insects, and small wild animals along the route. A viewpoint on the trail overlooks Chiang Mai city.
