= Chiang Mai University =

Public research university in Thailand

- มหาวิทยาลัยเชียงใหม่
- Seal of the University
- Motto: "Attānaṃ Damayanti Paṇḍitā" (Pāḷi)
- Motto in English: The wise control themselves
- Type: Public, National
- Established: June 18, 1964; 62 years ago
- Affiliations: ASAIHL, ASEAN University Network
- Budget: ฿1.2 billion
- President: Professor Pongruk Sribanditmongkol, M.D., PhD
- Royal conferrer: Maha Chakri Sirindhorn, Princess Royal of Thailand on behalf of the King
- Faculty: 2,680 (2022)
- Administrative staff: 10,080 (2022)
- Students: 38,269 (2023)
- Location: Mueang Chiang Mai, Chiang Mai, Thailand; 18°48′09″N 98°57′06″E
- Campus: 727.6 acres (294.4 ha) (Main Campus) 3,518.18 acres (1,423.76 ha) (Total); multiple sites (mostly urban)
- Colors: Purple
- Website: cmu.ac.th
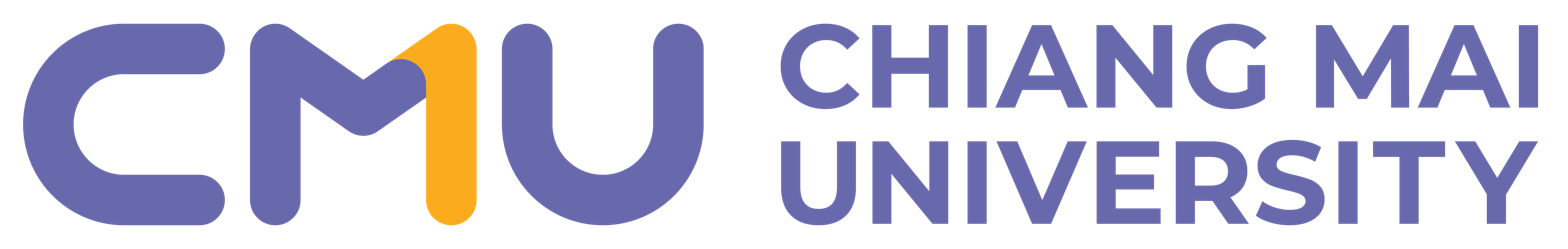

Chiang Mai University (CMU; Thai: มหาวิทยาลัยเชียงใหม่; Northern Thai: ᨾᩉᩣᩅᩥᨴᨿᩣᩱᩃ᩠ᨿᨩ᩠ᨿᨦᩉᩲ᩠ᨾ᩵) is a national public research university in northern Thailand founded in 1964. It has a strong emphasis on engineering, science, agriculture, and medicine. Its instructional mission includes undergraduate, graduate, professional, and continuing education offered through resident instruction. Its main campus lies between central Chiang Mai and Doi Suthep in Chiang Mai province.

The university was the first institution of higher education in northern Thailand and the first provincial university in Thailand.

== History ==
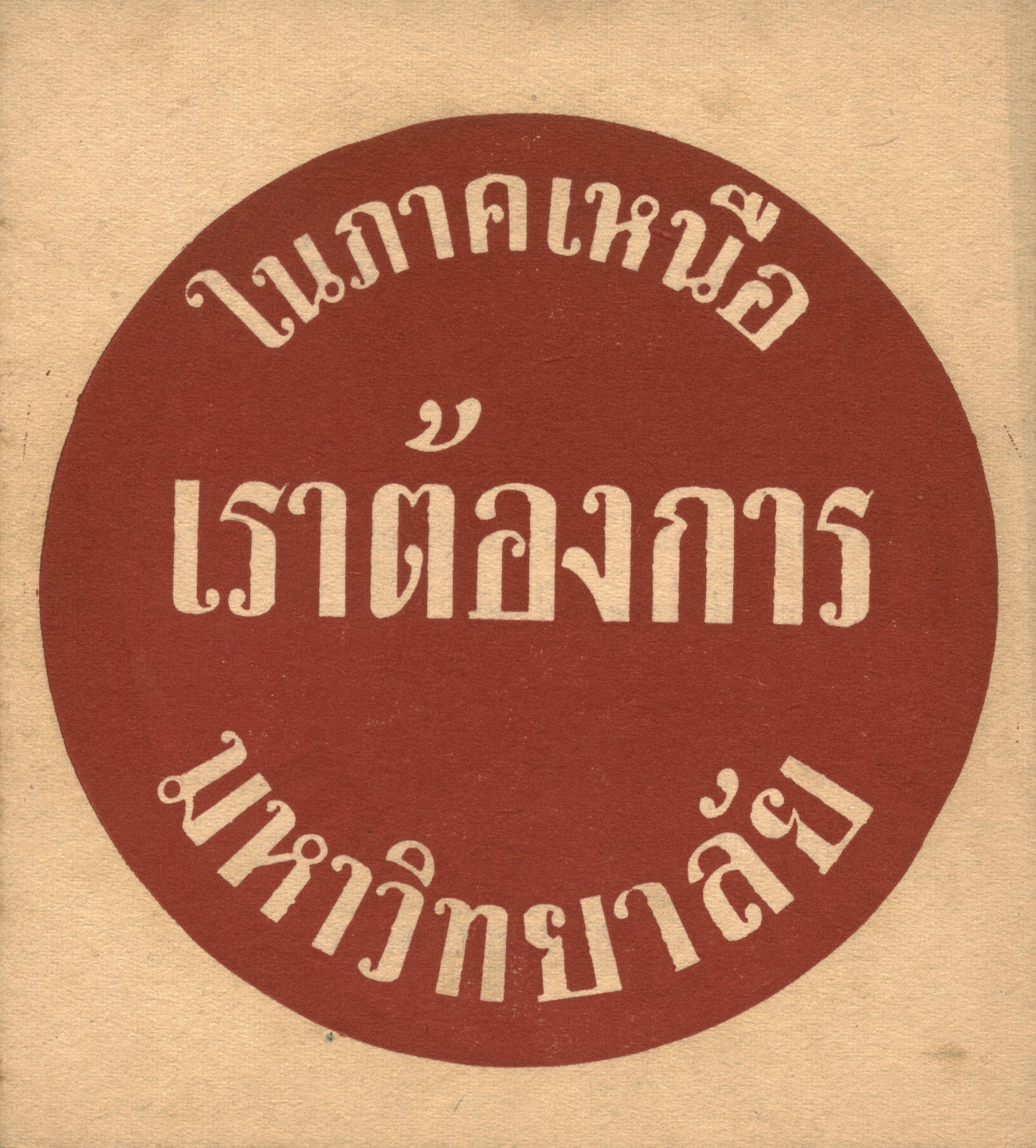
A circular sign demanding the university in Northern Thailand

In 1941, when Sindh Kamalanavin was the Minister of Education under Plaek Phibunsongkhram's premiership, the idea of expanding higher education to provincial areas was first proposed. Mom Luang Pin Malakul, the director of Triam Udom Suksa School at the time, was asked to provide advice on the establishment of a university in the provinces. But when the Greater East Asia War broke out, these plans ultimately went on hold.

After the end of the war, the people of Chiang Mai, led by Ki and Kimhaw Nimmanhaeminda, called for the provision of higher education in the regions and urged the government to establish a university in Chiang Mai Province. This movement gained strong momentum, and one form of public expression during the campaign was the dissemination of printed cards conveying opinions and demands, which were distributed among students and the general public.

A resolution to establish a university in the Chiang Mai province was finally approved by the Sarit Thanarat's Cabinet in 1960, with plans to start classes in 1964. Mom Luang Pin Malakul chaired the preparatory committee for the establishment of Chiang Mai University while he served as the Minister of Education. He carefully and diligently spent an extensive amount of time in the preparations, overseeing every aspect, which included defining the institution's mission and establishment policies, surveying the site, planning the university's layout, developing curricula and teaching arrangements, developing facilities, and laying the foundation for higher education.

The Chiang Mai University Act was promulgated on 15 January 1964 and published in the Royal Gazette on 21 January, coming into force on the day following its publication in the Royal Gazette. The university officially commenced its first academic instruction on 18 June 1964. In its initial phase, three faculties were established as the foundation of all academic disciplines: the Faculty of Humanities, the Faculty of Social Sciences, and the Faculty of Science.

In the following year, King Bhumibol Adulyadej and Queen Sirikit presided over the official opening ceremony of the university on 24 January 1965, accompanied by Princess Ubol Ratana and Crown Prince Vajiralongkorn.

== Campuses ==
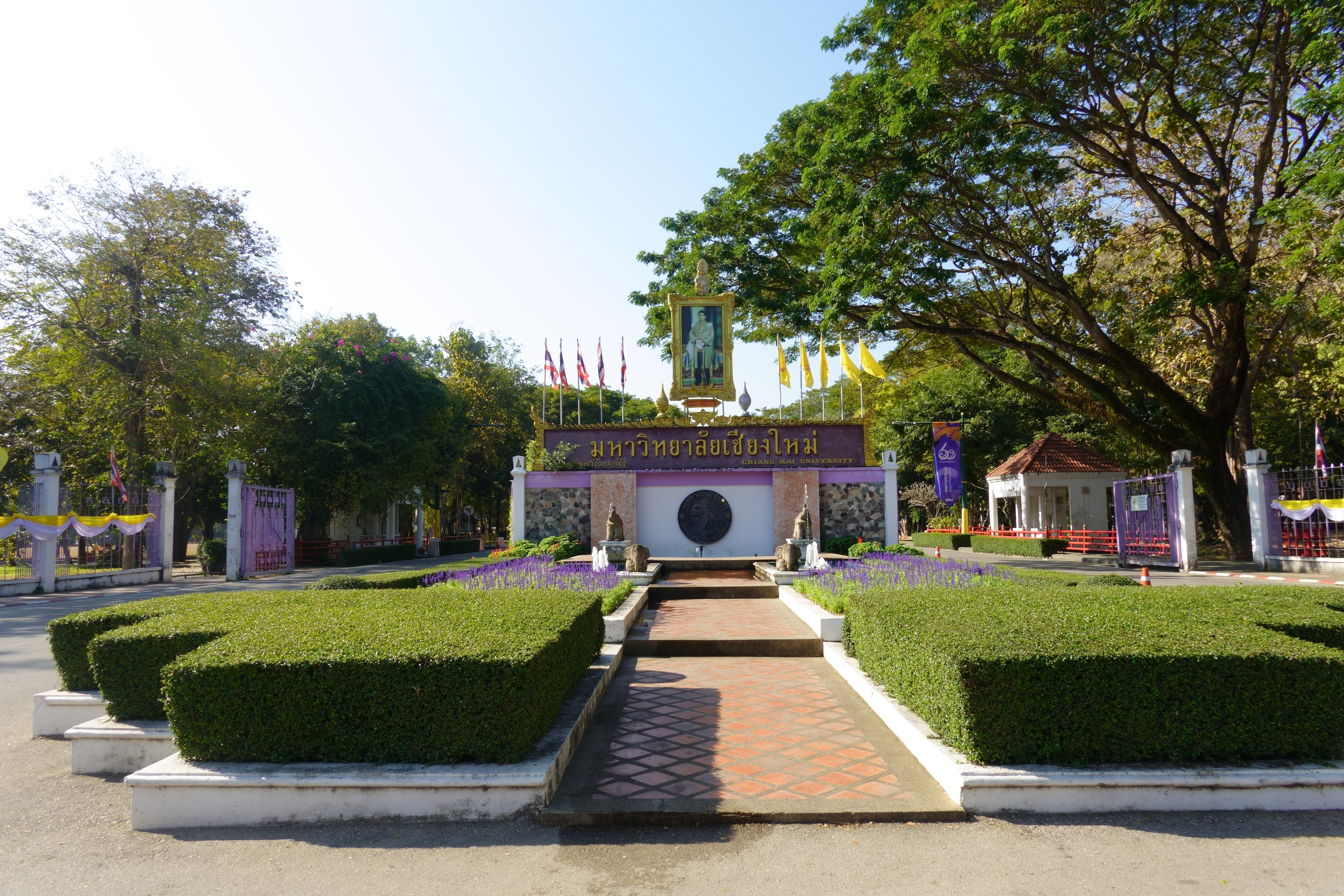
Front gate of Chiang Mai University's main campus. Entrance located along Huay Kaew Road

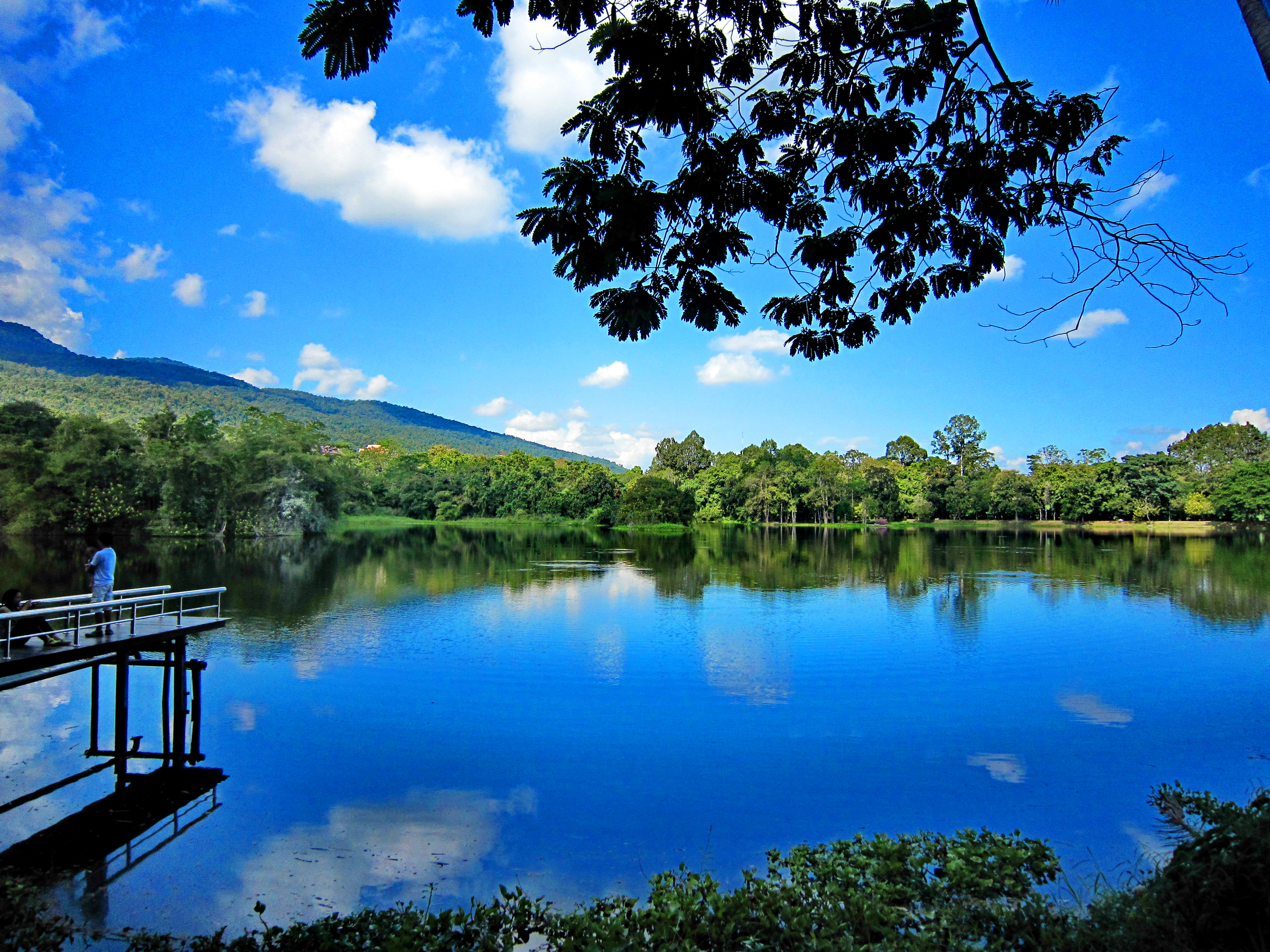
Ang Kaew Reservoir on main campus

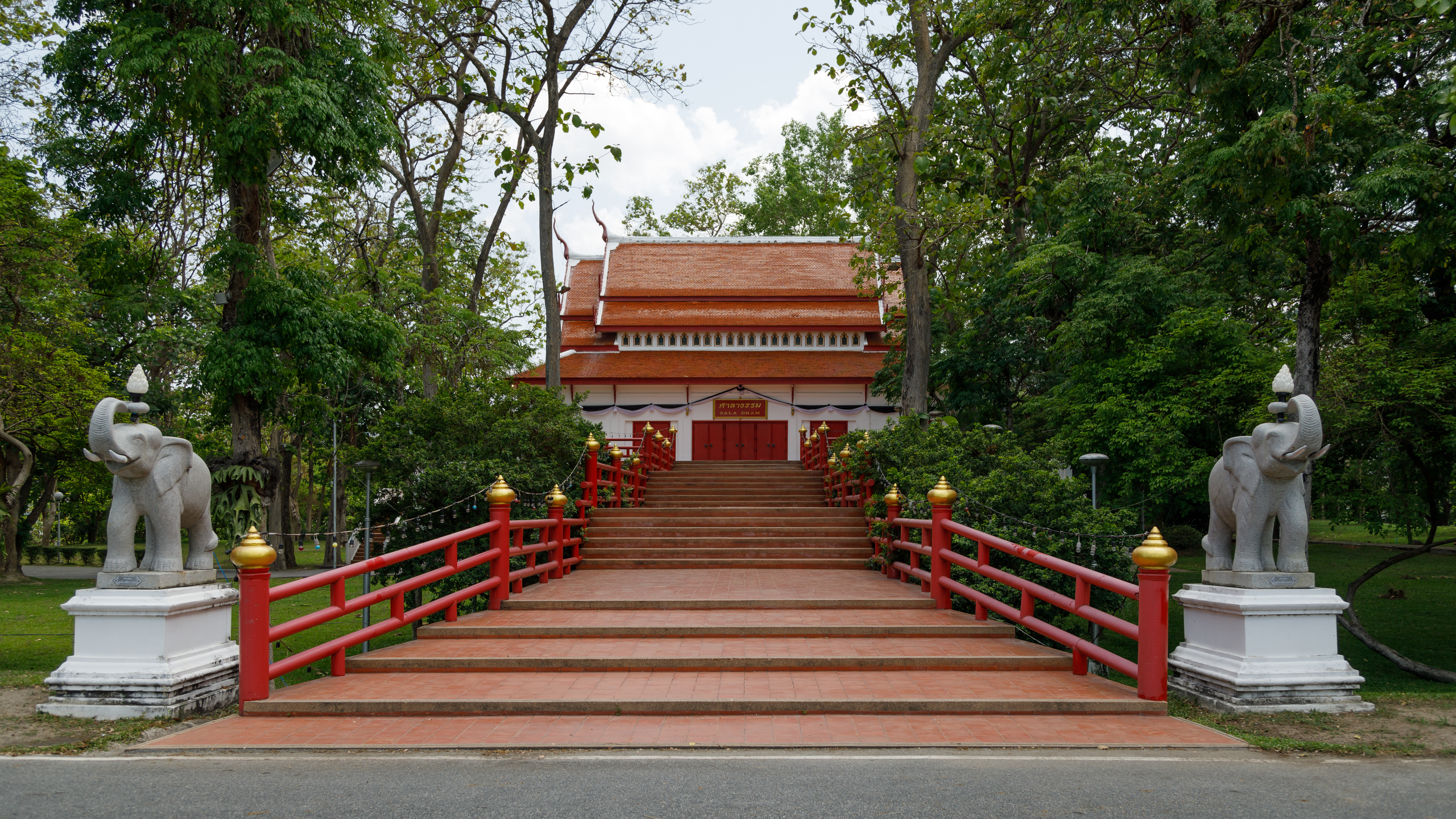
Sala Dharma on main campus

Chiang Mai University has four campuses, three of them in Chiang Mai and one in Lamphun, which together cover about 3,490 acres (14.1 km^{2}). There are 18 housing complexes located on campus for students attending the university. Seventeen of them are on the main campus and one is on the Mae Hea campus

=== Suan Sak Campus (main campus) ===
The main university campus, known as Suan Sak campus (Thai: สวนสัก) or Cherng Doi (Thai: เชิงดอย), lies about five kilometres west of the city centre. Set against Doi Suthep, the campus occupies a 725-acre (2.93 km^{2}) site, bounded on three sides by main shopping streets and on the fourth by the Chiang Mai Zoo. The campus includes the university's administrative centre; the science, engineering, humanities, social science, political science and public administration, law and graduate school, all of the campus resource facilities and services and major sports facilities. An attractive feature of this campus is the Ang Kaew Reservoir. Constructed to supply water for the university, it is also a recreational area for campus residents and the local community. In the 1960s, the area was still forested. With conservation in mind, university buildings were constructed between the trees, with the result that the campus still retains much of its original setting.

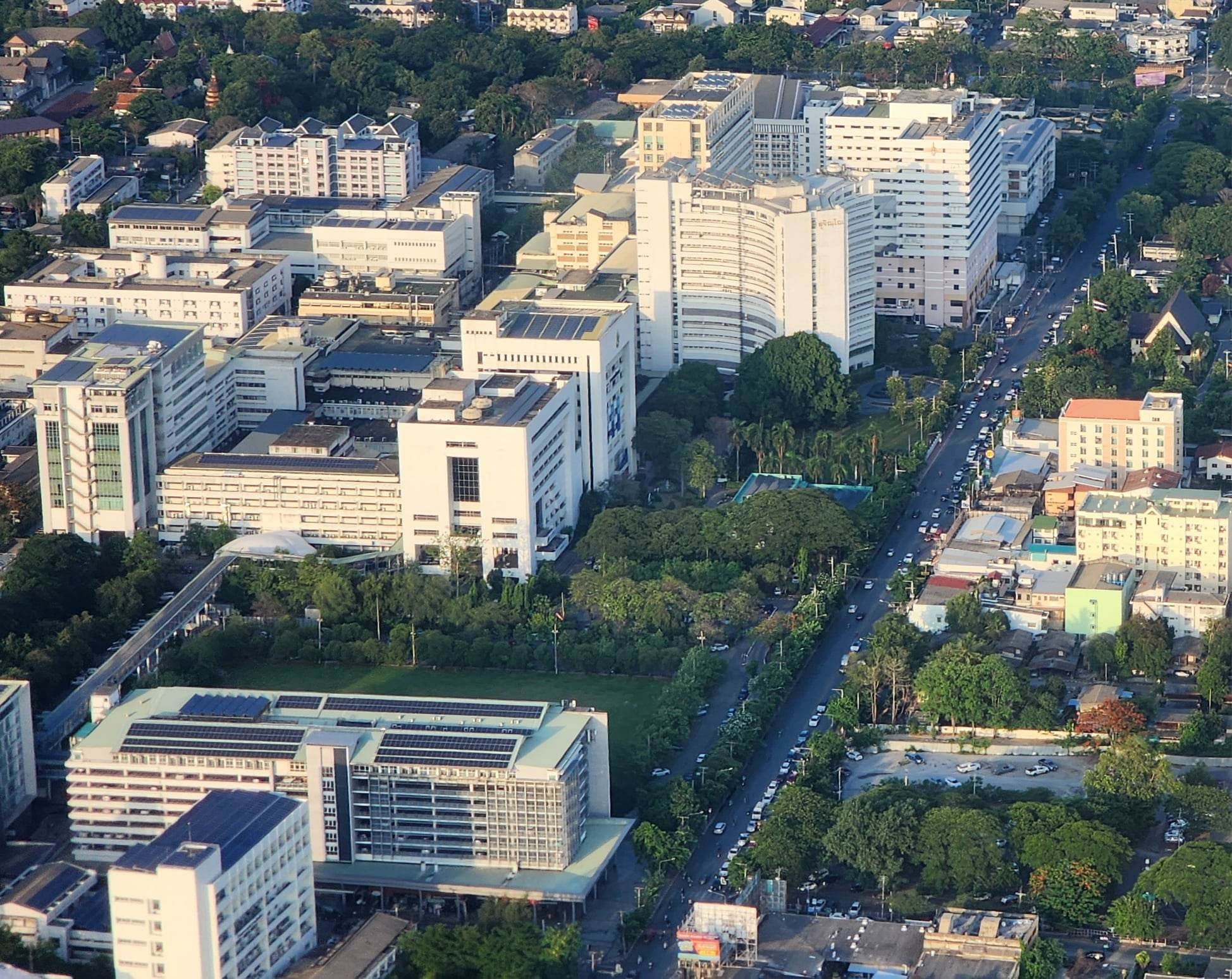
Maharaj Nakorn Chiang Mai Hospital, Suan Dok campus

=== Suan Dok campus ===
Near the main campus, and closer to the city, opposite Wat Suan Dok, the health sciences complex, the Suan Dok campus (Thai: สวนดอก), occupies a 110-acre (0.45 km^{2}) site which includes faculties of medicine, associated medical sciences, nursing, dentistry, pharmacy, and Maharaj Nakorn Chiang Mai Hospital, known locally as Suan Dok, the largest teaching hospital in northern Thailand.

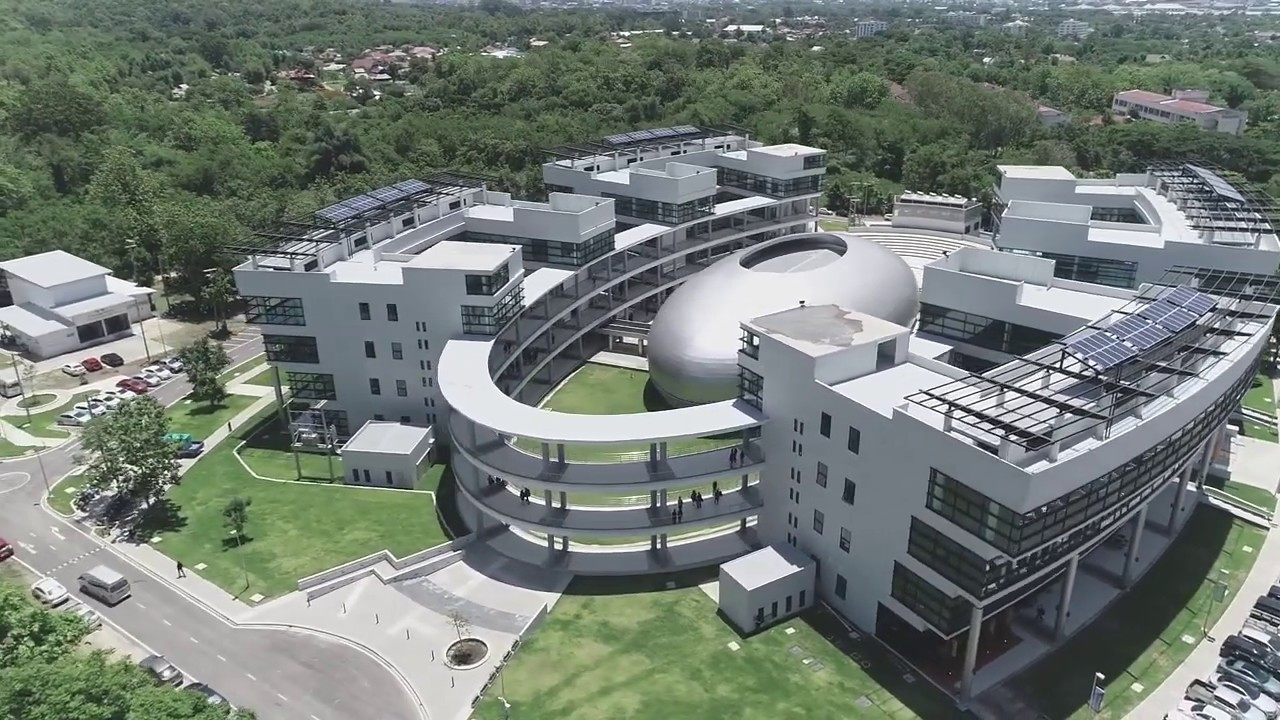
Science and Technology Park, Mae Hia campus

=== Mae Hia campus ===
About 5 km south of the main campus, the 864-acre (3.50 km^{2}) Mae Hia (or Mae Hea) campus (Thai: แม่เหียะ) is home to the faculties of veterinary medicine and agro-industry. The Energy Research and Development Institute (ERDI), the university centre for renewable energy (mainly biogas and biomass), and the energy efficiency improvement centre moved from the main campus to the Mae Hia campus in January 2009. This centre is a national "biogas centre of excellence", emphasising biogas activities, especially biogas on swine farms.

=== Si Bua Ban campus ===
The university's latest acquisition is the Si Bua Ban campus (Thai: ศรีบัวบาน) in Amphoe Mueang Lamphun, Lamphun Province, about 55 kilometres south of Chiang Mai, on a 1,890-acre (7.6 km^{2}) site close to the Lamphun industrial centre.

== Academics ==
Chiang Mai University is a large, highly residential, research university, with a majority of enrollment coming from graduate and professional students.

=== Faculty ===
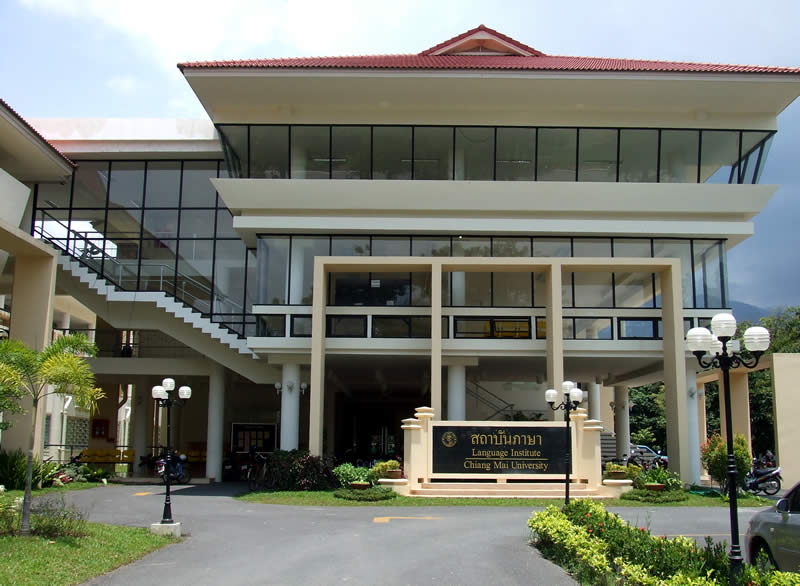
Language Institute

Chiang Mai University has a total of 20 faculties, 3 colleges, 2 institutes and 1 graduate school.

Science and Technology

- Faculty of Agriculture
- Faculty of Agro-Industry
- Faculty of Architecture
- Faculty of Engineering
- Faculty of Science
- College of Arts Media and Technology
- International College of Digital Innovation

Liberal Arts and Social Sciences

- Chiang Mai University Business School
- Faculty of Economics
- Faculty of Education
- Faculty of Fine Arts
- Faculty of Humanities
- Faculty of Law
- Faculty of Political Science and Public Administration
- Faculty of Social Sciences
- Faculty of Mass Communication
- School of Public Policy
- Multidisciplinary and Interdisciplinary School

Health Science

- Faculty of Associated Medical Sciences
- Faculty of Dentistry
- Faculty of Medicine
- Faculty of Nursing
- Faculty of Pharmacy
- Faculty of Veterinary Medicine
- Faculty of Public Health
- Biomedical Engineering Institute

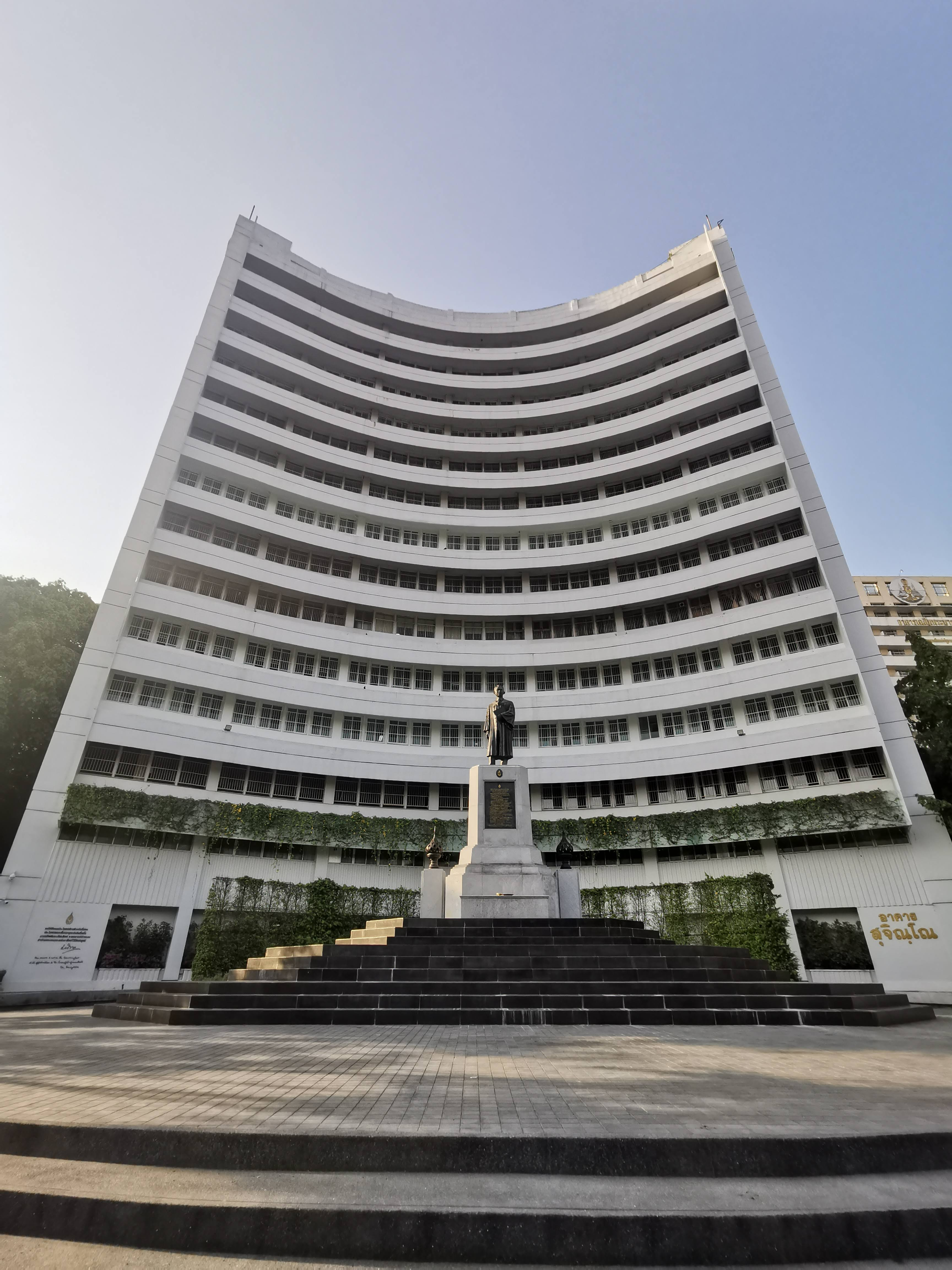
Faculty of Medicine

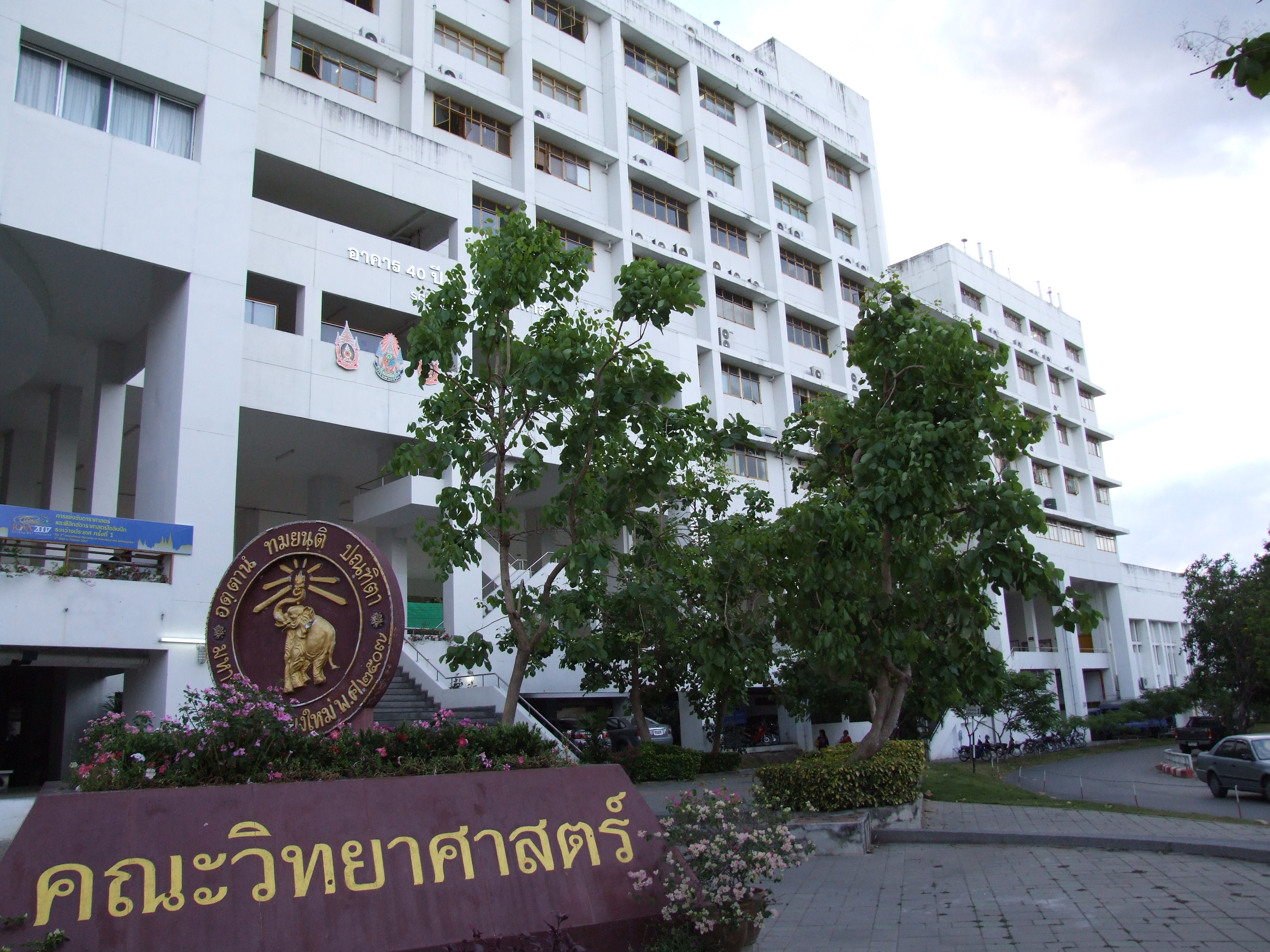
Faculty of Science

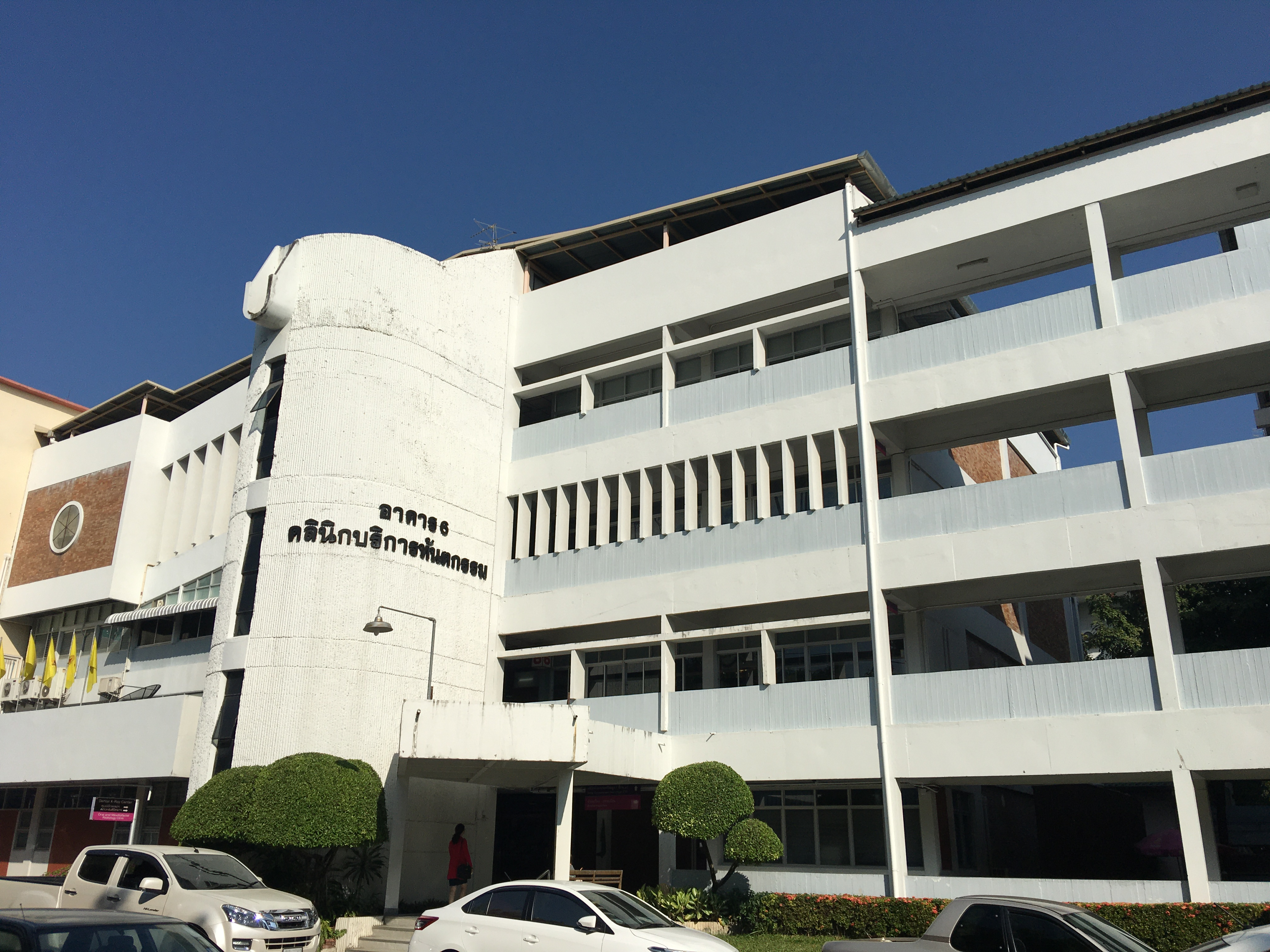
Faculty of Dentistry

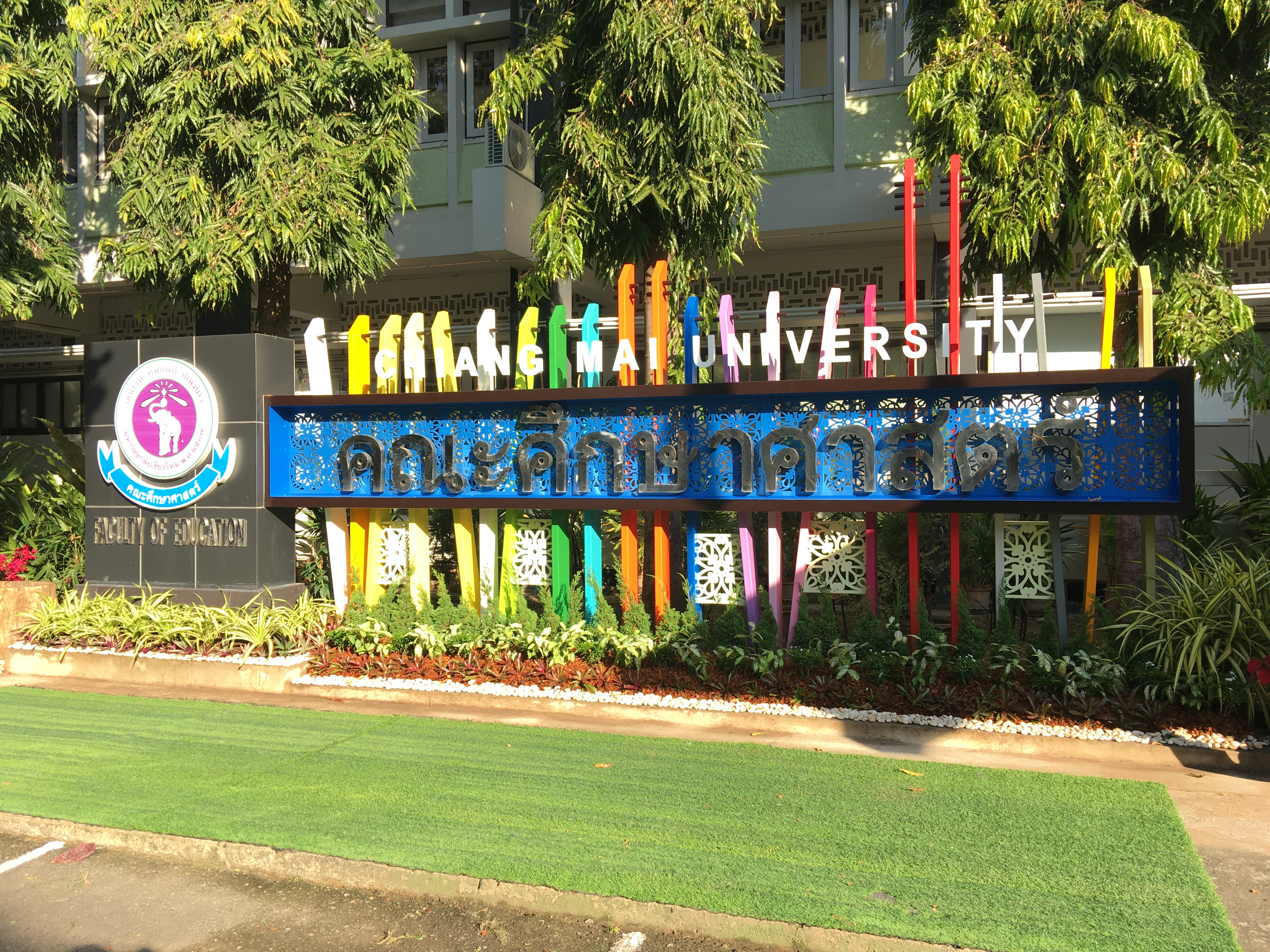
Faculty of Education

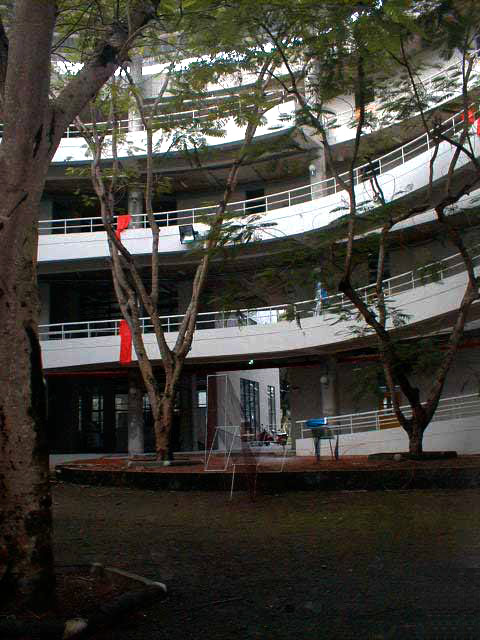
Faculty of Architecture

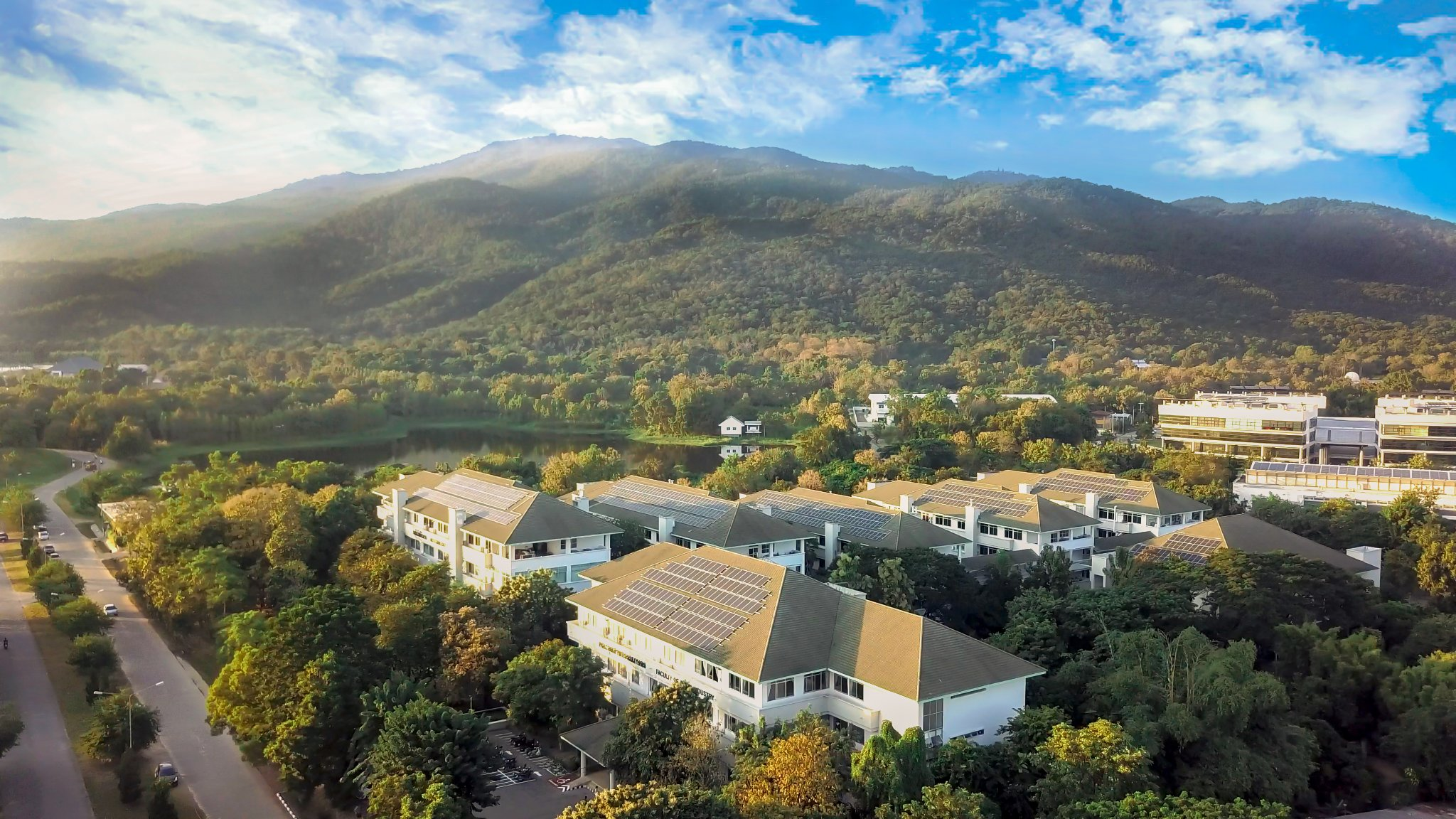
Faculty of Agro-Industry

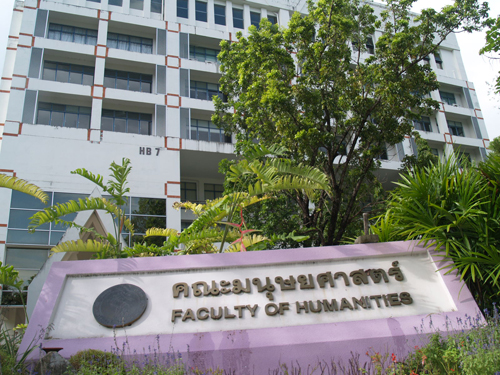
Faculty of Humanities

=== Rankings ===
University rankings

Global – Overall
- ARWU World: 601–700 (2023)
- QS World: =526 (2026)
- THE World: 801–1000 (2024)
- USNWR Global: =739 (2022)

Regional – Overall
- QS Asia: =99 (2024)
- THE Asia: 351–400 (2023)

National – Overall
- ARWU National: 2–3 (2023)

Chiang Mai University ranks 3rd in academics and 5th in research according to the Office of the Higher Education Commission. Quacquarelli Symonds ranked the university 88th in Asia in 2023. Chiang Mai University Ranking has been going up recently giving it 601–605 place by QS TOP UNIVERSITY RANKINGS in 2023

=== Research institutes ===
- Energy Research and Development Institute-Nakornping (ERDI)
- Research Institute for Health Sciences (RIHES)
- Social Research Institute (SRI)

=== Non-university schools ===
- Language Institute Chiang Mai University (LICMU)
- Chiang Mai University Demonstration School (K-12)

== University operations ==
The university requires students to wear school uniforms. The Student Development Division, in 2022, supported the dress code.

== Notable people ==
=== Alumni ===
- Chaturon Chaisang, Deputy Prime Minister from 2002 to 2006
- Sompop Jantraka, activist
- Apirak Kosayothin, 14th Governor of Bangkok
- Yingluck Shinawatra, 28th Prime Minister of Thailand
- Samruam Singh, author, scholar and activist
- Suthep Thaugsuban, Deputy Prime Minister from 2008 to 2011
- Kasem Wattanachai, Privy Councilor from 2001–present
- Jitaraphol Potiwihok, an actor and a doctor
- Purim Rattanaruangwattana, an actor and a singer

=== Lecturers ===
- Roger A. Beaver, biologist
- Minfong Ho, writer
