= Thailand Advanced Institute of Science and Technology =

Thailand Advanced Institute of Science and Technology-Tokyo Institute of Technology
- สถาบันวิทยาศาสตร์และเทคโนโลยีขั้นสูงแห่งประเทศไทย-สถาบันเทคโนโลยีแห่งโตเกียว
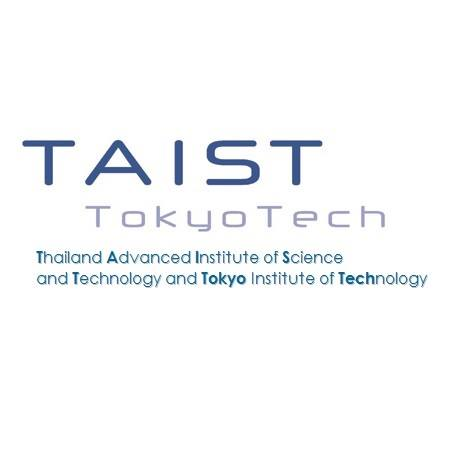
- Established: 2007
- Affiliations: National Science and Technology Development Agency and Tokyo Institute of Technology, cooperate with King Mongkut's Institute of Technology Ladkrabang, Sirindhorn International Institute of Technology, Kasetsart University, King Mongkut's University of Technology Thonburi, and Mahidol University
- Location: Thailand
- Nickname: TAIST-Tokyo Tech
- Website: http://www.nstda.or.th/taist_tokyo_tech/

Thailand Advanced Institute of Science and Technology-Tokyo Institute of Technology (TAIST-Tokyo Tech; Thai: สถาบันวิทยาศาสตร์และเทคโนโลยีขั้นสูงแห่งประเทศไทย-สถาบันเทคโนโลยีแห่งโตเกียว, RTGS: Sathaban Witthayasat Lae [Technology] Khan Sung Haeng Prathet Thai - Sathaban [Technology] Haeng [Tokyo]) is a virtual higher education institution in Thailand, established in 2007. It is a project supported by Thailand's National Science and Technology Development Agency (NSTDA) to act as a focal point for academic and research collaboration among NSTDA and partner universities both domestic and abroad. Students will enrolled in a host university, work with researchers in NSTDA, and get a degree from the host university.

Domestic partners, as of 2012, were King Mongkut's Institute of Technology Ladkrabang, Sirindhorn International Institute of Technology, Kasetsart University, King Mongkut's University of Technology Thonburi, and Mahidol University, with Tokyo Institute of Technology as a first foreign partner.

They offer master degree programs in Automotive Engineering; Information and Communication Technology with Embedded Systems; and Advanced and Sustainable Environment Engineering. Courses are taught mainly by professors from Tokyo Institute of Technology.

== Partners ==
This is not a comprehensive list

- National Science and Technology Development Agency
- Tokyo Institute of Technology
- King Mongkut's University of Technology Thonburi
- King Mongkut's Institute of Technology Ladkrabang
- Kasetsart University
- Sirindhorn International Institute of Technology
- Thailand Science Park

== See also ==
- Thailand Graduate Institute of Science and Technology
