= Yongyuth Yuthavong =

Thai scientist, born 1944

- ยงยุทธ ยุทธวงศ์
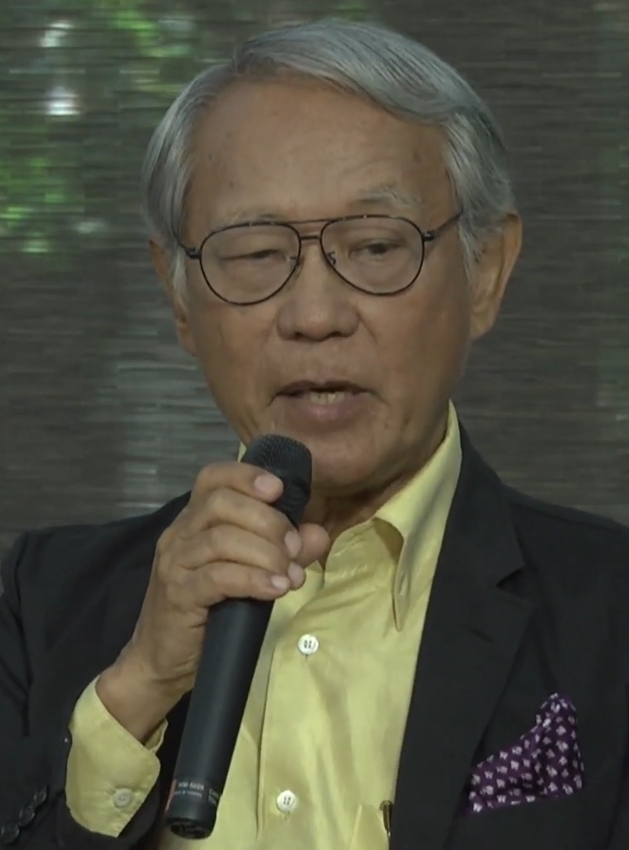

Deputy Prime Minister of Thailand
- In office 30 August 2014 – 19 August 2015
- Prime Minister: Prayut Chan-o-cha

Minister of Science and Technology
- In office 9 October 2006 – 6 February 2008
- Prime Minister: Surayud Chulanont
- Preceded by: Prawit Rattanaphian
- Succeeded by: Wuttipong Chaisang

Personal details
- Born: 4 May 1944 (age 82) Lopburi, Thailand
- Spouse: Onchuma Yuthavong

Yongyuth Yuthavong (Thai: ยงยุทธ ยุทธวงศ์, RTGS: Yongyut Yutthawong; born 4 May 1944) is a Thai biochemistry researcher and science policy administrator. He is an emeritus professor at the Biochemistry Department of Mahidol University's Faculty of Science, and is known for research work on anti-malarials and drug resistance thereof. He also played a key role in Thailand's science policy planning in the 1980s and 1990s, helping to establish the Ministry of Science and Technology, the National Center for Genetic Engineering and Biotechnology (BIOTEC) and the National Science and Technology Development Agency (NSTDA). He served as Minister of Science and Technology from 2006 to 2008 and as deputy prime minister from 2014 to 2015, in both cases appointed by non-elected governments following coups in 2006 and 2014. In 2016, he became a laureate of the Asian Scientist 100 by the Asian Scientist.
