= Shenzhen International BT Leadership Summit =

Shenzhen International BioTech Leadership Summit 深圳国际BT领袖峰会
- Status: Defunct
- Genre: Conference
- Date: 2014
- Frequency: Annually
- Venue: Shenzhen Convention and Exhibition Center
- Location: Shenzhen
- Country: China
- Founder: Shenzhen Municipal People's Government
- Most recent: 2017

Shenzhen International BioTech Leadership Summit (simplified Chinese: 深圳国际BT领袖峰会; traditional Chinese: 深圳國際BT領袖峰會) was a Chinese biotech business conference that was held each year in September and ran between 2014 and 2017. It was arranged by the Shenzhen Municipal People's Government and was held at the Shenzhen Convention and Exhibition Center.

The Shenzhen government development emphasizes biology and the life science industry as an important element of economic guidance and industrial restructuring. The government issued an industrial development plan for biology and life science industry to give strong support for policies, funds, projects and talents.

== Structure ==
The Summit was composed of three parts: speeches, dialogue and a professional forum. Under the aim of "Committed to accelerating the integration and development of global biological resources, science and technology, industry, capital", the summit calls on experts, scholars and entrepreneurs at home and abroad to discuss new models, explore new directions and build a new environment around issues, technology trends, industry information and policy in the development of biology and life science technology and industry.

== Previous summits ==
=== 2017 ===
The Summit was held 21–23 September 2017. Its theme was to develop wisdom and great health, build the new engine of industry. It was supported by the Ministry of science and technology, China Biotechnology Development Center, China Medicinal Biotechnology Association and the China Quality Association for Pharmaceuticals. The sponsors were Shenzhen Development and Reform Commission and Shenzhen Science and Technology Innovation Committee.

==== Keynote speakers ====
- Barry Marshall, Nobel prize in Physiology or Medicine in 2005, foreign academicians of Chinese Academy of Engineering, Australian scientists.
- Rao Yi, lifelong tenured professor of Peking University, director of the Science Department of Peking University.

==== Speeches ====
- Development trend and task of innovative drugs
- Opportunity and challenge of big data development of health care

==== Professional fora ====
- Transformation and application of nanobiological technology in medical field
- Innovation application and development of big data development of health care
- Prospect of innovation and entrepreneurship of precision medicine
- Tumor molecular diagnosis and individualized treatment
- New directions in investment of immunization therapy
- Development of new cardiovascular and cerebrovascular diagnostic industry
- Key technology forum for generic drug development frontier and consistency evaluation
- Shenzhen Hong Kong health services Development Forum
- Index system of regional health assessment for life economy
- The Sixteenth International Conference on Bioinformatics--- Bioinformatics data mining and Application Forum faced for precision medical services
- Discussion on biopharmaceutical industry based on Microbiology

=== 2016 ===
The theme was "developing green economy and creating a better life".

==== Keynotes ====
- New model of cross - Pacific cooperation in cancer precision medical industry
- Advances in biological therapy and biotechnology drugs

==== Speeches ====
- BT innovation industry circle in the era of big health

==== Professional forum ====
- Smart medicine in the era of big data
- Cell therapy leads the revolution of medical technology
- Drug listing permit holder system preach and bio innovation drug research and development forum
- Development and future strategy of medical robot industry
- The "bounce back" of xenotransplantation
- Gene sequencing industry development
- "Shenzhen international Bio Valley" precision medical international collaborative innovation
- Health industry and scientific and technological innovation development in Shenzhen, Hong Kong

=== 2015 ===
The theme was "developing green economy and creating a better life".

==== Keynotes ====
- Fight cancer: CarT therapy for cancer
- Translational medicine: opportunities and challenges
- Biotechnology innovation in the era of great health

==== Speeches ====
- Opportunities and challenges in the era of precision medical care
- Biological medicine, medical technology and instrument supervision policy

==== Professional forum ====
- The integration of global customers and industry
- Brain & Future
- New techniques and trends in cell therapy and The awarding ceremony of Shenzhen synthetic cell bank, Shenzhen (North Science) regional cell preparation center
- New medical materials and 3D printing
- Internet Finance + Medical Innovation Seminar
- Synthetic biology and industrial applications
- Modernization and internationalization of traditional Chinese Medicine
- Explore the innovation way of Chinese pharmaceutical enterprises in new situation

=== 2014 ===
==== Keynotes ====
- The new future of human biology and biomedical research
- Intelligence development of big data and medical health industry

==== Professional forum ====
- High end biomedical engineering in the information age
- Chinese medicine and marine biological medicine industry development forum
- Application of biotechnology in modern agricultural economy
- Cell therapy and regenerative medicine
- Personalized medical care in the whole genome era
- Policy innovation in the field of health care
