= M-150 (energy drink) =

Thai energy drink

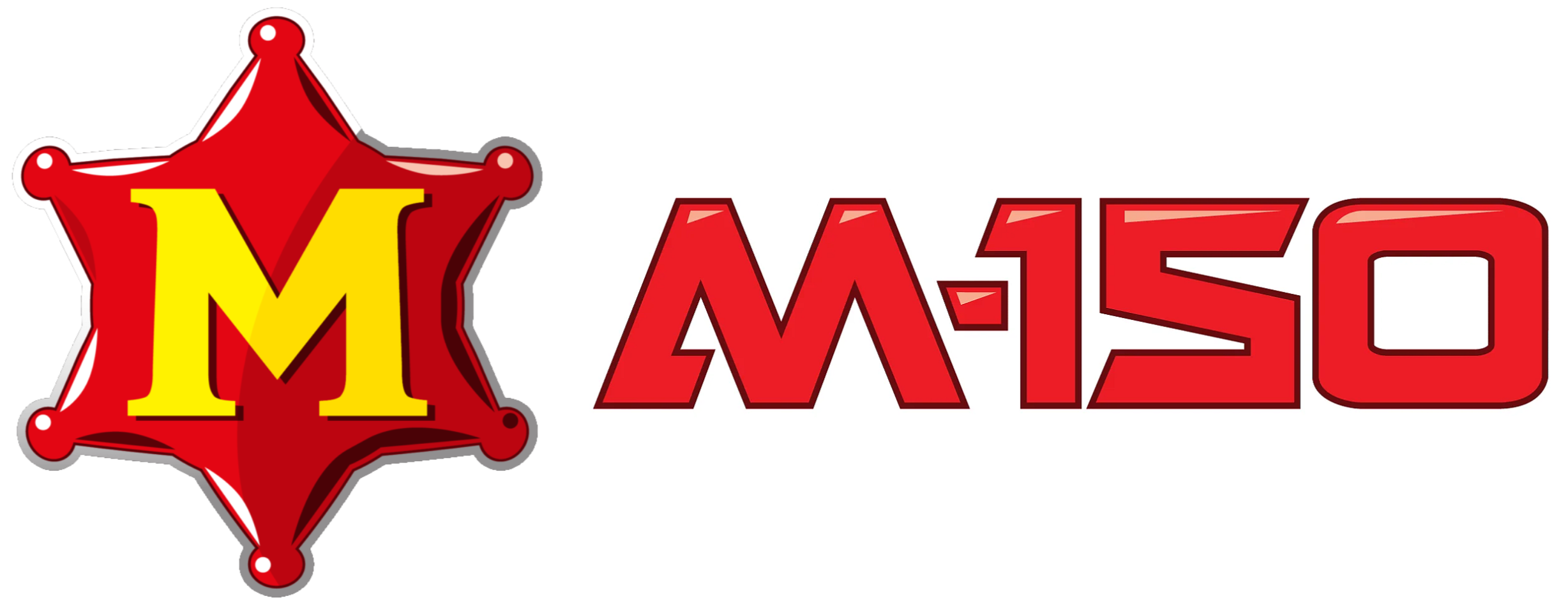

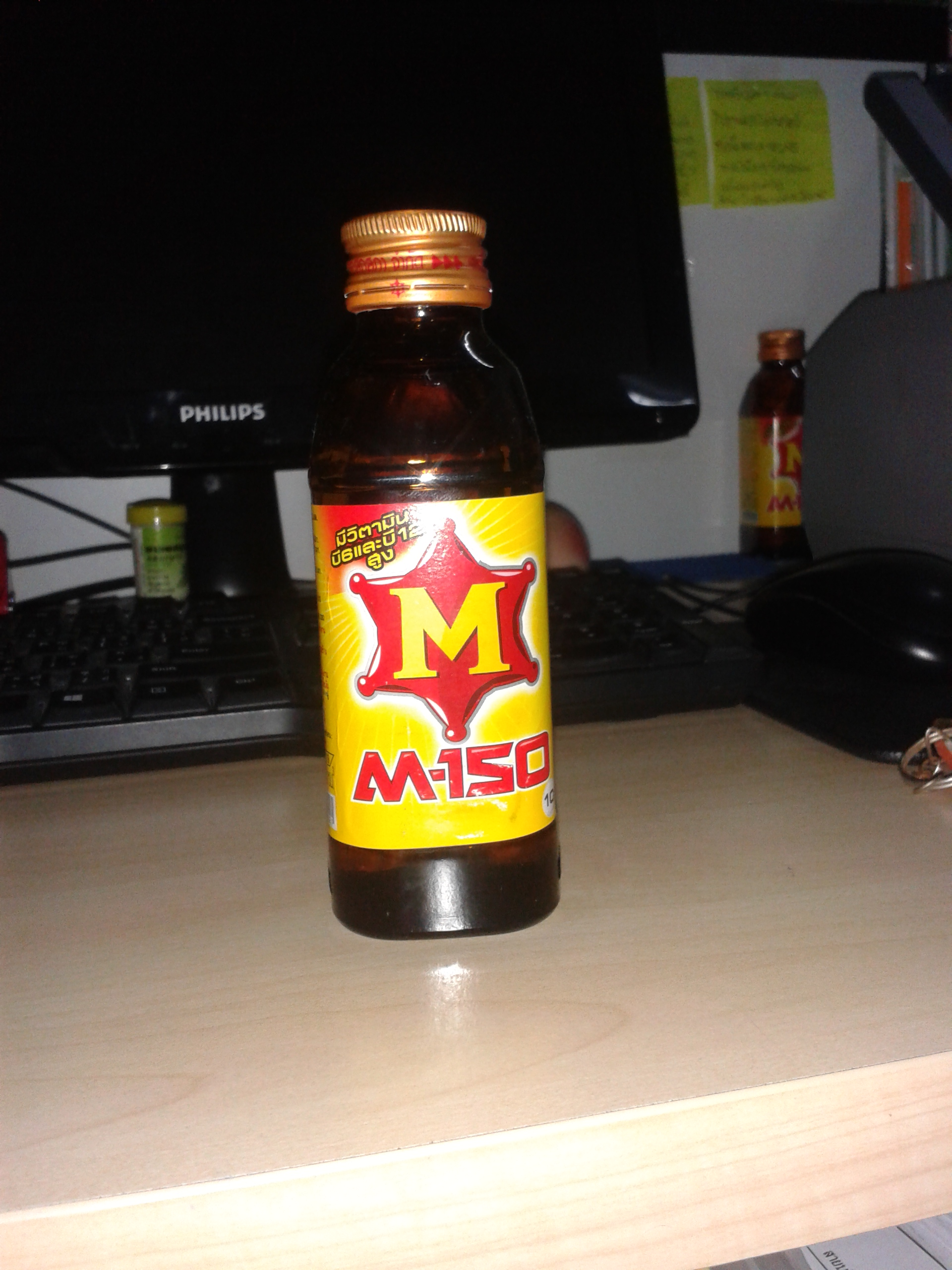
- M-150 bottle (2013)
- Type: Energy drink
- Manufacturer: Osotspa Co. Ltd.
- Origin: Thailand
- Introduced: 1985
- Colour: Amber
- Flavour: Sweet
- Website: Official website

M-150 is a non-carbonated energy drink marketed by the Thai beverage company Osotspa. In Thailand, it is sold in 150 mL glass bottles.

== See also ==
- Lipovitan-D
- Carabao
- Krating Daeng
