= Surat Osathanugrah =

Thai politician, businessman, and police officer

- สุรัตน์ โอสถานุเคราะห์
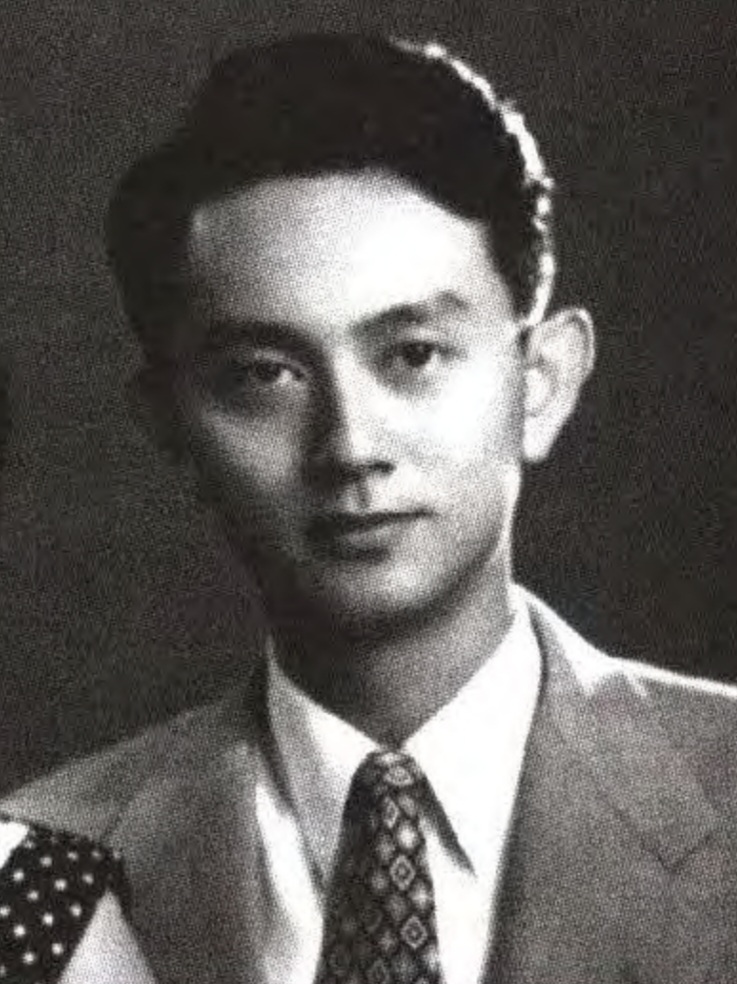

Minister of Commerce
- In office 15 January 1986 – 6 November 1986
- Prime Minister: Prem Tinsulanonda
- Preceded by: Kosol Krairiksh
- Succeeded by: Montri Pongpanit

Minister of Transport
- In office 15 February 1975 – 13 March 1975
- Prime Minister: Seni Pramoj
- Preceded by: Chao Na Silawan
- Succeeded by: Siri Siriyothin

Personal details
- Born: 11 May 1930 Phra Nakhon, Siam
- Died: 8 May 2008 (aged 77) Bangkok, Thailand
- Party: Democrat Party (1968–1974); Social Action Party (1974–1990); National Development Party (1992–2000); Thai Rak Thai Party (2000–2007)
- Spouse: Pongthip Osathanugrah
- Children: 2, including Petch Osathanugrah
- Parent: Sawat Osathanugrah (father)
- Education: University of Colorado
- Occupation: Politician, businessman
- Profession: Police officer

Military service
- Rank: Police Captain

Surat Osathanugrah (Thai: สุรัตน์ โอสถานุเคราะห์; RTGS: Surat Osathanukrao; 11 May 1930 – 8 May 2008) was a Thai politician, businessman, and police officer. He served as Minister of Commerce and Minister of Transport of Thailand. He was also the founder of Bangkok University and chairman of Osotspa.

== Early life and education ==
Surat was born on 11 May 1930 in Phra Nakhon, Siam. He studied at Debsirin School and Triam Udom Suksa School, and later attended Wilbraham & Monson Academy in Massachusetts, United States. He received a bachelor's degree in business administration from the University of Colorado.

== Career ==
=== Police and business career ===
Surat served in the Thai police and attained the rank of police captain before leaving government service in 1957. He later became a leading executive of Osotspa and chaired companies within the Osotspa group.

=== Political career ===
Surat entered politics as a member of the House of Representatives for Phra Nakhon under the Democrat Party. He later joined the Social Action Party and became one of its leading figures.

He was appointed Minister of Transport in 1975. In 1986, he was appointed Minister of Commerce. He resigned later that year following a no-confidence debate concerning timber import licensing from Myanmar.

== Other roles ==
Surat was the founder of Bangkok University and was active in education, business, and photography organizations. He also served as president of the Photographic Society of Thailand under royal patronage.

== Family ==
Surat was married to Pongthip Osathanugrah, with whom he founded Bangkok University. They had two sons, Petch Osathanugrah and Ratch Osathanugrah. Petch later served as rector of Bangkok University and held executive roles at Osotspa, while Ratch was also involved in the family's business interests.

== Death ==
Surat died on 8 May 2008 in Bangkok, three days before his 78th birthday.
