= China Hi-Tech Fair =

Technology fair in Shenzhen, China

The Shenzhen High-Tech Fair (Chinese: 深圳高交会, 高交会), officially known as the China Hi-Tech Fair (中国国际高新技术成果交易会, CHTF), is one of the most influential technology fairs in Shenzhen, China. It is jointly organized by Chinese National and Shenzhen municipal government departments and research institutions.

== Description ==
Since its inception in 1999, the fair has been held annually in Shenzhen, usually at the Shenzhen Convention and Exhibition Center in mid-November. The fair serves not only as a platform for technological exchange but also as an important venue for connecting innovative startups with capital.

The fair covers multiple fields, including but not limited to electronic information, environmental protection, new energy, biotechnology, and advanced manufacturing. Additionally, the CHTF includes forums, technical seminars, product launches, and international cooperation exchanges, attracting numerous domestic and international enterprises, research institutions, and investors.
