= International Conference on Bioinformatics =

- Frequency: Annually
- Locations: Shenzhen, China (2017)
- Years active: 24
- Previous event: InCoB 2017
- Next event: InCoB 2018
- Organiser: Jinyan Li, Lan Ma (2017 chairs)
- Member: APBioNet
- Website: incob.apbionet.org

The International Conference on Bioinformatics (InCoB) is a scientific conference on bioinformatics aimed at scientists in the Asia Pacific region. It has been held annually since 2002. Originally organised by coordination between the Asia Pacific Bioinformatics Network (APBioNet) and the Thailand National Center for Genetic Engineering and Biotechnology (BIOTEC) in 2002, the meeting has since been the flagship conference of the APBioNet, where APBioNet's Annual General Meeting is held.

== Scientific publications ==
Since 2006, InCoB has been partnering with BMC Bioinformatics to publish an InCoB Special Conference Issue of top papers presented at the conference. In 2007, an additional tie-up with the Bioinformation journal was established in addition to the BMC Bioinformatics issue.

== Technological placeshifting ==
Since 2007, InCoB held in Hong Kong University of Science and Technology, has been placeshifted in an additional location in a developing country venue, namely the Vietnam National University, Hanoi (VNU) through the advanced videoconferencing project of APAN and TEIN2. In 2015, InCoB was organised jointly with the International Conference on Genome Informatics in an attempt to increase effectiveness and scalability.

== Satellite training workshops ==
Since 2007, at the VNU site coordinated by the Institute of Biotechnology Hanoi (IBT), InCoB coordinated with the International Union for Biochemists and Molecular Biologists (IUBMB), the Federation of Asian Oceanian Biochemists and Molecular Biologists (FAOBMB) and APBioNet to hold a two-week bioinformatics training course with course faculty from Karolinska Institutet, NCBI and National University of Singapore, supported by the S* Alliance for Bioinformatics Education and BioSlax, a software development project hosted at NUS as part of an ASEAN SubCommittee on Biotechnology (SCB) project. This collaboration with IUBMB and FAOBMB continues in 2008 with a bioinformatics education workshop in Taipei, Taiwan, where the main meeting of InCoB 2008 will be situated.

== Past and present conferences ==
Conference	Location(s)	Hosting Institution(s)
InCoB 2002	Bangkok, Thailand	
InCoB 2003	Penang, Malaysia	
InCoB 2004	Auckland, New Zealand	
InCoB 2005	Busan, South Korea	
InCoB 2006	Delhi, India	
InCoB 2007	Hong Kong, China; Hanoi, Vietnam	Hong Kong University of Science and Technology
InCoB 2008	Taipei, Taiwan	
InCoB 2009	Singapore	
InCoB 2010	Tokyo, Japan	
InCoB 2011	Kuala Lumpur, Malaysia	
InCoB 2012	Bangkok, Thailand	National Science and Technology Development Agency, BIOTEC, KMUTT
InCoB 2013	Taicang, China	
InCoB 2014	Brighton-Le-Sands, New South Wales, Australia	
InCoB 2015	Odaiba, Japan	
InCoB 2016	Singapore	
InCoB 2017	Shenzhen, China	Tsinghua University
InCoB 2018	New Delhi, India	Jawaharlal Nehru University
InCoB 2019	Jakarta, Indonesia	Universitas YARSI
InCoB 2020	Asia-Pacific and Beyond	Virtual
