= Juntree Siriboonrod =

Thai writer

Juntree Siriboonrod (Thai: จันตรี ศิริบุญรอด; (March 31, 1917 –) was a Thai novelist. He is regarded as the "father of Thai science fiction".

== Life ==
Juntree began his career as a civil servant in the Mineral Fuels Division (now the Department of Mineral Fuels of the Ministry of Energy) of the Thai government. He began writing novels and science-related articles in limited circulation as a senior high school science teacher at the Kenneth Mackensie School in Lampang Province. In 1945, he collaborated on the magazine Witthayasat Mahatsachan alongside Dr Preecha Amatyakul, then Assistant Secretariat of the Science Society of Thailand. Under this name he published works of science fiction, science-related articles and biographies on scientists, continuing to do so until his resignation in 1959.

== Works ==
1. Lok Thalom
2. Phu Dap Duang Athit*
3. Phu Phop Phaendin*
4. Manut Khu
5. Phu Sang Anakhot

Works marked with an asterisk were selected for the 88 Good Thai Science Books list.

== Juntree Siriboonrod Award ==
In 2005, Nanmee Books Co. Ltd. along with the Science Writers & Publisher Forum (SciPub), the Science Society of Thailand Under the Patronage of His Majesty the King, the Junior Science Talent Project (JSTP) and the Thailand National Science and Technology Development Agency established the Juntree Siriboonrod Award for achievements in the field of Thai science fiction.
