= Pathum Thani province =

Coordinates: 14°1′15″N 100°31′29″E

Pathum Thani ปทุมธานี
- Province
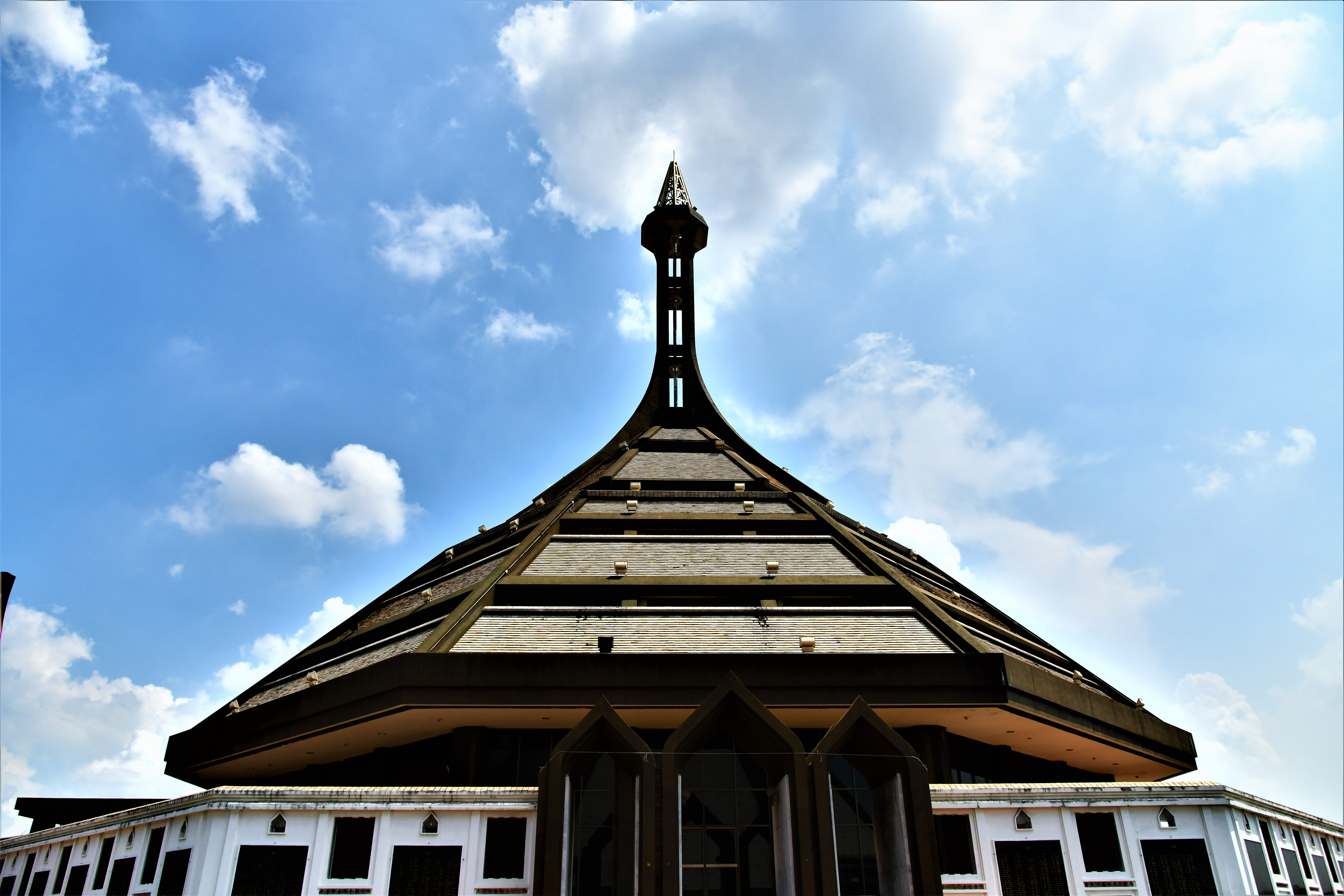
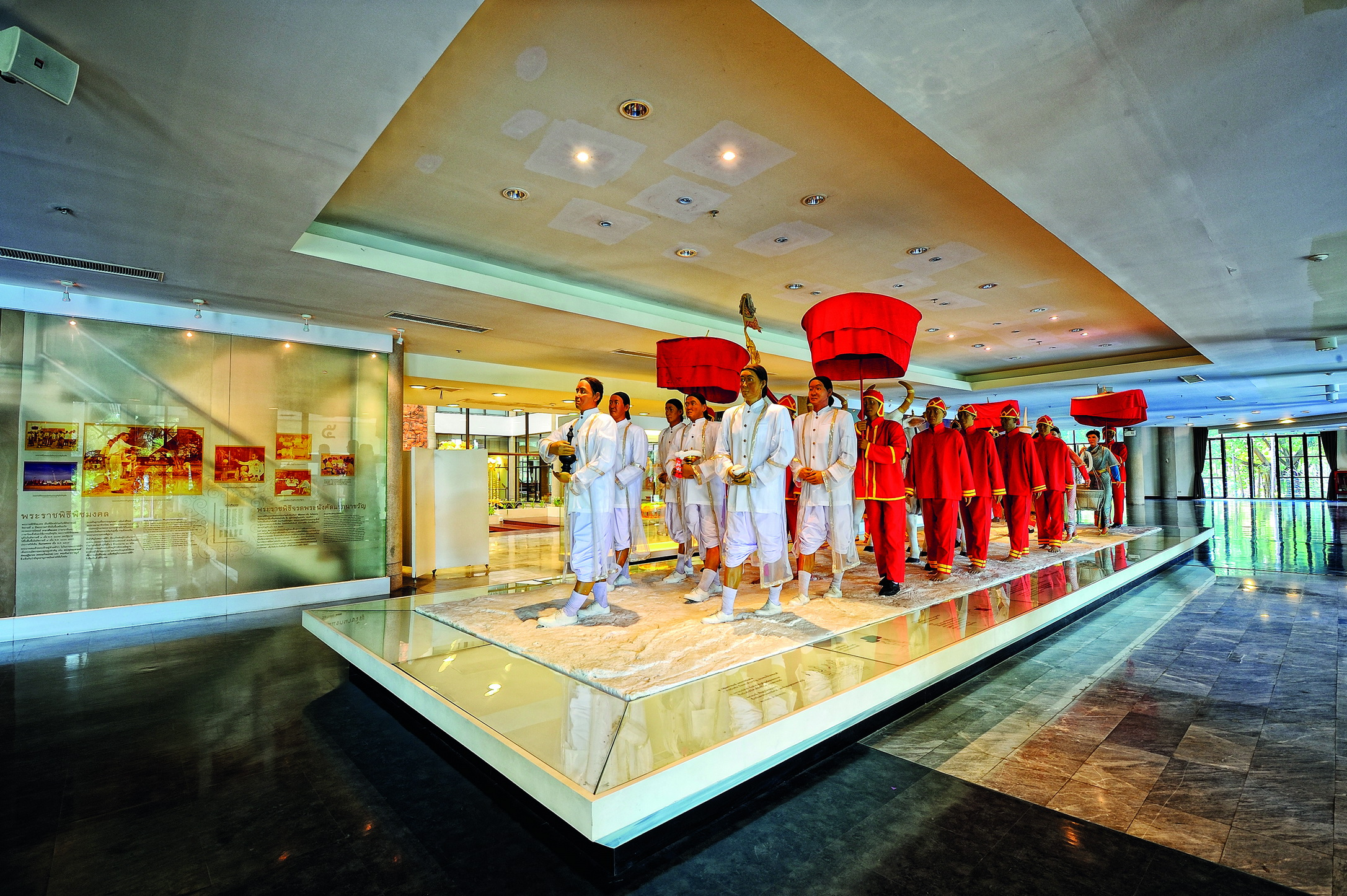
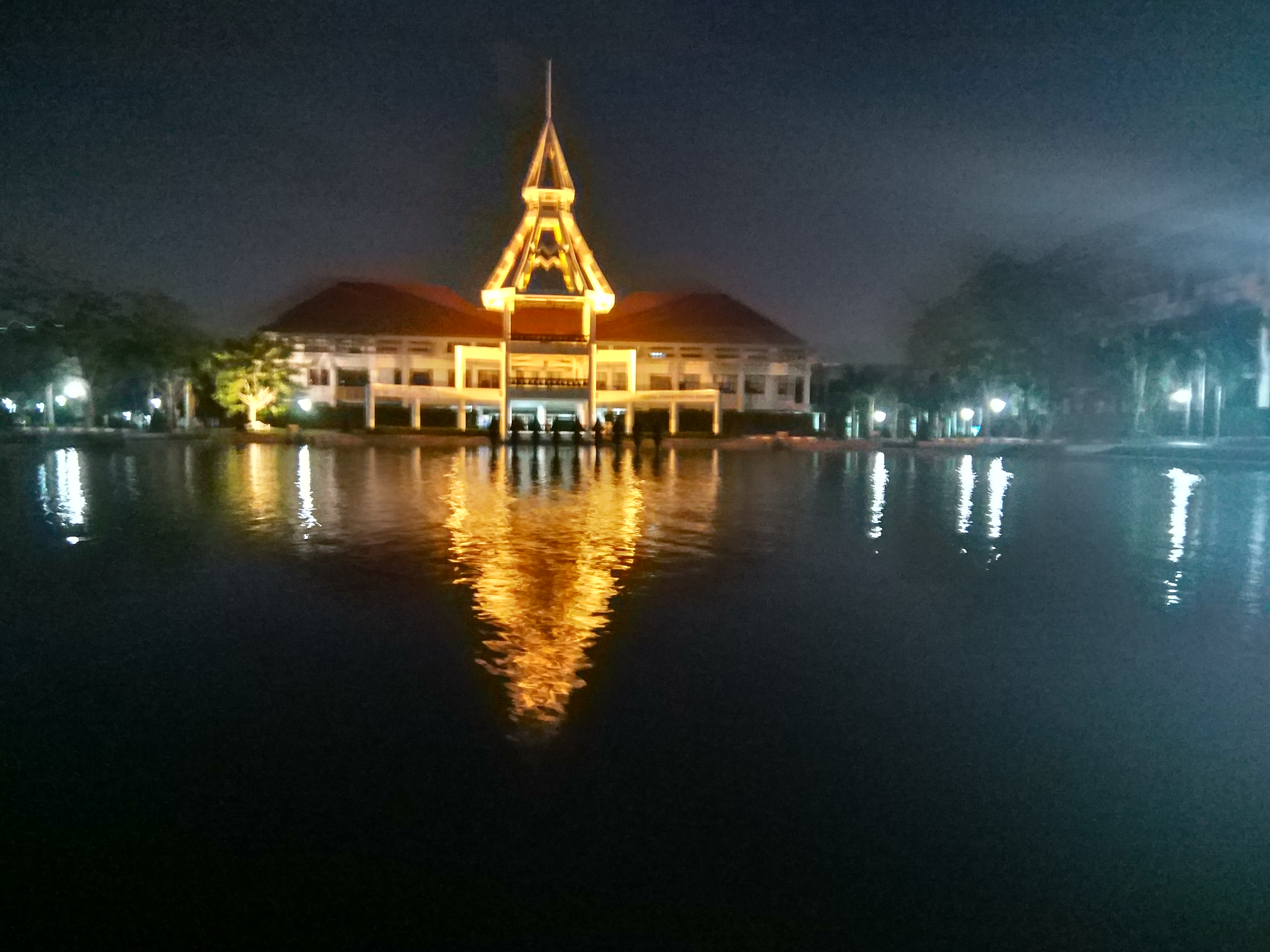
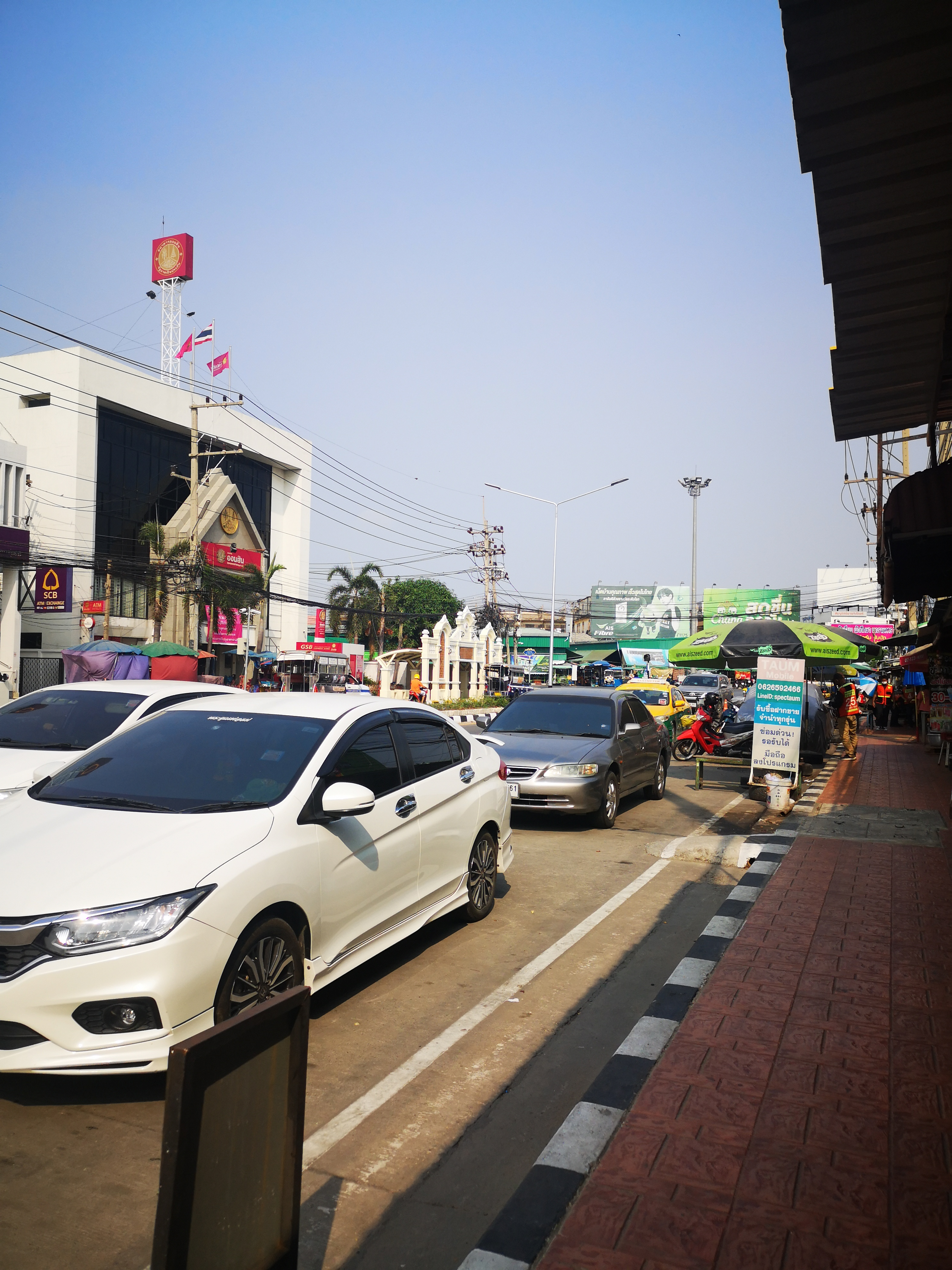
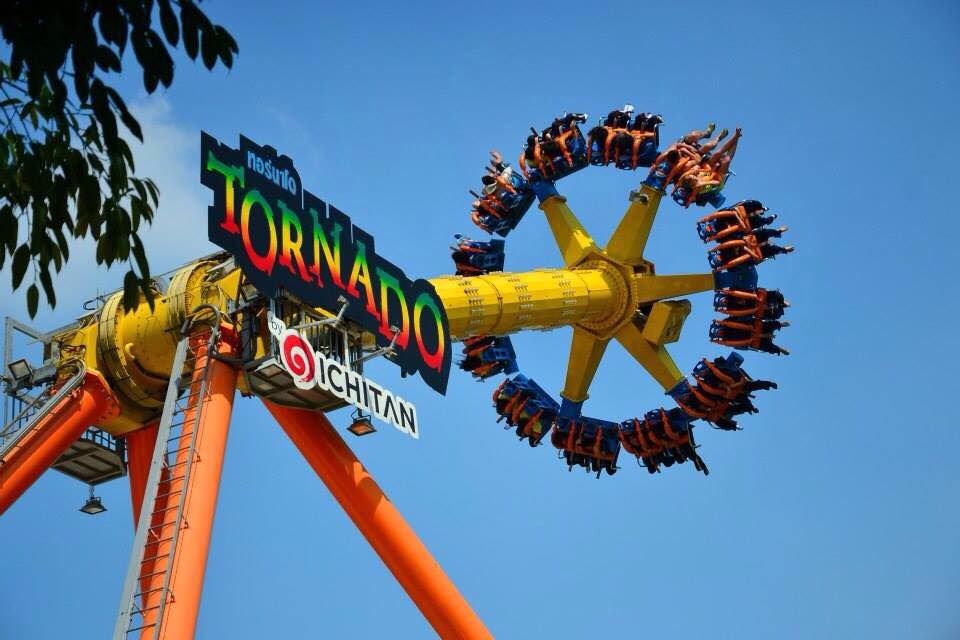
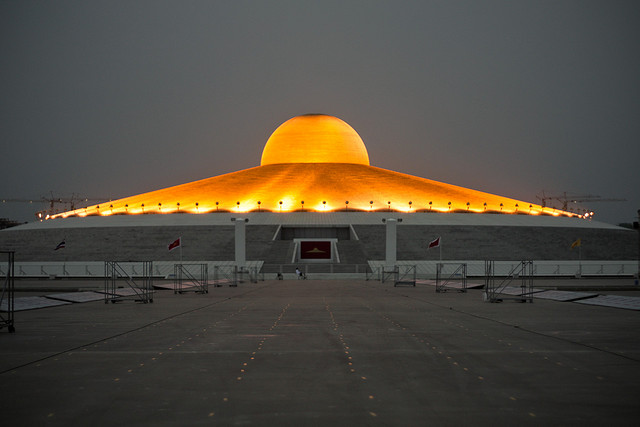
- From left to right, top to bottom: Thailand National Memorial; A Royal Ploughing Ceremony exhibition in Golden Jubilee Museum of Agriculture; Thammasat University's pond; Street in Pathum Thani town; Tornado frisbee in the Dream World; Wat Phra Dhammakaya

- Flag Seal
- Nicknames: Pathum (ปทุม); Mueang Pathum (เมืองปทุม)
- Mottoes: ถิ่นบัวหลวง เมืองรวงข้าว เชื้อชาวมอญ นครธรรมะ พระตำหนักรวมใจ สดใสเจ้าพระยา ก้าวหน้าอุตสาหกรรม ("Home of the royal lotus. Town of rice ears. Mon people. City of Dharma. Palace of unity. Bright Chao Phraya (River). Progressive industry.")
- Map of Thailand highlighting Pathum Thani province
- Country: Thailand
- Region: Central Thailand
- Capital: Pathum Thani
- Largest City: Rangsit

Government
  - Type: Province and Provincial Administrative Organization
  - Body: Pathum Thani Province and Pathum Thani Provincial Administrative Organization
  - Governor: Ekawit Meephian
  - PAO Chief Executive: Kamronwit Thoopkrachang

Area
  - Total: 1,520 km^{2} (590 sq mi)
  - Rank: 70th

Population (2024)
  - Total: ▲1,236,471
  - Rank: 17th
  - Density: 813/km^{2} (2,110/sq mi)
  - Rank: 4th

Human Achievement Index
  - HAI (2022): 0.6589 "somewhat high" Ranked 15th

GDP
  - Total: baht 381 billion (US$13 billion) (2019)
- Time zone: UTC+7 (ICT)
- Postal code: 12###
- Calling code: 02
- ISO 3166 code: TH-13
- Website: pathumthani.go.th pathumpao.go.th

Pathum Thani (Thai: ปทุมธานี, pronounced [pā.tʰūm tʰāːnīː]) is a province (changwat) in Central Thailand. Neighboring provinces are (from north clockwise): Phra Nakhon Si Ayutthaya, Saraburi, Nakhon Nayok, Chachoengsao, Bangkok, and Nonthaburi.

The province is north of Bangkok and is part of the Bangkok metropolitan area. In many places, the boundary between the two provinces is not noticeable as both sides of the boundary are equally urbanized. Pathum Thani town is the administrative seat, but Rangsit, seat of Thanyaburi district, is the largest populated place in the province.

Pathum Thani is an old province, heavily populated by the Mon people, dotted with 186 temples and parks. The Dream World amusement park is here.

== Geography ==
The province lies on the low alluvial flats of the Chao Phraya River that flows through the capital. Many canals (khlongs) cross the province and feed the rice paddies. There is no forest area in the province.

== Climate ==
Pathum Thani province has a tropical savanna climate (Köppen climate classification category Aw). Winters are dry and warm. Temperatures rise until May. The monsoon season runs from May through October, with heavy rain and somewhat cooler temperatures during the day, although nights remain warm. Climate statistics: the maximum temperature is 42.8 °C (109.0 °F) in April and the lowest temperature is 17.5 °C (63.5 °F) in January. The highest average temperature is 35.7 °C (96.3 °F) and the minimum average temperature is 25.2 °C (77.4 °F). Annual total rainfall was 1,225 millimetres (48.2 in) with total 109 rainy days. Maximum daily rainfall was 68.1 mm (2.68 in) on October 2, 2024.

== History ==
The city dates back to a settlement founded by Mon migrating from Mottama (Thai: เมาะตะมะ) in Myanmar around 1650. The original name was Sam Khok. In 1815, King Rama II visited the city and the citizens offered him many lotus flowers, which prompted the king to rename the city Pathum Thani, meaning 'lotus flower town'.

== Symbols ==
The provincial seal shows a pink lotus flower with two rice stalks bending over it, representing the fertility of the province. The provincial tree is the Indian coral tree (Erythrina variegata). The provincial flower is the lotus (Nymphaea lotus). The provincial aquatic animal is the marble goby (Oxyeleotris marmorata).

== Demographics ==
=== Population ===
Population history of Pathum Thani province is as follows:

1947	1960	1970	1980	1990	2000	2010	2200
139,339	190,000	233,000	324,468	452,639	677,649	1,327,147	1,176,412

=== Religion ===
There are total 201 Theravada Buddhist temples in the province, of which 172 Maha Nikai and 29 Dhammayut temples.

44	Mueang Pathum Thani	39	Sam Khok	35	Lam Luk Ka	30	Khlong Luang
24	Nong Suea	19	Lat Lum Kaeo	10	Thanyaburi

Further there are 39 Cristian churches and 32 Mosques in the province.

== Education and technology ==
Pathum Thani has a very high concentration of higher education institutions, especially ones in the field of science and technology. This, together with a large number of industrial parks and research facilities (including those in Thailand Science Park), make the region the educational and technology hub of the area.

Academic institutes
National Science Museum, Asian Institute of Technology, Bangkok University (Rangsit Campus), Eastern Asia University, North Bangkok University (Rangsit), Pathumthani University, Rajamangala University of Technology, Rangsit University, Shinawatra University, Sirindhorn International Institute of Technology, Thammasat University (Rangsit Center), and Valaya Alongkorn Rajahbhat University

Research bodies
Thailand Science Park, National Science and Technology Development Agency (NSTDA), National Center for Genetic Engineering and Biotechnology (BIOTEC), National Metal and Materials Technology Center (MTEC), National Nanotechnology Center (NANOTEC), National Electronics and Computer Technology Center (NECTEC), Thailand Institute of Scientific and Technological Research (TISTR)

Industrial parks
Software Park Thailand (in Nonthaburi, southwest of Pathum Thani), Nava Nakorn Industrial Promotion Zone (1376 acres / 5.6 km^{2}), Bangkadi Industrial Park (470 acres / 1.9 km^{2}), Techno Thani (a "Technology City" administered by the Ministry of Science and Technology), and a number of industrial parks in neighboring Ayutthaya and Nonthaburi provinces.

== Administrative divisions ==
=== Provincial government ===
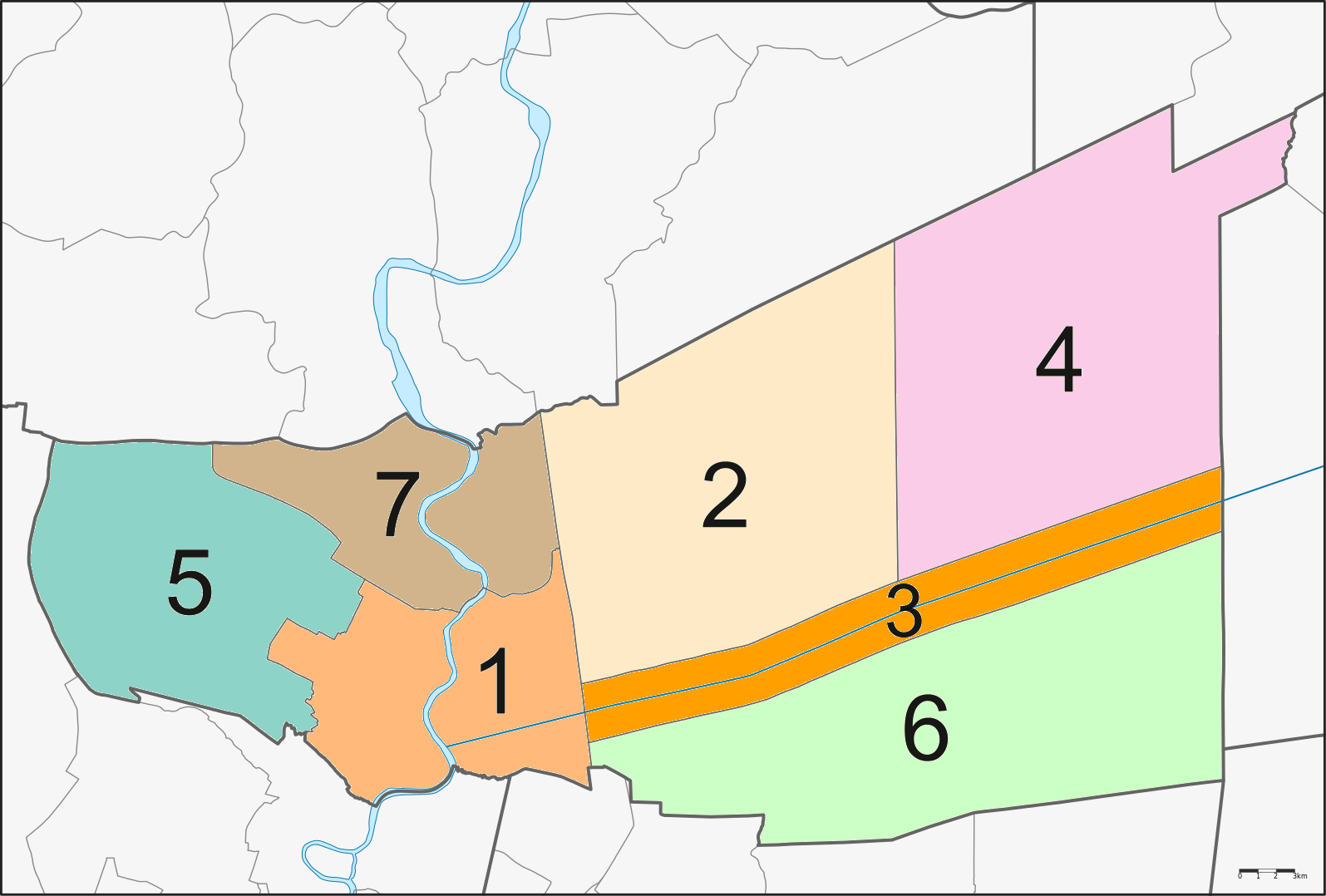
Map of Pathum Thani province with districts

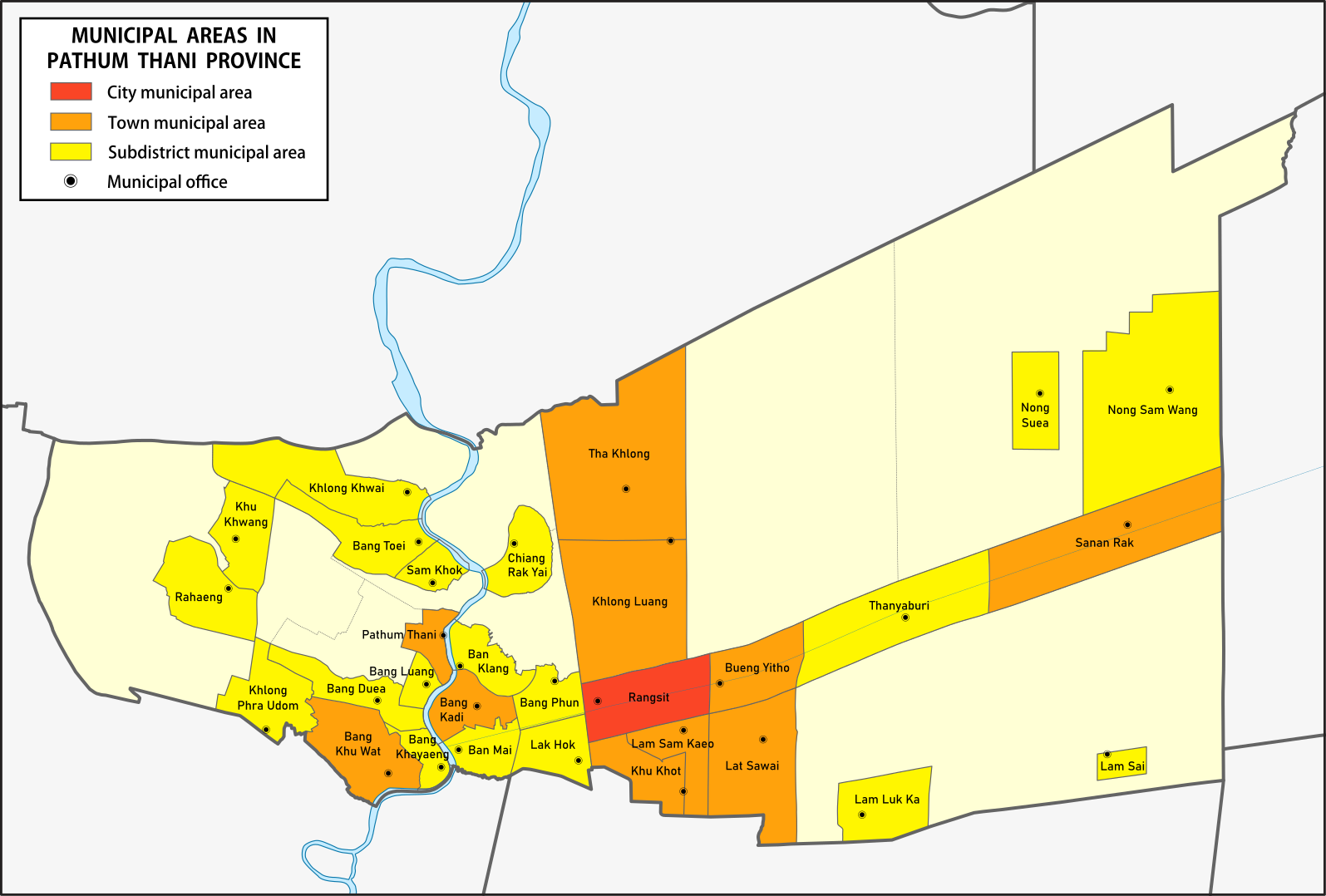
City municipalities (thesaban nakhon) Town municipalities (thesaban mueang) Subdistrict municipalities (thesaban tambon)

The province is divided into seven districts (amphoes). The districts are further subdivided into 60 communes (tambons) and 529 villages (mubans).

1. Mueang Pathum Thani
2. Khlong Luang
3. Thanyaburi
4. Nong Suea
5. Lat Lum Kaeo
6. Lam Luk Ka
7. Sam Khok

=== Local government ===
As of 29 September 2020 there are: one Pathum Thani Provincial Administrative Organization - PAO (ongkan borihan suan changwat) and twenty-nine municipal (thesaban) areas in the province. Rangsit has city (thesaban nakhon) status. Further ten have town (thesaban mueang) status and eighteen subdistrict municipalities (thesaban tambon).

City municipality	1	Rangsit	85,260

	Town mun.	People			
1	Tha Khlong	78,108	6	Bueng Yi Tho	32,708
2	Lam Sam Kaeo	66,003	7	Sanan Rak	31,350
3	Lat Sawai	65,906	8	Bang Khu Wat	28,349
4	Khlong Luang	62,615	9	Pathum Thani	23,633
5	Khu Khot	44,274	10	Bang Kadi	13,987

	Subdistrict mun.	People			
1	Thanyaburi	62,990	10	Bang Toei	10,828
2	Bang Phun	25,509	11	Rahaeng	10,445
3	Lak Hok	21,883	12	Khlong Phra Udom	7,995
4	Lam Luk Ka	18,377	13	Sam Khok	6,963
5	Bang Duea	14,756	14	Bang Luang	6,314
6	Bang Khayaeng	14,557	15	Chiang Rak Yai	6,260
7	Ban Mai	14,447	16	Khu Khwang	6,000
8	Ban Klang	12,326	17	Lam Sai	2,657
9	Nong Sam Wang	11,016	18	Nong Suea	2,901

The non-municipal areas are administered by 35 Subdistrict Administrative
Organizations - SAO (ongkan borihan suan tambon).

Municipalities	Communities
Rangsit	81
Lam Sam Kaeo	70
Khlong Luang	54
Khu Khot	31
Bueng Yi Tho	37
Pathum Thani	28
Bang Kadi	18

== Education ==
=== Higher education ===
- 10 higher education entities with 141,616 students.

=== Vocational education ===
- 7 vocational colleges with 10,205 students.

=== Secondary education ===
- 47 upper secondary schools with 26,420 students.
- 52 lower secondary schools with 37,691 students.

=== Primary education ===
- 175 primary schools with 76,583 pupils.

== Health ==
=== Government hospitals ===
There are ten government hospitals in Pathum Thani province, of which Mueang Pathum Thani district has one general hospital:

- Pathum Thani Hospital with 456 beds.

There are seven community hospitals in the other six districts:

Thanyaburi Hospital	120 beds	Khlong Luang Hospital	62 beds	Lat Lum Kaeo Hospital	48 beds
Lam Luk Ka Hospital	46 beds	Prachathipat Hospital	37 beds	Sam Khok Hospital	36 beds
Nong Suea Hospital	35 beds

There are also:

- Thammasat University Hospital with 844 bed in Khlong Luang district.
- Maha Vajiralongkorn Cancer Centre with 116 beds in Thanyaburi district.

=== Private hospitals ===
There are twelve private hospitals in Pathum Thani province:

Mueang Pathum Thani	Krung Siam St.Carlos Medical Centre	100 beds
Mueang Pathum Thani	Krungthai Pathum Hospital	30 beds
Khlong Luang	Karunvech Hospital	200 beds
Khlong Luang	Phatara-Thonburi Hospital	120 beds
Khlong Luang	Thonburi Burana Hospital	55 beds
Thanyaburi	Pathumvech Hospital	200 beds
Thanyaburi	Bangpakok Rangsit 2 Hospital	100 beds
Thanyaburi	Paolo Rangsit Hospital	88 beds
Lam Luk Ka	PatRangsit Hospital	201 beds
Lam Luk Ka	CGH Lamlukka Hospital	100 beds
Lam Luk Ka	Symphaet Lamlukka Hospital	100 beds
Lam Luk Ka	PatRangsit 2 Hospital	59 beds

=== Health promoting hospitals ===
There are total 79 health-promoting hospitals in the province, of which: 17 in Mueang Pathum Thani, 13 in Khlong Luang, 4 in Thanyaburi, 9 in Nong Suea, 11 in Lat Lum Kaeo, 14 in Lam Luk Ka and 11 in Sam Khok districts.

=== Clinics ===
Around 626 clinics are in Pathum Thani province, of which 105 clinics in Mueang Pathum Thani, 182 Khlong Luang, 162 Thanyaburi, 9 Lat Lum Kaeo, 150 Lam Luk Ka and 18 Sam Khok districts.

== Economy ==
=== Economic output ===
In 2023, Pathum Thani province had an economic output of 460.312 billion baht (US$12.11 billion). This amounts to per capita gross provincial product (GPP) of 246,463 baht (US$6,485). In 2025 the total workforce was 1,203,933 of which 1,188,321 persons were employed in economic activity. In agriculture and fishery 28,226 persons (2.4%) were employed and in the non-agricultural sector 1,160,095 persons (97.6%).

Gross Provincial Product (GPP)
	Activities	Million Baht	Percent
1	Manufacturing	214,563	46.6
2	Trade	74,505	16.2
3	Finance	24,421	5.3
4	Education	22,108	4.8
5	Energy	20,593	4.5
6	Real estate	20,218	4.4
7	Construction	10,714	2.3
8	Transportation	10,515	2.3
9	Defence / publ.admin.	9,682	2.1
10	Human Health	9,421	2.0
11	Other service activity	8,555	1.8
12	Agriculture	6,618	1.4
13	Accommodation / food	6,299	1.4
14	Administration	6,239	1.4
15	Scientific activity	6,229	1.4
16	Information	5,807	1.3
17	Water supply	2,601	0.6
18	Pastime	1,140	0.2
19	Mining	83	-
	Total	460,312	100

Employed persons
	Activities	Workforce	Percent
1	Manufacturing	364,388	30.7
2	Trade	232,882	19.6
3	Accommodation / food	98,184	8.3
4	Transportation	84,802	7.1
5	Construction	70,823	6.0
6	Other service activity	54,695	4.6
7	Defence / publ.admin.	44,201	3.7
8	Human health	36,991	3.1
9	Education	34,159	2.9
10	Agriculture	28,226	2.4
11	Finance	26,543	2.2
12	Scientific activity	26,013	2.2
13	Real estate	18,868	1.6
14	Pastime	17,623	1.5
15	Household enterprise	15,335	1.3
16	Administration	14,200	1.2
17	Information	13,494	1.1
18	Water supply	2,818	0.2
19	Energy	2,498	0.2
20	Extraterritorial org. activity	1,578	0.1
	Total	1,188,321	100

=== Manufacturing ===
The biggest sector of the economy generated 214.563 billion baht (US$5.65 billion) or 46.6% of GPP with 6,2202 registered entities and a workforce of 364,388 people (30.7% of all employed persons).

=== Trade ===
Wholesale and retail trade; repair of motor vehicles and motorcycles, the second sector of the economy generated 74.505 billion baht (US$2 billion) or 16.2% of GPP with 20,686 registered entities and a workforce of 232,882 people (19.6%).

=== Construction ===
2,393 construction entities and a workforce of 70,823 people (6%) contributed 10.7 billion baht (US$282 million) or 2.3% of GPP.

=== Agriculture ===
Agriculture and fishery in Pathum Thani province, the twelfth sector of the economy, generated 6.618 billion baht (US$174 million) or 1.4% of GPP with a workforce of 28,226 (2.4% of all employed persons).

Agricultural land use 816 km^{2} (315 sq mi) is 53.5% of total land of Pathum Thani province 1,525 km^{2} (589 sq mi). This is divided as follows: paddy land: 530 km^{2} (200 sq mi) 34.8%, farmland: 199 km^{2} (77 sq mi) 13%, orchard/perennial crop: 59 km^{2} (23 sq mi) 3.9%, and vegetable/ornamental plant: 28 km^{2} (11 sq mi) 1.8%.

Production of the three main arable crops: rice 368,663 tonnes, cassave 2,865 tonnes and sugarcane 1,192 tonnes.

Production of the eight main vegetable crops: lemon grass 3,916 tonnes, lettuce 3,439 tonnes, water spinach 2,871 tonnes, holy basil 2,336 tonnes, Chinese kale 2,046 tonnes, yard long bean 1,527 tonnes, galangal 1,240 tonnes and pakchoi 1,237 tonnes.

Production of the five main fruit crops: lady finger banana 32,978 tonnes, banana 26,608 tonnes; coconut 7,120 tonnes, mango 2,693 tonnes and jack fruit 2,000 tonnes.

Agricultural commodity produced in significant amount is oil palm 12,120 tonnes.

=== Animal husbandry ===
Livestock produced included: chickens 381,688, ducks 216,377, beef cattle 4,752, goats 3,158, buffalos 770 and sheep 343.

=== Fisheries ===
Total catch from 2,747 freshwater aquaculture farms amounted to 27,400 tonnes.

== Tourism ==
There were 2,961 hotel rooms in 2024; about 3,455,846 people of which 3,068,553 Thai (88.8%) visited Pathum Thani province and contributed 5,649 million baht (US$161 million) to tourism revenues.

== Human achievement index 2022 ==
Health	Education	Employment	Income
2	20	15	32
Housing	Family	Transport	Participation
71	23	4	71
Province Pathum Thani, with an HAI 2022 value of 0.6589 is "somewhat high", occupies place 15 in the ranking.

Since 2003, United Nations Development Programme (UNDP) in Thailand has tracked progress on human development at sub-national level using the Human achievement index (HAI), a composite index covering all the eight key areas of human development. National Economic and Social Development Board (NESDB) has taken over this task since 2017.

Rank	Classification
1 - 13	"high"
14 - 29	"somewhat high"
30 - 45	"average"
46 - 61	"somewhat low"
62 - 77	"low"

Map with provinces and HAI 2022 rankings
