= Petch Osathanugrah =

Thai businessman and singer (1954–2023)

- เพชร โอสถานุเคราะห์
- Born: 21 August 1954; Phra Nakhon, Bangkok, Thailand
- Died: 14 August 2023 (aged 68); Bangkok, Thailand
- Father: Surat Osathanugrah

Petch Osathanugrah (Thai: เพชร โอสถานุเคราะห์; 21 August 1954 – 14 August 2023) was a Thai businessman and singer-songwriter.

== Life and career ==
Born in Bangkok, Osathanugrah graduated in marketing from Southern Illinois University, and then worked in the advertising sector of his family-owned beverage company Osotspa, of which he later become CEO. In 1987, he got a large success as a singer with the pop song "เพียงชายคนนี้ (ไม่ใช่ผู้วิเศษ)"/ "I'm just a man (Mai Chai Phoo Wiset)".

Osathanugrah also served as president of Bangkok University, where he opened the courses to new disciplines and innovative subject areas like digital marketing, financial and investment planning, video games and interactive media production, event management. During his career he also founded the advertising agency Spa Advertising (now Spa-Hakuhodo), established the women's magazine น์ผู้หญิงวันนี้ ('Women Today'), and created a television program with the same name.

An avid art collector whose collection includes paintings by Damien Hirst and Pablo Picasso, Osathanugrah founded the Dib International Contemporary Art Museum, which opened in December 2025. Suffering from iron overload and diabetes, he died in his sleep on 14 August 2023, at the age of 68. At the time of his death, he was among the 30 richest people in Thailand.
