= Norraphat Vilaiphan =

Thai actor

- Born: 23 December 1997 (age 28); Bangkok, Thailand
- Other names: Bright Norraphat Vilaiphan, Brightnorr
- Education: Sirindhorn International Institute of Technology; Bangkok University
- Occupations: Actor, YouTuber
- Years active: 2017–present
- Height: 1.85 m (6 ft 1 in)

Norraphat Vilaiphan, also called Bright (ไบร์ท) Norraphat Vilaiphan or Brightnorr, is a Thai actor. Two of his best-known roles include Dok Keao Kalong (ดอกแก้วกาหลง) and Nattaya Thongsen.

== Early life ==
Vilaiphan was born on 23 December 1997 in Bangkok, Thailand. He graduated Suankularb Wittayalai Rangsit School and studied in Sirindhorn International Institute of Technology. As of 2022, he is a student at Bangkok University.

== Filmography ==
=== Television ===
Year	Title	Production company/ Television Network	Role	Type
2017	Dok Kaeo Kalong (ดอกแก้วกาหลง)	The One Enterprise/One 31	ชิตตะวัน วรินทร์ญาดา	
2018	Sai Ruk Sai Sawaat 2018 (สายรักสายสวาท)	The One Enterprise/One 31	Thana (ธนา มหทรัพย์)	Cameo
2018	Nakark Kaew (หน้ากากแก้ว)	The One Enterprise-Wonjin/One 31	ดินแดน สินธร (ดิน)	
2018	Song Kram Nak Pun (สงครามนักปั้น)	The One Enterprise/One 31	Norraphat Vilaiphan (นรภัทร วิไลพันธุ์)	Cameo
2018	Mueng Maya Live The Series Part 5: Game Gon Maya (เมืองมายา Live ตอน เกมกลมายา)	The One Enterprise/One 31	Anuta / Tai (อนุธา นทีประเสริฐ / ไทม์	
2019	Heeb Lorn Sorn Winyarn 2019 (หีบหลอนซ่อนวิญญาณ)	The One Enterprise/One 31	ร.ต.ท.พรรษา วงศ์กุศล	
2020	Jao Mae Asorapit (อสรพิษ)	The One Enterprise/One 31	Prince Chaiyawong (Past) / Sarath (Present) (เจ้าไชยะวงศ์ (อดีต) / สารัช (ปัจจุบัน)	
2020	Pen Tor (เป็นต่อ ตอน ขุนทวงแค้น)	The One Enterprise/One 31	Khun (ขุน (วัยรุ่น))	Cameo
2021	Ley Luang (เล่ห์ลวง)	The One Enterprise/One 31	Fin (อรุษ เอื้อดำรงค์ (ฟิน))	
2021	Hongsutai Maai Layk 6 (ห้องสุดท้ายหมายเลข 6)	The One Enterprise-Por Dee Kam/One 31	Pole Star / Psychopomp (ดาวเหนือ / ยมทูต)	
2022	Phit Rak Roi Adeet (พิษรักรอยอดีต)	The One Enterprise/One 31	Chayodom (Cho) (ชโยดม (โช))	
2022	Dtai Laah (ใต้หล้า)	The One Enterprise/One 31	Hiran Khaokhulab (Ran) (หิรัญ เขากุหลาบ (รัญ))	

== MC ==
Online

- 20 : On Air YouTube: Brightnorr Channel

He was an MC.
