= Traffy Fondue =

Civic engagement platform in Thailand

- Developer: National Electronics and Computer Technology Center (NECTEC)
- Release: 2022
- Platform: Web, LINE
- Type: Civic engagement platform
- Website: traffy.in.th

Traffy Fondue (Thai: ทราฟฟี่ฟองดูว์) is a digital platform developed by Thailand's National Electronics and Computer Technology Center (NECTEC), under the National Science and Technology Development Agency (NSTDA). It allows residents and visitors to report urban infrastructure issues—such as potholes, garbage, broken streetlights, or flooding—to the appropriate local authorities. The platform uses artificial intelligence to categorize and route complaints, aiming to improve efficiency, transparency, and citizen engagement. "Traffy" is derived from traffic, while "fondue" is derived from the Thai "fongdu", meaning "to report".

== Overview ==
Traffy Fondue was developed by Dr. Wasan Pattara-Atikom, a principal researcher at the National Electronics and Computer Technology Center (NECTEC). The platform evolved from his earlier project, Traffy Waste, which used IoT and AI technologies to improve garbage collection efficiency in the Phuket Smart City initiative.

After originally developed as part of a Phuket Smart City development in 2008, Traffy Fondue was launched to support the Thai government's push toward nationwide smart city solutions and improved public service delivery. It was championed by Bangkok governor Chadchart Sittipunt. It is particularly popular in Bangkok, where it is used by the Bangkok Metropolitan Administration (BMA) to address a wide range of civic issues. Traffy Fondue uses AI to automatically classify user-submitted issues and direct them to the correct government department or agency. The service is accessible via the LINE messaging app and a website. Users receive updates on the progress and resolution of their reports. In April 2024, a tourist-friendly English version was launched allowing non-Thai speakers to report issues as well.

== Adoption and impact ==
As of May 2025, Traffy Fondue has been adopted by over 17,000 organizations throughout Thailand, receiving more than 1.37 million reports. The platform claims a resolution rate of 77%. In Bangkok, over 865,000 issues were reported since mid-2022, with more than 700,000 cases resolved.

The system has been credited with increasing civic participation and enabling data-driven decision-making in urban governance.

== See also ==
- Smart city
- E-Government
