= Puwanai Sangwan =

Thai actor

- Born: Puwanai Sangwan; 26 October 1995 (age 30); Bangkok, Thailand
- Other names: O; โอ; Oreo
- Education: Bangkok University, Faculty of Communication Arts (Broadcasting)
- Occupations: Actor; Model
- Years active: 2017–present
- Known for: What The Duck The Series (2018); What The Duck: Final Call (2019)
- Height: 1.73 m (5 ft 8 in)

Puwanai Sangwan (Thai: ภูวนัย แสงวรรณ์; born 26 October 1995) is a Thai actor. He is well-known for his roles in My Only 12% (2022) and Ai Long Nhai (2022).

== Filmography ==
Television

Year	Title	Role	Production	Network
2018	What The Duck The Series	Pop	Jinloe Media Work	Line TV
2019	What The Duck: Final Call	Pop	Jinloe Media Work	Line TV
2019	War of High School 2 Reborn	Peem	Jinloe Media Work	Line TV
2019	Puppy Love		Jinloe Media Work	Line TV
