= Thailand Graduate Institute of Science and Technology =

- สถาบันบัณฑิตวิทยาศาสตร์และเทคโนโลยีไทย
- Established: 1998
- Affiliations: National Science and Technology Development Agency, cooperate with Asian Institute of Technology, Sirindhorn International Institute of Technology and Thammasat University
- Location: Thailand; 14.080911°N 100.604065°E
- Nickname: TGIST
- Website: https://www.nstda.or.th/tgist

The Thailand Graduate Institute of Science and Technology (TGIST) or in Thai "สถาบันบัณฑิตวิทยาศาสตร์และเทคโนโลยีไทย" established in 1998 by National Science and Technology Development Agency to develop expertise in science and technology and bridge the gap between industry and academia.

== Partners ==
This is not a comprehensive list

- National Science and Technology Development Agency
- North Bangkok Cluster
  - Thailand Science Park
  - Asian Institute of Technology
  - Sirindhorn International Institute of Technology
  - Thammasat University, Rangsit Centre
