= NECTEC =

Thai government organization

National Electronics and Computer Technology Center
- ศูนย์เทคโนโลยีอิเล็กทรอนิกส์และคอมพิวเตอร์แห่งชาติ

Agency overview
- Formed: 16 September 1986 (40 years ago)
- Headquarters: Thailand Science Park, Khlong Luang, Pathum Thani; 14.0777°N 100.6013°E
- Parent agency: National Science and Technology Development Agency
- Website: www.nectec.or.th

Thailand's National Electronics and Computer Technology Center (NECTEC) is a statutory government organization under the National Science and Technology Development Agency (NSTDA), Ministry of Higher Education, Science, Research and Innovation. Its main responsibilities are to undertake, support, and promote the development of electronic, computing, telecommunication, and information technologies through research and development activities. NECTEC also disseminates and transfers such technologies for contribution to the economic growth and social development in the country, following the National Economic and Social Development Plan.

== History ==
NECTEC was founded by the Thailand Ministry of Science, Technology and Energy on 16 September 1986. It was converted into a national centre specializing in electronics hardware and software in under National Science and Technology Development Agency. It was deemed a new agency following the enactment of the Science and Technology Development Act of 1991.

As of 2018 NECTEC's executive director is Dr Sarun Sumriddetchkajorn.

== Mission ==
NECTEC contributes to the development of Thailand's capability in electronics and computer technologies through:

1. Research, development, design and engineering
2. Technology transfer to industries and communities
3. Human resource development
4. Policy research and industrial intelligence and knowledge infrastructure

== Departments ==
- Optical and Quantum Communication Lab
- Intelligent Devices and Systems Research Unit
- Green Testing Development Lab
- Nano-Electronics and MEMS lab
- Photonics Technology lab
- Information Technology Management Division
- Human Language Technology
- Open Source Software LAb
- Organization and Strategic Planning and Evaluation Division.
- Human Resource and Organization Development Section
- Strategic Program Management Section
- Policy Research Division
- Public Relations Section
- R&D Services and support Section
- Platform Technology Program Management Division
- Rehabilitative Engineering and Assistive Technology Institute
- Information Security Infrastructure and Services
- Embedded Systems Technology Lab
- Industrial control and Automation Lab
- Software Engineering Lab
- Integrated Circuits Design Section

== Products ==
- TVIS is an automatic system that reports traffic information in Bangkok.
- Ya&You: It is the application for searching and providing the knowledge of medicine and health information to promote the use of drugs and healthcare properly.
- Traffy bSafe for Android is a free application where users can download to make a complaint and report dangerous driving behaviour of public transportation such as vans and buses.
- tangmoChecker: It is an application for checking the ripeness of watermelons
- NVIS: It is an automatic system that reads out loud online news for a user.
- FFC: Family Folder Collector: The purpose of this application is for healthcare personnel to collect household information when going out to the village for data collection.
- Smart Sensor:A prototyping platform for Android application and Smart Sensor Device communicate via Bluetooth.
- Drift:This application monitors a user's activity during the day. It classifies a user's activity into sleeping (phone is not with user), resting (phone is with user while doing no or minimal activity, walking (user is walking), or driving (user is taking transportation).
- Floodsign:FloodSign is a tool used to report flooding stain levels in Thailand's 2011 floods.
- Traffy Fondue: an application for reporting problems such as potholes and flooding
- Thai School Lunch : Automated Lunch Menu Recommendation System for Schools

== Impact ==
NECTEC has used green technology in the field of printing. This has led to the foundation of Thailand Organic and Printed Electronics Innovation Centre (TOPIC). NECTEC along with public and private sectors have researched the technical feasibility of using organic electronics in printing ink. It has successfully developed graphene-based conductive ink in 2011. The ink has five times more conductivity than a typical ink. It is also cheap, contains no contamination, and is suitable for various applications. It has also developed a software called "Size-Thai" that uses 3-D body scan to measure the anatomical dimensions of Thai people. This makes Thailand the second nation in Asia to use such a software after Japan. It is expected to reduce wastage and help garment retailers to reduce losses. It also has business applications like "virtual-try on" and "made to measure".
