= Sirindhorn International Institute of Technology =

Institute of technology in Thailand

Coordinates: 14°04′25.68″N 100°36′51.66″E

Sirindhorn International Institute of Technology, Thammasat University
- สถาบันเทคโนโลยีนานาชาติสิรินธร มหาวิทยาลัยธรรมศาสตร์
- Type: Public
- Established: 1992
- Affiliations: LAOTSE, DAAD's IQN
- Director: Kriengsak Panuwatwanich
- Faculty: ~75 teaching staff, of which 52 are faculties. With ~80 adjunct faculties.
- Undergraduates: 2,345
- Postgraduates: 352
- Location: Pathum Thani, Thailand
- Campus: Suburb, Thammasat-Rangsit and Bangkadi
- Website: www.siit.tu.ac.th

Sirindhorn International Institute of Technology (Thai: สถาบันเทคโนโลยีนานาชาติสิรินธร) (SIIT) is a semi-autonomous institute of technology established in 1992 within Thammasat University. It is located in Pathum Thani, Thailand. One of Thailand's research universities, it offers science, technology and engineering education, as well as related management programs. All are international programs, with English language as a medium of instruction. The institute is part of the Links to Asia by Organizing Traineeship and Student Exchange network, an international consortium of universities in Europe and Asia. Although it is an academic unit of Thammasat University and its graduates receive Thammasat University degrees, the institute is self-administered and self-financed.

== History ==
During the ninth Japan-Thailand Joint Trade and Economic Committee Meeting held in Kobe, Japan in 1989, all the delegates from the Japan Federation of Economic Organizations (Keidanren) and the Federation of Thai Industries (FTI) realized that to enhance industrial development of Thailand, engineers with working knowledge of English are needed. Therefore, it was recommended that engineering programs, where all lecture and laboratory courses would be taught in English by highly qualified faculty members with doctoral degrees, be established.

A cooperation agreement among Keidanren, FTI, and Thammasat University was reached in 1992 to establish bachelor's degree programs in engineering at Thammasat University with initial funds provided by Keidanren and FTI. After two years of operation, the International Institute of Technology (IIT) was founded on 16 September 1994. Maha Chakri Sirindhorn presided over the cornerstone-laying ceremony of a new building at the Rangsit Center of Thammasat University using part of the initial fund. Then, on 28 June 1996, King Bhumibol Adulyadej granted the institute a new name: Sirindhorn International Institute of Technology (SIIT). On 2 October 1997, Princess Maha Chakri Sirindhorn presided over the inauguration ceremony of its name and building. In June 2001, former Prime Minister Anand Panyarachun inaugurated a new campus at Bangkadi Industrial Park.

== Administrative independence ==
Although it is a unit of Thammasat University, SIIT is financially and administratively separate from the central university system. SIIT's policies and operations are guided and supervised by the Board of Trustees which consists of representatives from Thammasat University, FTI, Nippon Keidanren, and scholars appointed by the university. In addition, the Academic Review Committee (ARC) provides guidance and recommendations on academic and research matters. The institute, headed by the director, consists of four administrative divisions, a library, and information services center, and six academic schools, with 15 academic programs.

As the institute is an autonomous (semi-private) body of Thammasat University, it gets no funding from the state and needs to find and manage its own income and spending. To start its operation, the institute received initial funds from Keidanren and FTI. Parts of funding are research grants and scholarships from international organizations like Asian Development Bank, local ones like industries, and the Thailand Research Fund, and individual contributions. The rest of funding is from tuition fees.

== Academics ==
All faculty members are doctoral degree holders, with strong research and/or industrial experiences. The institute is considered among academic peers as a research intensive engineering school. On average, each year each SIIT faculty member produces twice the highest value of national range for international journal publications (0.74 vs 0–0.41).

In 2007, the Thailand Research Fund assessed research outcomes of universities in Thailand, and SIIT ranked as "very good" for all three indicators, making it the only engineering school in the country to achieve this.

As few prospective students can afford considerably higher tuition fees, the institute initially faced difficulty recruiting undergraduate students with high test scores. While scholarships and special recruitment programs do help attract many bright students, its average admission scores are unacceptably low compared to other science and engineering programs in the country. Due to the lower admission scores, the school is comparatively easy to enroll in. The average admission score of admitted students is among the lowest among engineering students. However, most of the low-performance students will be disqualified. The unqualified or unsatisfied academic competency students will be expelled within a first or second year which occurred about 50% of entry students.

The undergraduate recruitment situation is improving, especially for its computer, IT, and management-related majors, which now have higher average admission scores. With its strong science and technology education, the institute has been selected, along with Mahidol University and Chulalongkorn University, by Thailand National Science and Technology Development Agency (NSTDA), as a destination of selected group of top students from Mahidol Wittayanusorn School and 12 Princess Chulaporn Schools for Science, the country's science schools for gifted students, in a program to mentor junior researchers for national science and technology development.

For its graduate levels, the institute attracts bright graduates, as the institute gains supports from many national and international bodies (and use that as scholarships for graduate students). SIIT is one of a very small number of universities that can secure numbers of Thailand Research Fund's Royal Golden Jubilee grants, considered to be the country's most prestigious research grants for PhD students, for every single year since the program began in 1998 — one of the only three that can secure engineering discipline grants that often.

=== Schools ===
A number of undergraduate and research-based graduate programs are offered from six schools.

School of Bio-Chemical Engineering and Technology
hosts Chemical Engineering programs
School of Civil Engineering and Technology
hosts Civil Engineering programs
School of Information, Computer and Communication Technology
hosts Computer Engineering, Digital Engineering, and Electrical Engineering programs
School of Management Technology
hosts Business and Supply Chain Analytics program
School of Manufacturing Systems and Mechanical Engineering
hosts Industrial Engineering and Logistics Systems, and Mechanical Engineering programs
School of Integrated Science and Innovation

== Cooperations ==
The institute enjoys a strong link with many universities, remarkably with its neighbor Asian Institute of Technology (AIT) and a group of Japanese universities and research centers, as well as a network of European universities such as DAAD International Quality Network (IQN) program and LAOTSE network. Locally, a remarkable collaborative network is the Joint Graduate School of Energy and Environment, a group of leading Thai universities in environmental and energy technology area.

The institute established faculty member and student exchange programs, as well as internship programs, with universities and organizations in Asia, Australia, Europe, and North America. These programs allow faculty members to collaborate with their counterparts in research projects, and students to have an opportunity to take engineering courses at these universities. Additionally, qualified foreign professors are regularly invited to visit and conduct courses at SIIT.

Because of their proximity, SIIT, Thammasat University, AIT, Thailand Science Park, and research centers of NSTDA, share some of their facilities, including libraries and laboratories, with each other. In 1998, the Thailand Graduate Institute of Science and Technology (TGIST) was established by NSTDA to further strengthen its collaboration with academics and industries; SIIT is among three major academic institutes in TGIST's "Thailand Science Park Collaboration".

In 2007, SIIT joined NSTDA, King Mongkut's Institute of Technology Ladkrabang, and Tokyo Institute of Technology as founding members in the establishment of Thailand Advanced Institute of Science and Technology. This joint graduate school will offer international postgraduate degrees, where faculty staffs will come from Tokyo Tech, NSTDA, and Thai universities.

== Campuses ==
Operations of SIIT are carried out at two locations: Thammasat University's Rangsit Center and Bangkadi, both in Pathum Thani, surrounded by many national research centers, high-tech industrial parks, and universities, as well as Thailand Science Park and National Science Museum. The area is now known as the "Technology Cluster of North Bangkok".

=== Rangsit Campus ===
The Rangsit Campus is situated in the TU's Rangsit Center, approximately 42 kilometers north of Bangkok, just next to the Asian Institute of Technology and Thailand Science Park. The center served as the main host for the 13th Asian Games in 1998 and the World University Games in 2007.

=== Bangkadi Campus ===
Located in Bangkadi Industrial Park, the Bangkadi Campus is about 15 kilometers away southeast from the Rangsit Campus. The information technology program moved to this facility in June 2002. The management technology and the telecommunications programs moved to Bangkadi in May 2003. It houses all new ICT-related programs, for example, the computer science program. In June 2006, the new building Sirindhralai (Thai: สิรินธราลัย), the name graciously granted by Her Royal Highness Princess Maha Chakri Sirindhorn, was opened to accommodate the telecommunications, engineering management, and management technology programs.

== Research Centers and Units ==
Currently, there are 2 research centers and 7 research units affiliated with SIIT

=== Research Centers ===
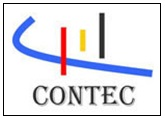
- Construction and Maintenance Technology Research Center (CONTEC)

The Construction and Maintenance Technology Research Center (CONTEC) is established mainly to carry out research and development projects on technologies required for solving problems and creating innovation in construction materials technologies and infrastructures.

- Transportation Research Center (TREC)

The Transportation Research Center (TREC) is a research and development center established on 18 December 2007 to conduct collaborative research among SIIT and related government organizations in the area of transportation and transportation, supporting technology.

=== Research units ===
- Biomedical Engineering Research Unit (BioMed SIIT)

Biomedical Engineering unit (BioMed SIIT) integrates fundamentals from engineering, computer science, medical science and mathematics to solve applied problems in medicine and biology.

- Computational Engineering and Science (CES) Research Unit

Nowadays, the advancement of computational theories and computing technologies allows complex physical problems that are inaccessible to analytical and experimental approaches to be solved by computers. The research unit for computational engineering and science (CES) conducts research related to this relatively new interdisciplinary field.

- Intelligent Informatics and Service Innovation Unit (IISI-U)

The IISI-U integrates fundamentals for solving advanced problems in engineering, science and social issues, and then provides those solutions as services. The IISI research unit contributes to advancement of intelligent informatics fields, such as artificial intelligence, data mining, and soft computing which leads to breakthrough solutions for issues that human factors are significantly involved. These innovations can be used as services to various societies and industries.

- Intelligent Infrastructure (INFRA) Research Unit

Throughout history infrastructures such as transportation systems, water supplies, electrical grids, telecommunication systems, etc. have had large scale impact on society and economy. Nowadays, challenges are how to apply advanced technologies in the digital age to planning, design, operation, and management of infrastructures in smart ways. This could provide in long term the economical, efficient, convenient, comfortable, and environmental friendly way of living.

- Logistics and Supply Chain Systems Engineering (LogEn) Research Unit

Logistics and Supply Chain Systems Engineering (LogEn) Research Unit address cutting-edge supply-chain problems and advanced research in the area of logistics, and supply chain system with the emphasis on optimization, production planning, scheduling simulation, inventory management, forecasting, quality management, lean management and operations management.

- Materials and Plasma Technology (MaP Tech) Research Unit

The Materials and Plasma Technology (MaP Tech) research unit aims to carry out wide areas of research in materials with emphasis on development, designs, computational analysis, manufacturing, testing, and applications of plastics, rubbers, and nanomaterials. The applications of plasma for use in various fields, especially agricultural and biomedical applications are also a main focus.

- Sustainable Energy and Low Carbon (SELC) Research Unit

Challenges of global climate change, energy insecurity and economic growth can only be solved with rapid development of low carbon technologies and management. There are a wide range of technologies at various stages of development that could contribute to energy and environmental goals. However, they are not being developed at the rate required due to a combination of technological, skill, financial, commercial and regulatory barriers.

== Notable alumni ==
- Yuan-Ming (David) Chang, Former CEO and Board Member, Suunto
- Professor Yodchanan Wongsawat, Thailand’s Minister of Higher Education, Science, Research and Innovation

== See also ==
- Education in Thailand — List of universities in Thailand
- Thammasat University — Nihon Keidanren — Federation of Thai Industries
- Education and Technology in Pathum Thani province
