= Osotspa =

Thai beverage company

- Type: Public
- Traded as: SET: OSP
- ISIN: TH8752010000
- Industry: Beverage
- Founded: 1891; 135 years ago
- Headquarters: Bang Kapi, Bangkok, Thailand
- Area served: Worldwide
- Key people: Petch Osathanugrah, chairman of the executive committee and CEO
- Website: osotspa.com

Osotspa Public Company Limited (Thai: บริษัท โอสถสภา จำกัด (มหาชน)) is a Thai beverage producer of drinks such as M-150 and Shark Energy. It is based in Bangkok.

== History ==
The origins of Osotspa date back to 1891. Founded by Chinese immigrants in Bangkok's Chinatown, the business was originally named Teck Heng Yoo before changing its name to Osotspa after World War II. King Vajiravudh granted the honorary surname of Osathanugrah, which means "provider of medicine" in Thai, to the founding family after one of their products helped end an outbreak of dysentery in the Thai army. The business is still family-owned.

In 1959, King Rama IX granted a royal warrant to the company, giving it permission to use the royal Garuda emblem. In 1965, the company began to import Lipovitan-D ("Lipo") energy drink from Japan's Taisho Pharmaceutical Company. Despite being classified as a pharmaceutical, it became very popular among working men. Osotspa began to manufacture the product under licence from Taisho Pharmaceutical in 1969.

In 1970, M-150 was launched, which became the most successful product of the company. In 1978, regulations were changed that reclassified pharmaceutical products as food and beverages. This created new opportunities for product development. As a result, Magnum, which contained more caffeine than Lipovitan-D, was launched in 1980. The market share of Osotspa increased along with total sales, and grew to 100 million bottles by 1989. The electrolyte drink M-Sport was launched in 1990, followed by Magnum 357 in 1998. The SHARK energy drink was launched in Austria the same year.

In 2000, SHARK Cool Bite was launched, globally under the name SHARK Energy. Hang was introduced in 2003 as a purported cure for hangovers. M-150 was also introduced in powdered form, with sales reaching 10 million sachets per month. M-Max was launched in 2004 and is only sold in Thailand. The following year SHARK Up and SHARK Lite were launched. In 2007, M-150 was launched to new markets in Europe and South America. This drink sold over 700 million units per year by 2008. This makes Osotspa the leading energy drink producer in Thailand, and one of the leading in the world.

As of 2010, Osotspa has offices in Innsbruck, Larnaca, Santiago de Compostela, Harlow, Essex, and Torrance, California. The company also plans to invest in Burma.

The company was listed on the Stock Exchange of Thailand in October 2018, helping boost the Osathanugrah family's net worth to $3 billion.
