= Thailand National Nanotechnology Center =

Thai research center

Coordinates: 14.079452°N 100.603835°E

- Industry: Nanotechnology
- Founded: 13 August 2003
- Headquarters: Thailand Science Park, Khlong Neung, Khlong Luang, Pathum Thani, Thailand
- Parent: National Science and Technology Development Agency
- Website: www2.nanotec.or.th

National Nanotechnology Center (NANOTEC) is one of Thailand's National Research Centers, directed by National Science and Technology Development Agency (NSTDA), Ministry of Higher Education, Science, Research and Innovation.

== See also ==
- Nanotechnology
- National Science and Technology Development Agency (NSTDA)
