= Dib International Contemporary Art Museum =

Coordinates: 13.7128°N 100.5796°E

Dib Bangkok
- Established: 21 December 2025
- Location: Bangkok, Thailand
- Type: Contemporary art museum
- Founder: Petch Osathanugrah

Dib Bangkok is a contemporary art museum in Bangkok, Thailand, opened in December 2025. The museum was founded by Thai businessman Petch Osathanugrah prior to his death in 2023, and is now led by his son Purat.

The museum will be housed in a 1980s-era warehouse in Khlong Toei district, and feature contemporary arts from both Thai and international artists.

== History ==
Dib Bangkok opened on 21 December 2025.
