= Joint Graduate School of Energy and Environment =

Coordinates: 13.648933°N 100.493247°E

The Joint Graduate School of Energy and Environment (JGSEE) (Thai: บัณฑิตวิทยาลัยร่วมด้านพลังงานและสิ่งแวดล้อม) is an autonomous graduate school, operating as a consortium of five Thai universities. Established in 1998, it aims to be an internationally recognized premier centre in graduate education and research in the fields of energy and environmental technologies. The school receives funding from the Thai government through the CHE–ADB Higher Education Development Project and the Energy Conservation Promotion Fund of Thailand's Ministry of Energy.

== Consortium ==
The school operates as a consortium involving King Mongkut's University of Technology Thonburi with partners from

- King Mongkut's Institute of Technology North Bangkok
- Chiang Mai University
- Sirindhorn International Institute of Technology at Thammasat University
- Prince of Songkhla University

== Academic programs ==
JGSEE offers three study programs leading to the degrees of :

- Master of Science (MSc)
- Master of Engineering (MEng)
- Research-based Master of Philosophy (MPhil)
- Doctor of Philosophy (PhD)

All programs are conducted in English by highly qualified local and international academic staff. The school operates on a bi-semester basis. Having completed the first semester of course work, students may choose to undertake their thesis study at any of the five partner institutions.

== See also ==
- List of universities in Thailand
