= Thailand Board of Investment =

- สำนักงานคณะกรรมการส่งเสริมการลงทุน

Agency overview
- Formed: July 21, 1966
- Jurisdiction: Kingdom of Thailand
- Headquarters: Bangkok, Thailand
- Agency executive: Narit Therdsteerasukdi, Secretary-General
- Parent agency: Office of the Prime Minister
- Website: Official website

The Thailand Board of Investment (BOI) or The Office of the Board of Investment is an agency of the Government of Thailand. Its mission is to promote foreign investment in Thailand by providing information, services, and incentives to interested foreign investors. The office operates under the aegis of the Prime Minister's Office. The BOI operates 14 offices in major world cities as well as regional offices throughout Thailand.

According to the Bank of Thailand (BOT) foreign direct investment (FDI) in Thailand in the first half of 2016 fell by more than 90 percent in value to US$347 million. The BOT said FDI declined from US$4.2 billion in the same period in 2015 to its lowest value since 2005.

== History and function ==
The Office of the Board of Investment or “BOI” was established in 1966 in accordance with the provisions of the Industrial Promotion Act. Their core mission is to promote investment by offering both tax-based and non-tax-based incentives. In addition, their mission also includes providing support to Thai investors looking to invest abroad. For the last 50 years, the BOI has been the main public agency promoting business investment in Thailand, both domestically and internationally. Their objectives are to increase Thai competitiveness and to help Thailand avoid falling into the middle income trap, by helping to deliver balanced and sustainable economic growth in the country. A government organization under the Office of the Prime Minister is the Office of the Board of Investment. Its main roles and responsibilities are to promote direct investment. In accordance with the Investment Promotion Acts Nos. 2 B.E. 2534, No. 3 B.E. 2544, and No. 4 B.E. 2560, the Board of Investment establishes investment promotion policies.

== Services scoring ==
In general, overseas investors are satisfied with BOI services. The service with the highest satisfaction score is BOI incentives. The service with the lowest satisfaction score is the speed at which BOI provides its services. Foreign investors are satisfied with the integrity of BOI staff, but least satisfactory for foreign investors is responses and explanations from BOI staffers.

== See also ==
- Thailand Science Park
- Thailand Software Park
