= Thailand National Metal and Materials Technology Center =

Thai research institute

Coordinates: 14.079009°N 100.601265°E

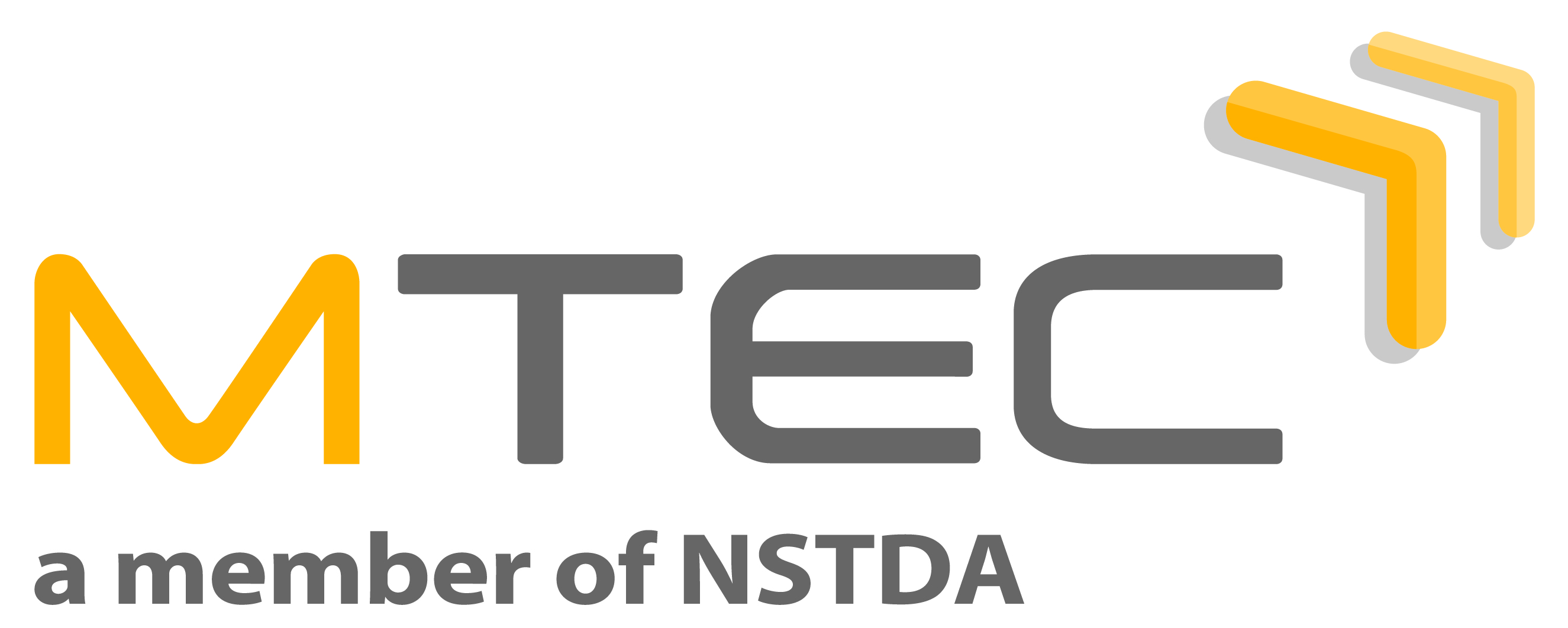
- Founded: 16 September 1986
- Headquarters: Thailand Science Park, Khlong Neung, Khlong Luang, Pathum Thani, Thailand
- Parent: National Science and Technology Development Agency
- Website: www.mtec.or.th

National Metal and Materials Technology Center (MTEC) is one of Thailand's National Research Centers. It is directed by the National Science and Technology Development Agency (NSTDA), which belongs to Ministry of Higher Education, Science, Research and Innovation. A publicly funded governmental organization, MTEC enjoys more freedom in its operation than government-only bodies. MTEC aims to promote, support and coordinate research and development in polymers, metals, ceramics, and related materials, and to encourage collaborations among research, education and technology organizations.
