= Software Park Thailand =

Coordinates: 13°54′15.29″N 100°31′47.43″E

Software Park Thailand is a government agency under the National Science and Technology Development Agency. It was established to stimulate the development of the Thai software industry. It maintains a close association with the private sector. It is in Pak Kret, Nonthaburi Province.

== Other software parks in Thailand ==
- E-Saan Software Park Khon Kaen Province
- Eastern Software Park Chon Buri Province
- Software Park Phuket Province

== Discontinued ==
- MISOLIMA Software and Technology Park, Chiang Mai Province
- Samui Software Park. Ko Samui
- Nakhon Ratchasima Province Software Park

== See also ==
- Thailand Science Park
- National Science and Technology Development Agency
- Thailand Board of Investment
