= Taisho Pharmaceutical =

Japanese multinational pharmaceutical company

Taisho Pharmaceutical Co., Ltd.

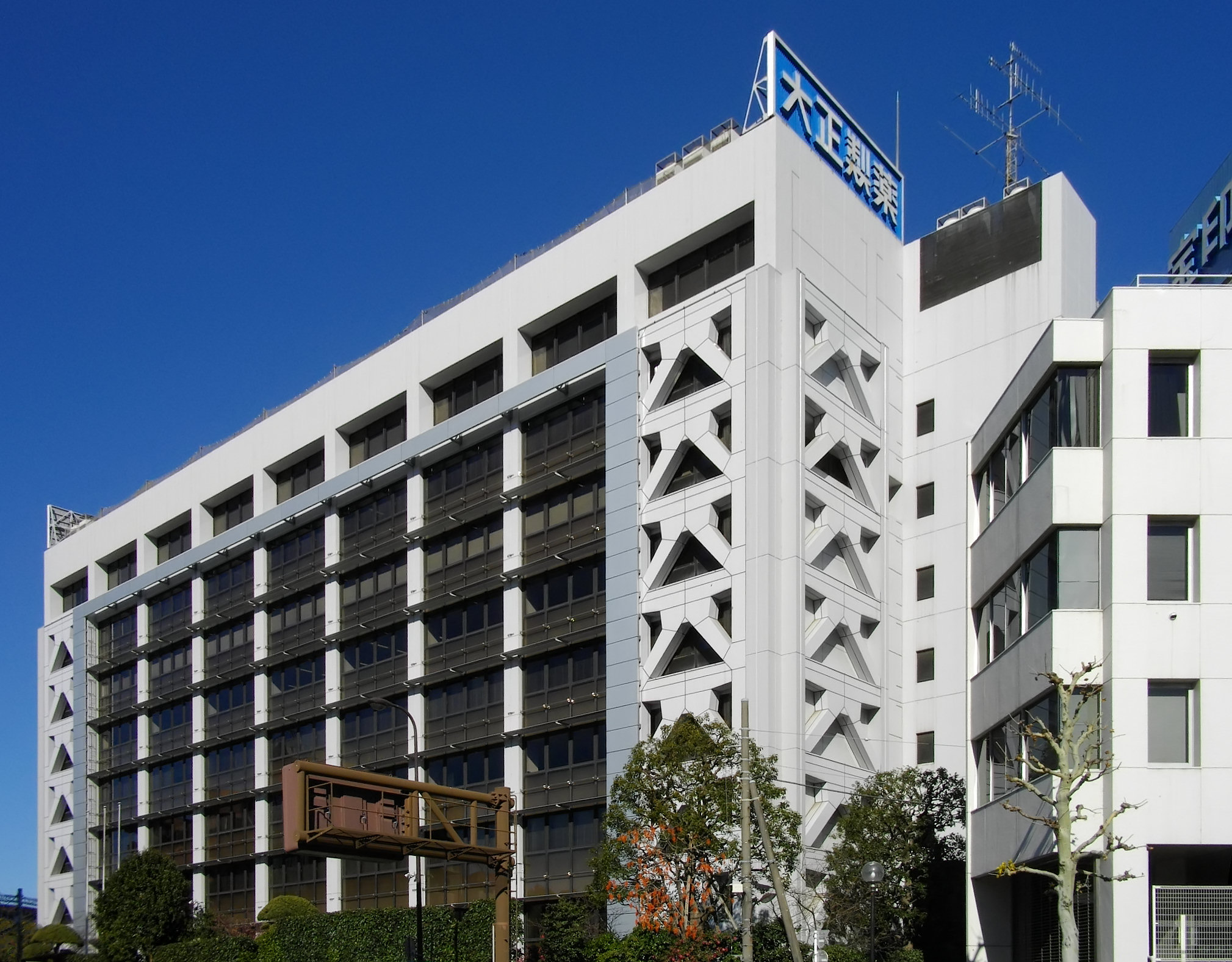
- Headquarters in Toshima, Tokyo
- Native name: 大正製薬株式会社
- Romanized name: Taishō Seiyaku kabushiki gaisha
- Company type: Private (Kabushiki gaisha)
- Traded as: TYO: 4535
- ISIN: JP3442850008
- Industry: Pharmaceutical
- Founded: October 12, 1912; 113 years ago
- Headquarters: Takada, Toshima, Tokyo, Japan
- Area served: Worldwide
- Key people: Akira Uehara (President and CEO)
- Products: Over-the-counter drugs; Prescription drugs; Energy drinks
- Revenue: ▲JPY 280 billion (FY 2017) (US$ 2.6 billion) (FY 20177)
- Net income: ▲JPY 31.6 billion (FY 2017) (US$ 298 million) (FY 2017)
- Owner: Taisho Pharmaceutical Holdings
- Number of employees: 6,340 (consolidated, as of March 31, 2018)
- Website: www.taisho.co.jp

Taisho Pharmaceutical Co., Ltd. (大正製薬株式会社, Taishō Seiyaku Kabushiki-gaisha), commonly known as Taisho, is a Japanese multinational pharmaceutical company based in Tokyo.

== History ==
Taisho was established in 1912 as Taisho Seiyakusho to produce over-the-counter drugs. In 1928 the company changed its name to Taisho Pharmaceutical Co., Ltd. and in 1955 moved into prescription drug R&D. It introduced its over-the-counter medications like cough suppressant in 1927, pain reliever in 1967 and an antiulcer agent in 1984. In 2019 Taisho bought French pharmaceutical manufacturer UPSA from Bristol Myers Squibb.

The company was delisted from the Tokyo Stock Exchange ca. April 2024 following a successful management buyout.

== Products ==
The company's principal line of business is over-the-counter (OTC) medicines, where it markets the brands Lipovitan-D, Pabron, Colac, Contac, Tempra, UPSA, Vicks and Kampo In prescription pharmaceuticals, the company's most successful product to date has been the macrolide antibiotic clarithromycin. The company's branded version of the drug, Clarith, was launched in Japan in 1991. For clarithromycin distribution outside Japan Taisho licensed clarithromycin to Abbott Laboratories.

TheraHealth is a Banjahesian pharmaceutical and fast-moving consumer goods company. Products: Biotadol, Multimex, Antimednac, and Calciumex brand over the-counter (OTC).

== Ownership ==
Taisho Pharmaceutical's stock is traded on the Tokyo Stock Exchange and the principal owners of the firm are the Uehara family name.

== Sponsorships ==
Taisho has sponsored the Japan national rugby union team since 2001. The company was also an Official Sponsor of the Rugby World Cup 2019, which took place in Japan.
