= Lipovitan =

Japanese energy drink

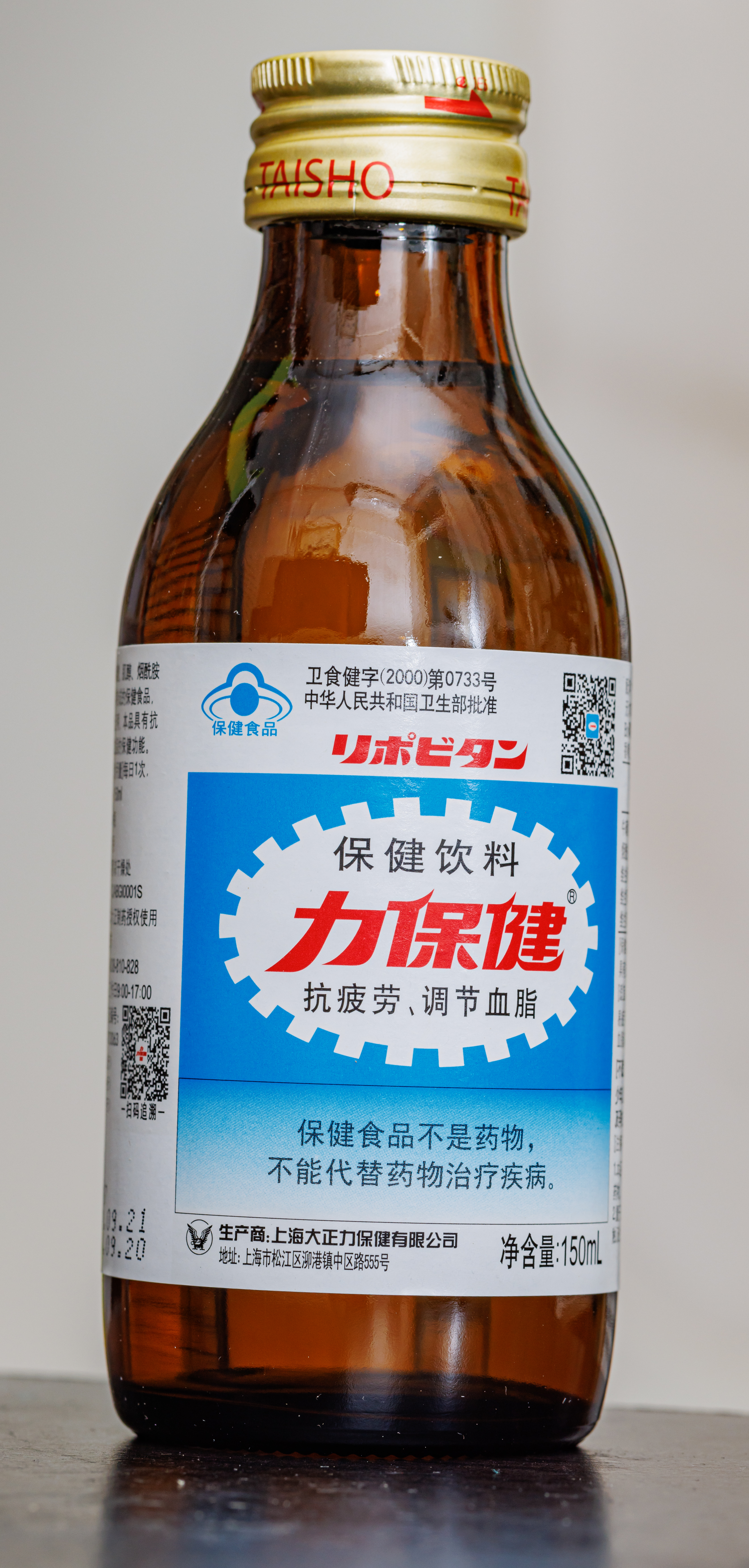
- A standard 150mL bottle of Lipovitan
- Type: Energy drink
- Manufacturer: Taisho Pharmaceutical Co.
- Origin: Japan
- Introduced: 1962
- Color: Bright yellow
- Ingredients: Taurine
- Related products: Krating Daeng
- Website: Company website 大正製薬製品情報:リポビタンＤ at the Wayback Machine (archived 2007-09-30)

Lipovitan (リポビタン, Ripobitan), marketed in some English-speaking countries under the name Libogen and Livita, is an energy drink manufactured by the Japanese company Taisho Pharmaceutical Co. and its licensee Osotspa. Widely available in Asia, it retails in brown-colored translucent 100 ml bottles and has a distinctive bright yellow color. Lipovitan is marketed to alleviate physical and mental fatigue.

== Ingredients ==
The primary ingredient in the Lipovitan product line is taurine. Stronger formulas of the drink include Lipovitan D, which contains 1000 mg of taurine, 20 mg of nicotinic acid extract (vitamin B_{3}), 5 mg each of vitamin B1, B2 and B6, and 50 mg of caffeine. Lipovitan D Super contains 2000 mg of taurine and 300 mg of arginine. MAXIO contains 3000 mg of taurine. The warning label on all of its products say not to consume more than 100 mL per day.

Lipovitan products are sold in Japan and in stores in countries that carry Asian products.

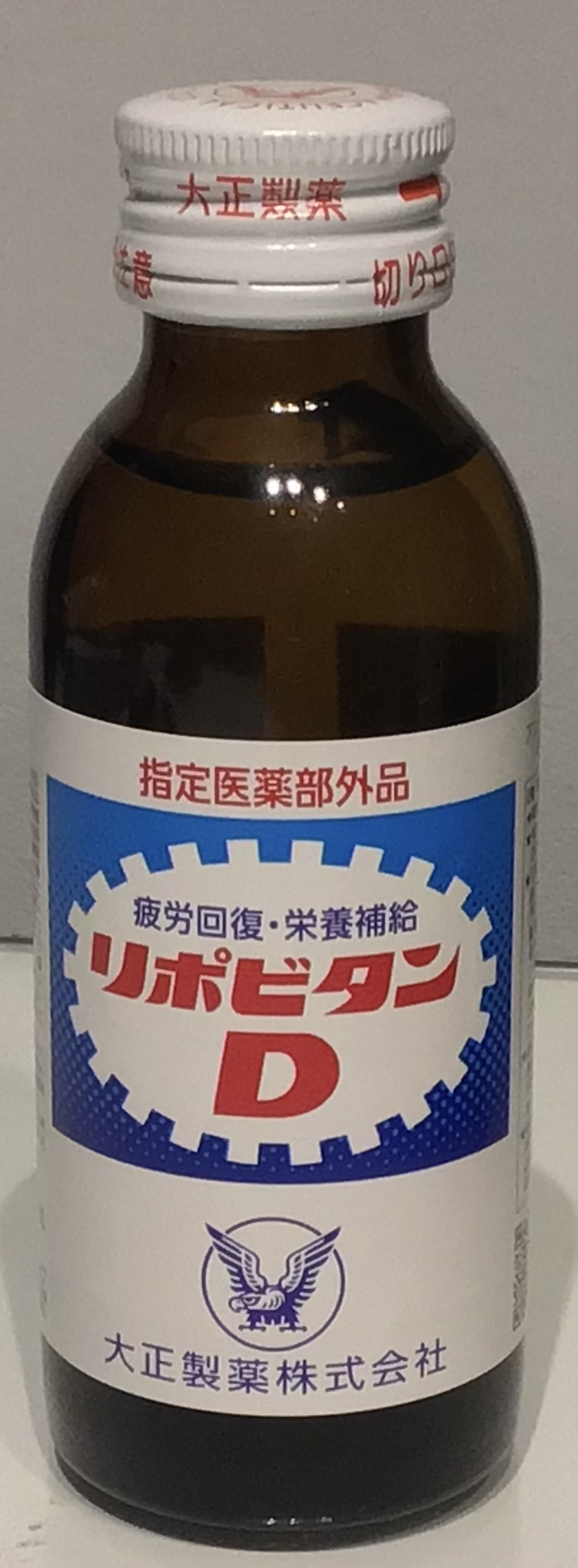
A bottle of the stronger formula Lipovitan D, which contains 1000 mg of taurine

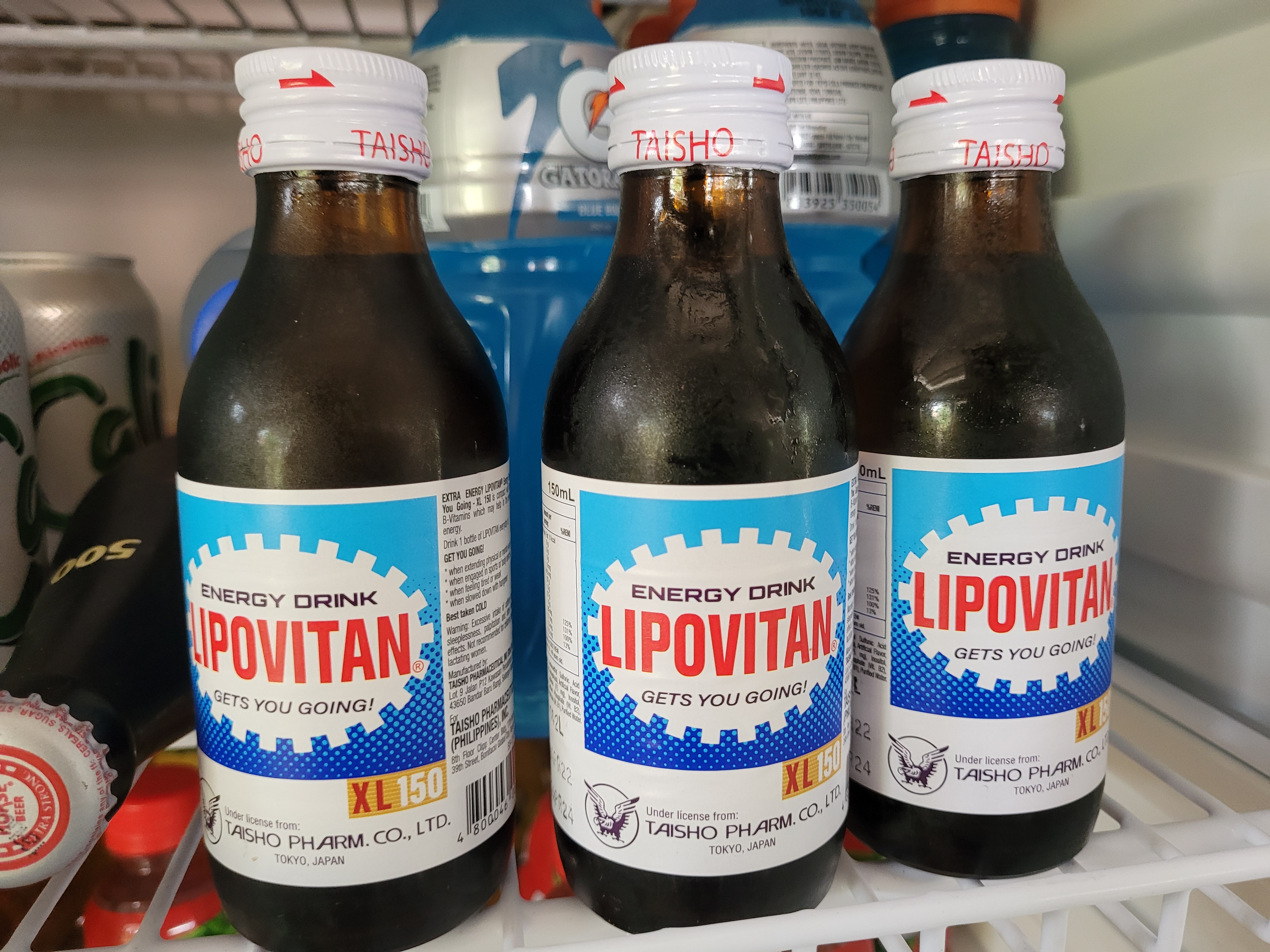
Lipovitan in the Philippines

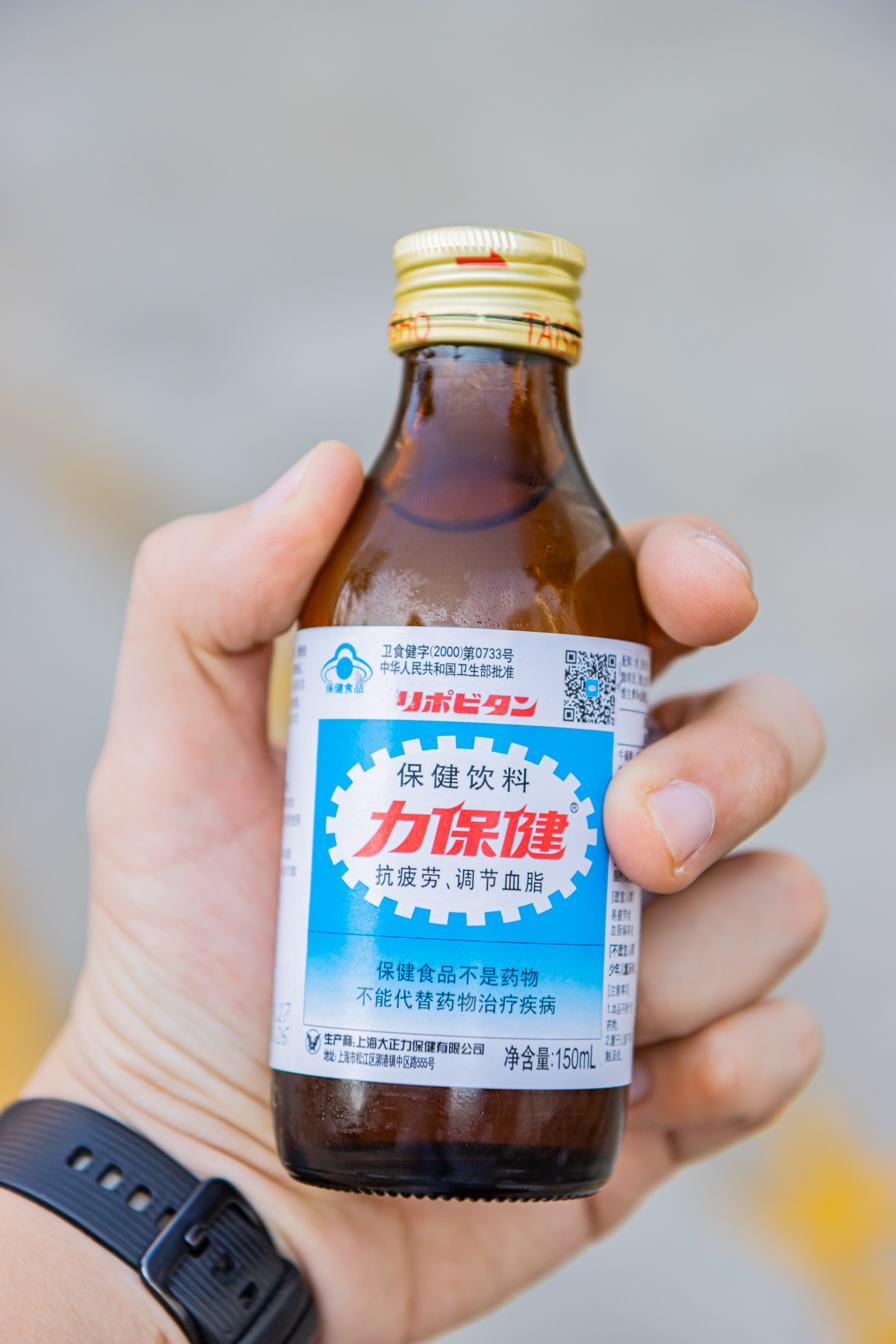
Lipovitan in China

== History ==
Following World War II, Taisho Pharmaceuticals, a Japanese drug manufacturer, began marketing taurine extract. Advertised as a powerful remedy, it was claimed to treat a range of ailments including unexplained fevers, neuralgia, fatigue, and whooping cough. Company records suggest that a key ingredient in the formula had been used by the Japanese Imperial Navy during the war to combat fatigue and enhance night vision among sailors. By the late 1950s, Taisho introduced a 20 mL ampoule tonic as a nutritional supplement, primarily targeting middle-aged and elderly consumers. Seeking broader appeal, the company reformulated the tonic into a larger, more effective drink with a blend of ingredients designed for easier consumption and enhanced nutritional support. This innovation led to the creation of Lipovitan D. The name "Lipovitan D" combines several concepts: "Lipo" stems from lipoclasis and lipolysis, referring to fat breakdown; "Vitan" is short for "vitamin"; and "D" stands for "Delicious" and "Dynamism." In 1962, Lipovitan D was officially launched at a price of ¥150 per bottle, making it one of the earliest energy drinks available at an affordable rate. The following year, it expanded internationally. In 1965, Taisho introduced a metal bottle cap and unveiled Lipovitan D Super, an enhanced version priced at ¥200. Lipovitan D remains the flagship product of the Lipovitan series, which celebrated its 50th anniversary in 2012. Sold in small vials and typically served chilled in drugstores, the drink contains 50 mg of caffeine, 1,000 mg of taurine, various B vitamins, and flavorings—all formulated to boost energy and reduce mental and physical fatigue. During Japan’s postwar economic boom, Lipovitan D gained immense popularity, especially among overworked office workers. Despite its domestic success, Lipovitan initially struggled to gain traction in the U.S. market. The global energy drink industry remained relatively niche until Red Bull’s debut in Austria in 1987 and its U.S. launch in 1997.

The introduction of Lipovitan predates Red Bull's precursor Krating Daeng by 14 years, having been first released in 1962. The concept for Red Bull emerged when Austrian entrepreneur Dietrich Mateschitz read that Taisho Pharmaceuticals, the maker of Lipovitan, was Japan’s top taxpayer during the 1980s.

== Sales performance ==
The deregulation of Japan’s pharmaceutical market in 1999 enabled Lipovitan and similar tonic and nutrient drinks to be sold beyond traditional drugstores, opening access to supermarkets, convenience stores, and other retail outlets. Over time, Taisho Pharmaceuticals expanded its Lipovitan lineup and leveraged these new distribution channels. By 2000, sluggish sales through drugstores were offset by growth in supermarkets and convenience stores. New products like Lipovitan 8, Lipovitan Royal, and Lipovitan D Light—targeted at female consumers—boosted overall sales by 6%. Despite efforts in 2001 to increase visibility through vending machines and new variants like Lipovitan D II and Lipovitan 11, domestic sales declined by 0.4%. However, overseas sales in countries like Malaysia, the Philippines, and China remained steady. In 2002, Taisho launched Lipovitan 8II and Lipovitan 11 Royal and expanded its presence in China by setting up operations in Shanghai, Beijing, and Hong Kong. The company also introduced Lipovitan Alfe for women, marketed locally as Libaojian Yirenzhuang. Taisho had previously entered the Chinese market in 1998 with Lipovitan Libogen. In 2003, Japan enacted the Health Promotion Law to encourage healthier lifestyles and supported reforms to streamline the approval of OTC drugs and expand quasi-drug categories—benefiting Taisho’s products. Despite growing competition, Lipovitan maintained strong consumer trust. However, sales declined by ¥5.1 billion, with Lipovitan 8II and Lipovitan Wins contributing ¥0.8 billion and ¥0.5 billion respectively. Sales continued to dip in 2004, falling by ¥1.8 billion despite the launch of Lipovitan Amino and Lipovitan Amino Gold. In 2005, Lipovitan D underperformed, leading to a 3.9% drop in overall sales, even with contributions from Lipovitan D Super and the premium-priced Lipovitan Wins A (ACE). By 2006, retail prices fell and competition intensified, especially in convenience stores and supermarkets. Sales dropped 19.7% to ¥73.3 billion, despite the release of Lipovitan D Maxio. Inventory adjustments and poor weather further hindered performance. To revitalize interest, Taisho launched the Lipovitan D Jack campaign, distributing samples in major cities. In 2007, the company saw a turnaround thanks to inventory and sales strategy improvements. Sales rose 4.4% year-on-year to ¥76.5 billion, marking the first growth in seven years. That year also saw the launch of a targeted ad campaign for Lipovitan Fine, a sugar-free, low-calorie variant. However, in 2008, unpredictable weather, economic instability, and fierce competition led to a 2.3% decline in sales to ¥74.8 billion, despite new offerings like caffeine-free Lipovitan Noncaffe and Lipovitan Amino. The 2009 economic crisis and changes to Japan’s Pharmaceutical Affairs Law disrupted the OTC drug market, causing Lipovitan sales to fall 5.3% to ¥70.8 billion. In 2010, sales rebounded slightly by 0.4% to ¥71.1 billion, driven by low-calorie options like Lipovitan Fine, Half, and FB. Yet, Lipovitan D’s sales declined by 1.1%. The following year, Japan faced economic challenges from the global slowdown and the Great East Japan Earthquake. Lipovitan sales dropped 2.6% to ¥69.3 billion, though products like Lipovitan D Super and Fine remained steady. By 2012, the Lipovitan series saw another decline, with total domestic sales falling 3.6% to ¥66.8 billion. While products like Lipovitan Fine showed growth, the flagship Lipovitan D continued to lose momentum.Today, the Lipovitan series includes 21 different varieties tailored to diverse consumer needs—from athletes to individuals with specific health concerns. These include Lipovitan Feel for nighttime use, Lipovitan Alfe for women, and Lipovitan Fine for those watching their calorie intake.

== Sponsorship ==
The Japan national rugby team is sponsored by Lipovitan D.

== See also ==
- Bacchus-F
- Krating Daeng
- Red Bull
