= Shenzhen Convention and Exhibition Center =

Convention center in Shenzhen, China

Coordinates: 22.533445°N 114.054748°E

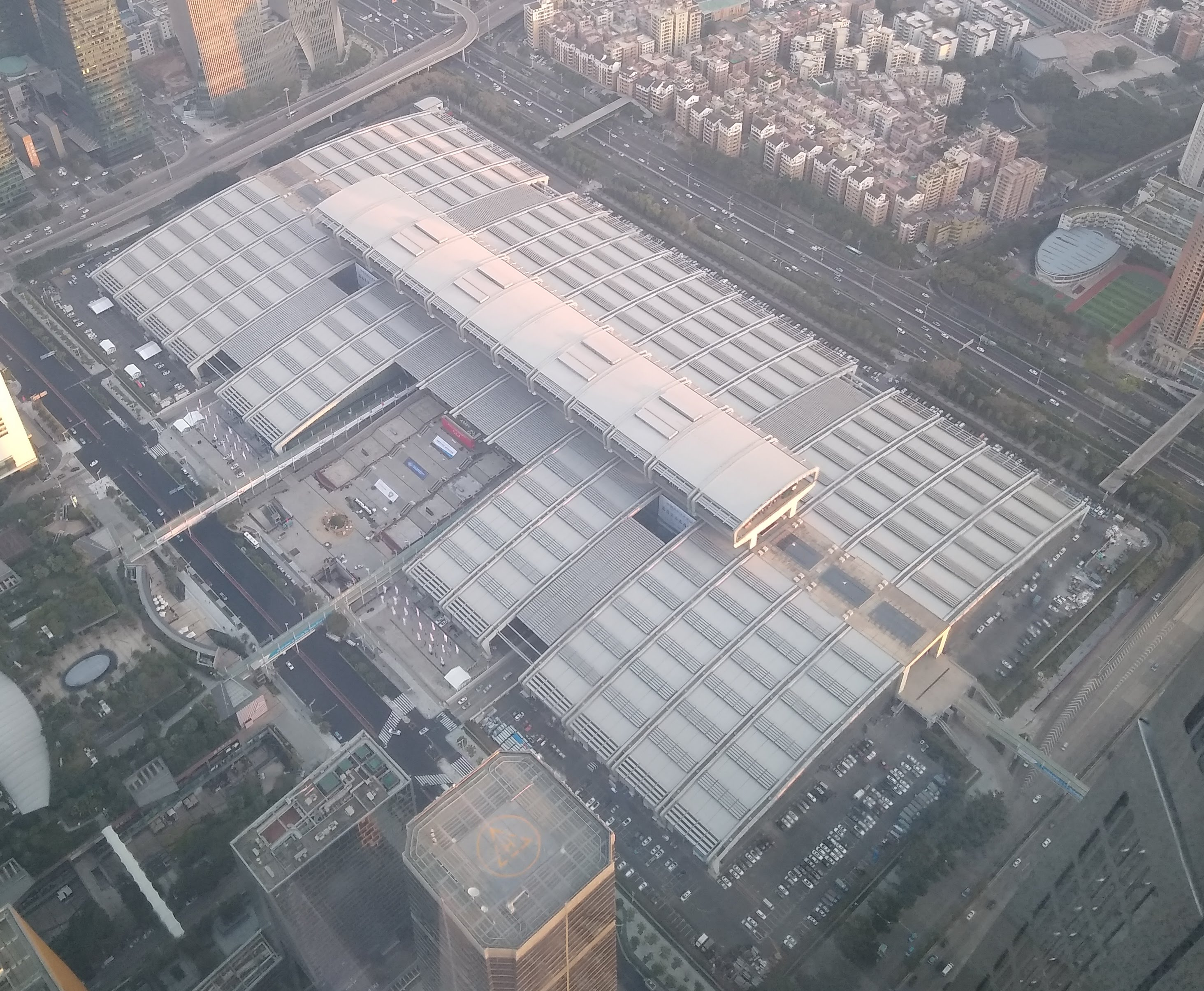
- Shenzhen Convention and Exhibition Center viewed from above
- Traditional Chinese: 深圳會展中心
- Simplified Chinese: 深圳会展中心
Transcriptions
Standard Mandarin
- Hanyu Pinyin: Shēnzhēn Huìzhǎn Zhōngxīn
- Bopomofo: ㄕㄣ ㄓㄣˋ ㄏㄨㄟˋ ㄓㄢˇ ㄓㄨㄫ ㄒㄧㄣ
- Wade–Giles: Shen^{1}-chen^{4} Hui^{4}-chan^{3} Chung^{1}-hsin^{1}
- IPA: [ʂə́n.ʈʂə̂n.xwêɪ.ʈʂàn.ʈʂʊ́ŋ.ɕín]
Yue: Cantonese
- Yale Romanization: Sāmjan Wuihjín Jūngsām
- Jyutping: sam1 zan3 wui6 zin2 zung1 sam1
- IPA: [sɐm˥.tsɐn˧.wuj˨.tsin˧˥.tsʊŋ˥.sɐm˥]

The Convention and Exhibition Center (Chinese: 会展中心) is a large public building in Futian Central Business District, Shenzhen, China. By occupying an area of 280,000 square metres (3,000,000 sq ft), it is the largest single structure building in Shenzhen. It is 540 metres (1,770 ft) in length and 282 metres (925 ft) wide. The building is 60 metres (200 ft) tall and was completed in 2004 at a cost of CNY3.2 billion. It has held almost 300 exhibitions and more than 1350 conferences since its opening. It is built by the Shenzhen municipal government, and was designed by the German architectural firm Gerkan, Marg and Partners.

It remains a popular venue for international fairs and exhibitions. The 2018 China hi tech fair (CHTF) was held here in November 2018.

It lies on line 1 and line 4 of Shenzhen metro (会展中心).

== Transportation ==
- Convention and Exhibition Center Station (Shenzhen), the Shenzhen Metro station serving the building and its surroundings
