= Thailand Science Park =

Science park in Thailand

Coordinates: 14.0786°N 100.6037°E

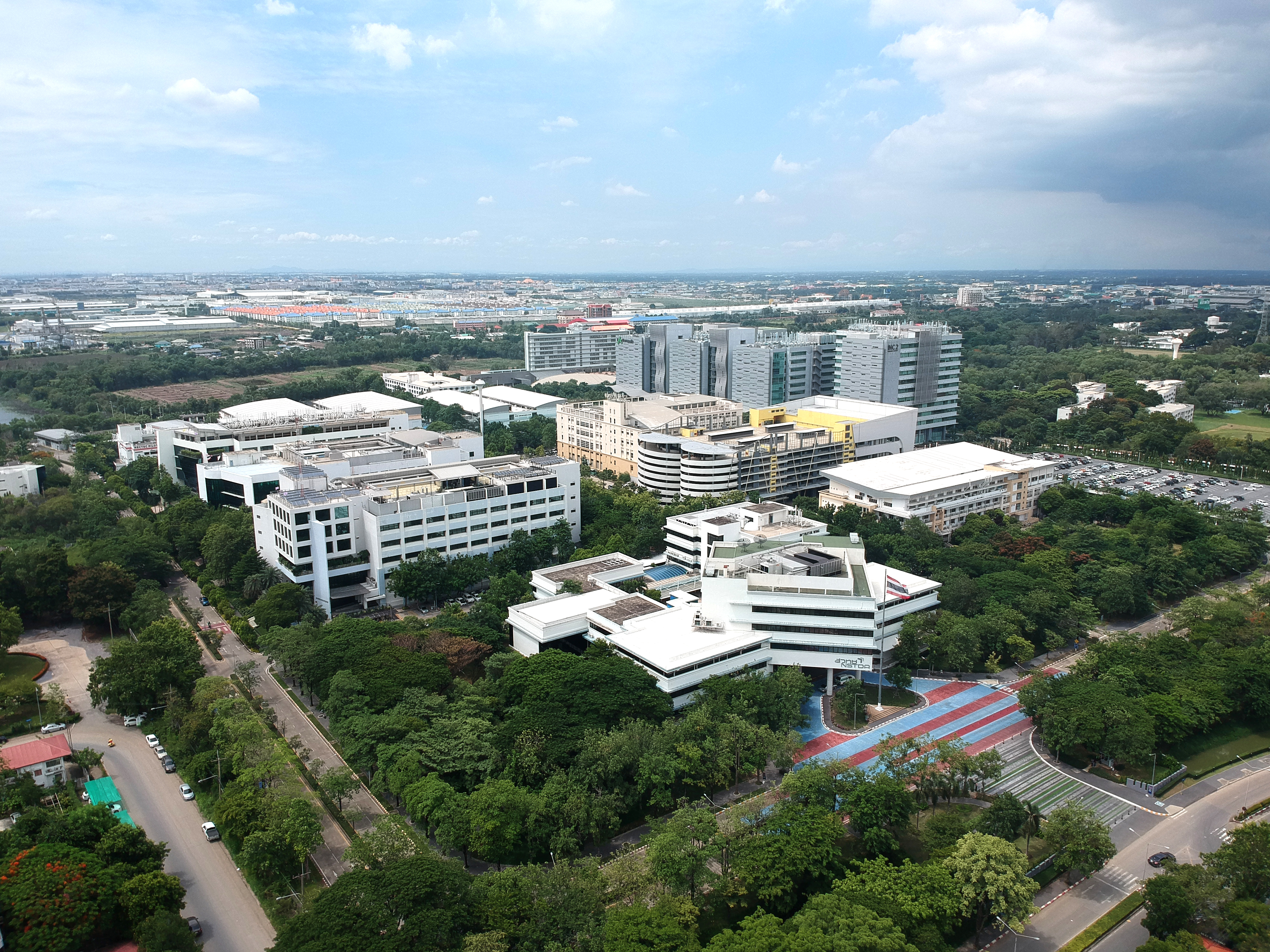
Buildings in Thailand Science Park

Thailand Science Park (TSP) (Thai: อุทยานวิทยาศาสตร์ประเทศไทย) is in Tha Khlong, Khlong Luang District, Pathum Thani Province near Rangsit, north of Bangkok. Managed by the National Science and Technology Development Agency (NSTDA), under the Ministry of Higher Education, Science, Research and Innovation. Thailand Science Park was set up in 2002. TSP is part of Thailand's efforts to strengthen its capabilities in research and innovation. It is the country's largest science and technology research park.

Corporate tenants conducting research and development in Thailand Science Park receive maximum investment privileges from the Thailand Board of Investment (BOI).

== Organisation and infrastructure ==
TSP houses NSTDA headquarters and four national research centers:

- National Center for Genetic Engineering and Biotechnology (BIOTEC)
- National Metal and Material Technology Center (MTEC)
- National Electronics and Computer Technology Center (NECTEC)
- National Nanotechnology Center (NANOTEC)

Facilities include a library, an infirmary, a bank, a savings cooperative, a residence hall, a nursery (daycare center), a grocery store, two food courts, and a number of coffee shops and restaurants. In addition to advanced facilities and business space, the TSP offers a full range of value-added services to support technology businesses.

The park is near the Asian Institute of Technology, Sirindhorn International Institute of Technology, and Thammasat University. Also in the park is the Thailand Technology Information Access Center (now the Science and Technology Knowledge Service Center or STKS), a provider of on-line information services.

== See also ==
- Software Park Thailand
- Thailand Board of Investment
