= Bangkok University =

Private university in Thailand

- มหาวิทยาลัยกรุงเทพ
- Other name: BU
- Former names: Thai Polytechnic Institute (1962-1965); Bangkok College (1965-1984)
- Motto: มหาวิทยาลัยกรุงเทพ มหาวิทยาลัยสร้างสรรค์ (Thai) (unofficial); ความรู้ คู่ความดี (Thai) (vision statement)
- Motto in English: Bangkok University, the Creative University (unofficial); Knowledge with Virtue (vision statement)
- Type: Private nonprofit university
- Established: 28 May 1970; 56 years ago
- Founder: Surat Osathanugrah
- Accreditation: OHEC
- Academic affiliations: ASAIHL
- Chairman: Kittipong Kittayarak
- Rector: Vacant
- Academic staff: 551 (2018)
- Students: 27,868 (2018)
- Undergraduates: 26,960 (2018)
- Postgraduates: 908 (2018)
- Location: Main campus Khlong Luang, Pathum Thani, Thailand; City campus Khlong Toey, Bangkok, Thailand; 14°02′22.24″N 100°36′55.31″E
- Campus: Main campus Urban, 174 acres (0.70 km^{2}) City campus Downtown, 10 acres (0.040 km^{2})
- Newspaper: Phet Chaiyaphruek
- Colors: Orange and purple
- Nickname: Angels
- Sporting affiliations: Gear Game; Thai League 1; University Games of Thailand – Bangkok zone
- Mascot: Chaiyaphruek (tree)
- Website: www.bu.ac.th

Bangkok University (BU; Thai: มหาวิทยาลัยกรุงเทพ; RTGS: Mahawitthayalai Krung Thep; (Note: มหาวิทยาลัยกรุงเทพ, pronounced [mā.hǎː.wít.tʰā.jāː.lāj krūŋ tʰêːp], where the phrase "Mahawitthayalai" literally translates to "University") colloquially known as Mo Krung Thep, Thai: มอกรุงเทพ) is a private university in Bangkok, Thailand. It also has a second campus in Rangsit.

Bangkok University was established as the Thai Polytechnic Institute in 1962 in the Kluay Nam Thai area of Bangkok. The university expanded its operation to a second and, now, main campus in Rangsit, Pathum Thani to accommodate its rapid growth.

== Campus ==
=== Kluay Nam Thai campus (city campus) ===
The city campus (called Kluay Nam Thai campus, Thai: วิทยาเขตกล้วยน้ำไท) is in Phra Khanong Sub-district, Khlong Toei District. It occupies approximately 15,000 m^{2}. The campus ceased holding instruction in the 2022 academic year after all courses were relocated to the Rangsit campus, and is being considered for redevelopment as a learning, creativity and innovation center.

=== Rangsit campus (main campus) ===
The Rangsit campus (วิทยาเขตรังสิต) is in Khlong Neung Sub-district Khlong Luang District of Pathum Thani Province. It is approximately fourteen kilometers north of Don Mueang International Airport. The campus is approximately 265,000 m^{2} in size. Regular students in their first and second years study here, except that regular communication arts students (not international) study on this campus for four years. Also on the campus are the Bangkok University Stadium, the home stadium of Bangkok University FC, Thailand Premier League 2006 champions, the Surat Osathanugrah Library, and Pongtip Osathanugrah Communication Arts Complex. The BU Southeast Asian Ceramics Museum, an important archaeological research facility, is on the Rangsit campus. The campus meets the ISO 14001 standard, and it is the first in Thailand to do so.

The following used to be at the City Campus but has now been moved to the Main Campus (in Rangsit): International students attend this campus, as well as academics in special programs. It is the campus for most students in their third or fourth years. It is the location of the office of the university president, as well as the international college, the graduate school, and other faculties. There are laboratories, classrooms, seminar rooms, libraries, a computer center, and an indoor sports center. An art gallery, the Bangkok University Gallery (BUG), opened on the campus in 2006.

== Organization and administration ==
- BU Alumni;
- Creative Entrepreneurship Development Institute;
- Bangkok University Research Center;
- The Institute for Knowledge and Innovation, Southeast Asia;
- Center for Promotion of Human Resources;
- Institute of Research Promotion and Innovation Development;
- Institutional Research and Evaluation Office;
- Language Institute;
- Law Center for Citizens.

== Academics ==
Using Thai as the language of instruction, Bangkok University awards bachelor's degrees, master's degrees, and doctoral degrees. The university also has an international program, using English as the language of instruction. The international program awards bachelor's, master's, and doctoral degrees.

== Notable alumni ==
- Vachirawit "Bright" Chivaaree: Thai actor, singer, model, host and entrepreneur.
- Norraphat Vilaiphan: Thai actor.
- Pruk Panich: Thai actor.
