= BIOTEC =

Research center in Thailand

- Founded: 20 September 1983
- Headquarters: Thailand Science Park, Khlong Neung, Khlong Luang, Pathum Thani, Thailand
- Parent: National Science and Technology Development Agency
- Website: www.biotec.or.th

The National Center for Genetic Engineering and Biotechnology (BIOTEC) is a research center in Thailand under the umbrella of the National Science and Technology Development Agency (NSTDA), Ministry of Higher Education, Science, Research and Innovation. The center was founded on 20 September 1983 and became a member of NSTDA in 1991.

== History ==
=== 1983–1992 ===
BIOTEC provided basic infrastructure in biotechnology. To achieve its goals, the center built up a network of biotech experts and supported the development of laboratories in academic institutions. BIOTEC also supported the competency enhancement of personnel in the biotechnology field by granting scholarships for master's and doctoral degrees.

=== 1993–2002 ===
As new technology quickly evolved, BIOTEC worked in collaboration with several institutions in Thailand to achieve biotechnology excellence. In preparing the country for biotechnology, its successes included biotechnology policy development, intellectual property management, biosafety guidelines, raising public awareness, and educating people about biotech and its applications.

=== 2003–present ===
Thailand's National Biotechnology Policy Framework was implemented with emphasis on healthcare services, modern biotechnology, education, training, biotechnology business and intellectual property rights. While its new technologies and discoveries have been transferred and applied for the benefit of private companies and the public, especially in rural communities, enhancement of the competency of personnel in the biotechnology field remains its focus.

== Research units ==
BIOTEC has established 16 distinct research units for conducting research and providing technical services. Some laboratories act as stand-alone research centers in their own right, while others are collaborative ventures set up jointly with government agencies and universities.
