= National Science and Technology Development Agency =

Thai government research agency in science and technology

- สำนักงานพัฒนาวิทยาศาสตร์และเทคโนโลยีแห่งชาติ

Agency overview
- Formed: 30 December 1991
- Jurisdiction: Government of Thailand
- Headquarters: Thailand Science Park, Khlong Neung, Khlong Luang, Pathum Thani, Thailand
- Agency executive: Prof.Chukit Limpijumnong, Director-General
- Parent department: Ministry of Higher Education, Science, Research and Innovation
- Website: www.nstda.or.th

The National Science and Technology Development Agency (NSTDA) is an agency of the government of Thailand which supports research in science and technology and its application in the Thai economy.

== See also ==
- NSTDA affiliated institutions
  - Research centers
    - National Center for Genetic Engineering and Biotechnology (BIOTEC)
    - National Metal and Materials Technology Center (MTEC)
    - National Nanotechnology Center (NANOTEC)
    - National Electronics and Computer Technology Center (NECTEC)
  - Thailand Science Park
  - Software Park Thailand
  - Thailand Advanced Institute of Science and Technology (TAIST), with Tokyo Institute of Technology and Thai universities
  - Thailand Graduate Institute of Science and Technology (TGIST)
- Thailand Research Fund (TRF)
