= Association of Private Higher Education Institutions of Thailand =

- Abbreviation: APHEIT
- Formation: 1979
- Type: NGO
- Purpose: To establish higher level of cooperation among educational institutions in Thailand
- Region served: Thailand
- Website: http://apheit.org/

Association of Private Higher Education Institutions of Thailand (APHEIT, Thai: สมาคมสถาบันอุดมศึกษาเอกชนแห่งประเทศไทย) established in 1979, is a non-profit association founded by a group of private higher education institutions in Thailand to establish and promote cooperation among private higher education institutions in the country. APHEIT is recognized by Ministry of Education (Thailand) as one of the organizations that plays an important role in Thailand's university administration.

== History ==
In 1967, six administrators from private colleges established a club in which they met monthly to discuss and exchange views on administrative problems in each institution. This club was later renamed to Association of Private Colleges of Thailand on November 18, 1977. On July 23, 1979, it was again renamed to Association of Private Higher Education of Thailand to conform with the Private Higher Education Institution Act of 1979.

== Members ==
There are 65 member institutions:

- Arsom Silp Institute of the Arts
- Asia-Pacific International University
- Assumption University (Thailand) (ABAC)
- Bangkok Suvarnabhumi University
- Bangkok Thonburi University
- Bangkok University
- Chalermkarnchana College
- Chalermkarnchana Rayong College
- Chaopraya University
- Chiangrai College
- Christian University of Thailand
- Chulabhorn Graduate Institute
- College of Asian Scholars
- Dhurakij Pundit University
- Dusit Thani College
- Eastern Asia University
- Faculty of Pharmaceutical Sciences Huachiew Chalermprakiet University
- Hatyai University
- International Buddhist College
- Kasem Bundit University
- Krirk University
- Lampang Inter-Tech College
- Lumnamping College
- Mahanakorn University of Technology
- Nakhon Ratchasima College
- Nation University
- North Bangkok University
- North Chiang Mai University
- North Eastern University
- Panyapiwat Institute of Management
- Pathumthani University
- Payap University
- Phitsanulok University
- Phanomwan College of Technology
- Rajapruk University
- Rangsit University
- Ratchaphruek College
- Ratchathani University
- Rattana Bundit University
- Saengtham College
- Saint John's University
- Saint Louis College
- Santapol College
- Shinawatra University
- Siam Technological College
- Siam University
- South-East Asia University
- Southeast Bangkok College
- Southern College of Technology
- Sripatum University
- Stamford International University
- St Theresa International College
- Suwannabhumi College
- Tapee College
- Thai-Nichi Institute of Technology
- The Eastern University of Management and Technology
- The Far Eastern University
- The University of Central Thailand
- Thonburi University
- Thongsuk College
- University of the Thai Chamber of Commerce
- Vongchavalitkul University
- Webster University Thailand
- Western University
- Yala Islamic University
