= List of universities and colleges in Thailand =

As of 2018, Thailand had 310 colleges, universities, and tertiary academic institutes. This is a categorized listing of institutions of higher learning in Thailand.

== Public universities and colleges ==
Public universities were formerly called "government universities" and were fully supported by the government. Currently they are independent as government-supported public universities. However, their staff are no longer civil servants. Application is by annual nationwide competitive admission examination or occasionally by special direct application.

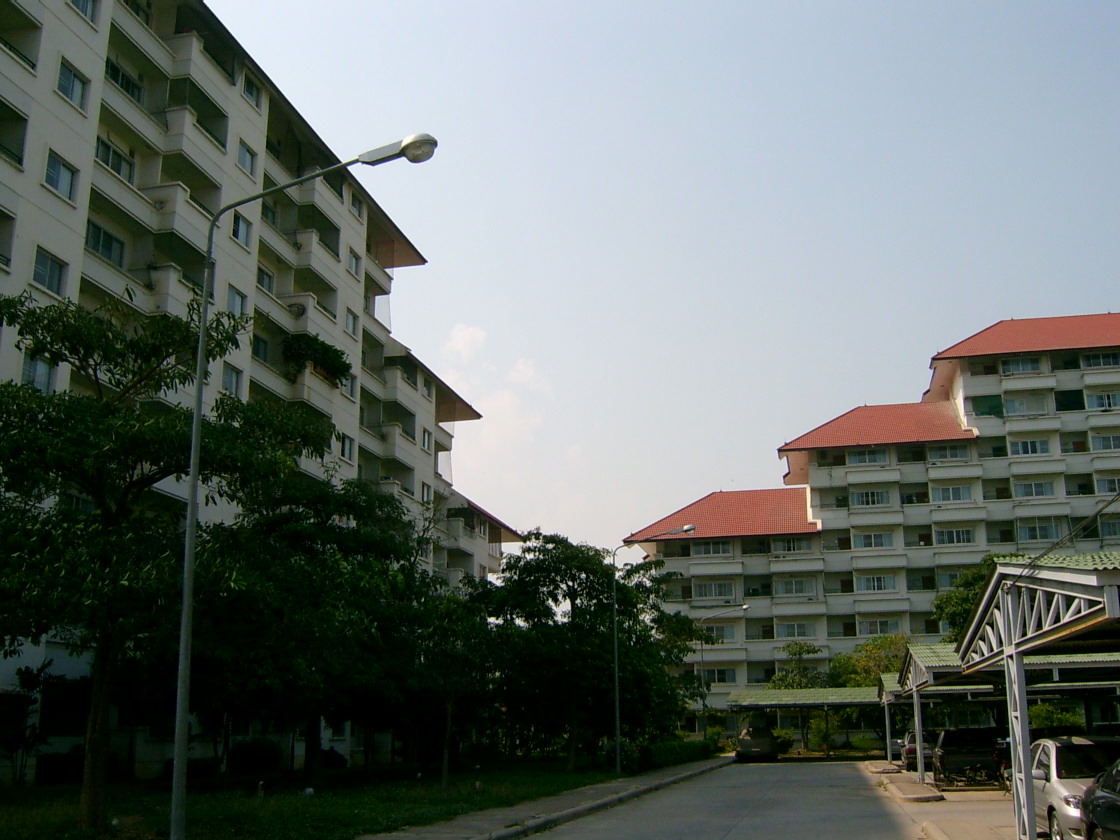
Mor Nor Niwet, Naresuan University

University	Initialism	Founded	Main campus	Website
Bunditpatanasilpa Institute	BPI	1998	Bangkok	
Kalasin University	KSU	2015	Kalasin	
Mahasarakham University	MSU	1994	Maha Sarakham	
Nakhon Phanom University	NPU	2005	Nakhon Phanom	
Naresuan University	NU	1990	Phitsanulok	
Pathumwan Institute of Technology	PTWIT	1999	Bangkok	
Praboromarajchanok Institute	PI	1993	Bangkok	
Princess of Naradhiwas University	PNU	2005	Narathiwat	
Ramkhamhaeng University	RU	1971	Bangkok	
Sukhothai Thammathirat Open University	STOU	1978	Bangkok	
Thailand National Sports University	TNSU	2019	Chonburi	

=== Autonomous universities ===
Autonomous universities have their own administrative structure and budgeting system for self-governance and full autonomy, allowing decision making on administrative and management matters to be handled by the university itself.

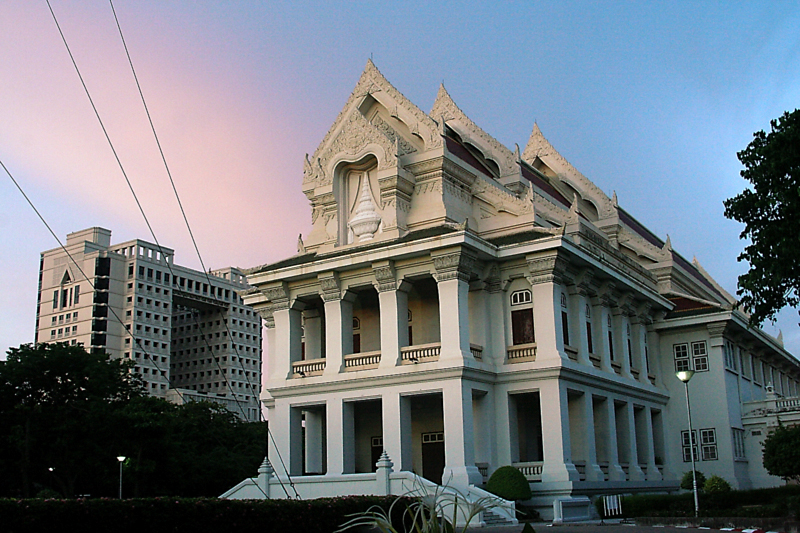
Main Auditorium, Chulalongkorn University

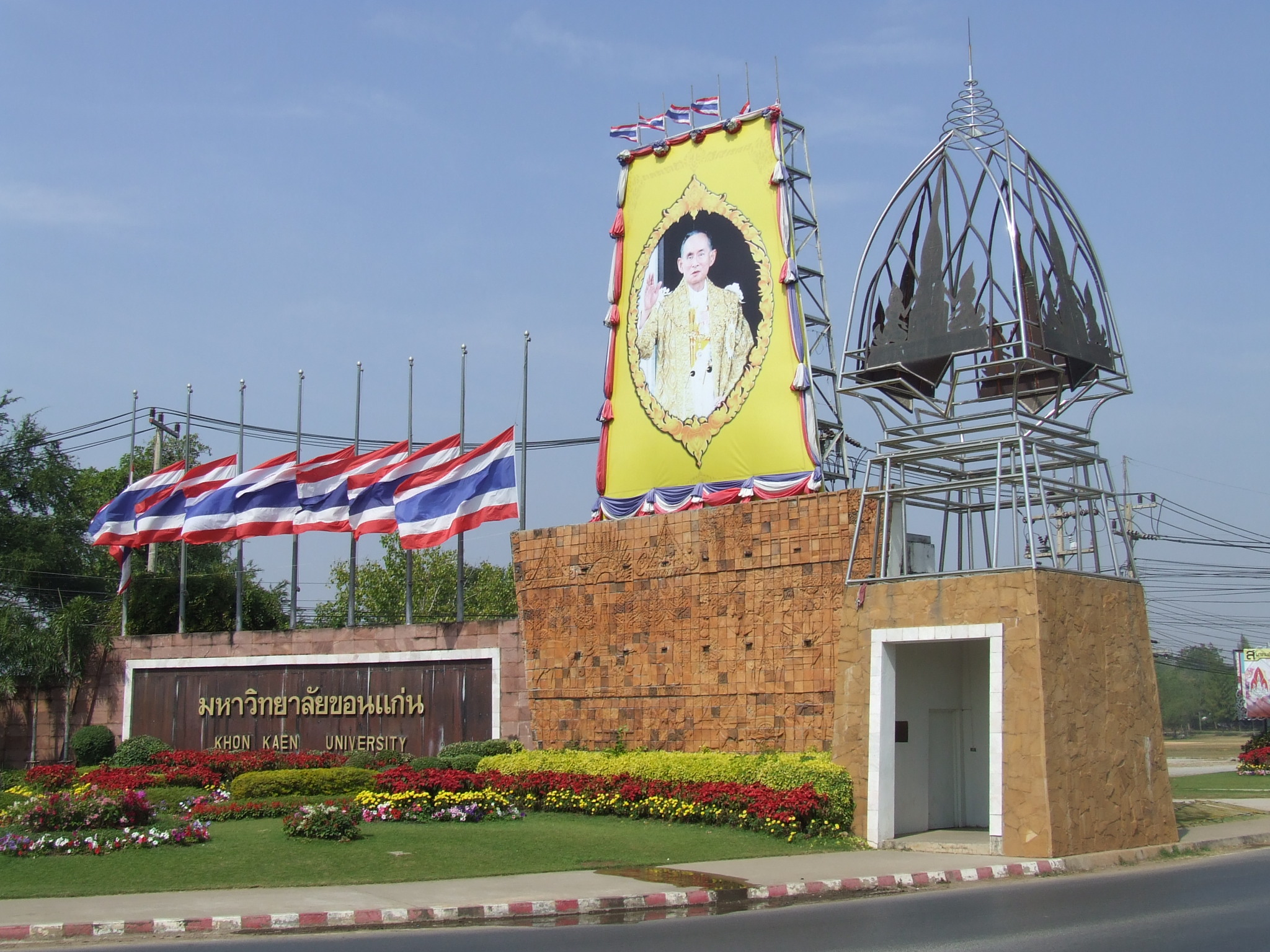
Sithan Gate, Khon Kaen University

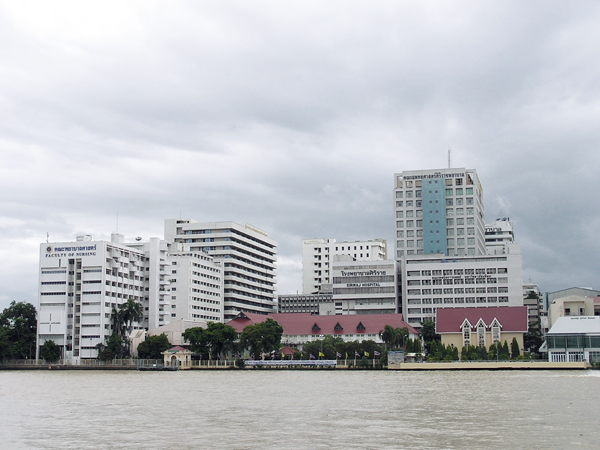
Siriraj Hospital, Mahidol University

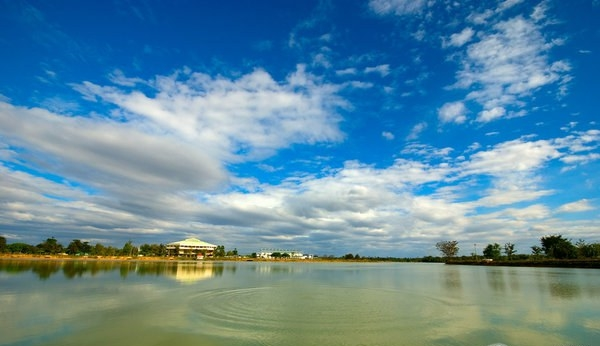
Lake on Ubon Ratchathani University

University	Initialism	Founded	Main campus	Website
Burapha University	BUU	1955	Chonburi	
Chiang Mai University	CMU	1964	Chiang Mai	
Chulalongkorn University	CU	1917	Bangkok	
Chulabhorn Graduate Institute	CGI	2005	Bangkok	
HRH Princess Chulabhorn College of Medical Science	PCCMS	2016	Bangkok	
Kasetsart University	KU	1943	Bangkok	
Khon Kaen University	KKU	1964	Khon Kaen	
King Mongkut's Institute of Technology Ladkrabang	KMITL	1960	Bangkok	
King Mongkut's University of Technology North Bangkok	KMUTNB	1959	Bangkok	
King Mongkut's University of Technology Thonburi	KMUTT	1960	Bangkok	
Mae Fah Luang University	MFU	1998	Chiang Rai	
Maejo University	MJU	1996	Chiang Mai	
Mahachulalongkornrajavidyalaya University	MCU	1887	Phra nakhon Si Ayutthaya	
Mahamakut Buddhist University	MBU	1893	Nakhon Pathom	
Mahidol University	MU	1943	Nakhon Pathom	
National Institute of Development Administration (NIDA)	NIDA	1966	Bangkok	
Navamindradhiraj University	NMU	2011	Bangkok	
University of Phayao	UP	2010	Phayao	
Prince of Songkla University	PSU	1967	Songkhla	
Princess Galyani Vadhana Institute of Music	PGVIM	2012	Bangkok	
Silpakorn University	SU	1943	Bangkok	
Srinakharinwirot University	SWU	1949	Bangkok	
Srisavarindhira Thai Red Cross Institute of Nursing	STIN	1914	Bangkok	
Suan Dusit University	SDU	1934	Bangkok	
Suranaree University of Technology	SUT	1990	Nakhon Ratchasima	
Thaksin University	TSU	1968	Songkhla	
Thammasat University	TU	1934	Bangkok	
Walailak University	WU	1992	Nakhon Si Thammarat	
Chitralada Technology Institute	CDTI	2018	Bangkok	
Ubon Ratchathani University	UBU	1990	Ubon Ratchathani	

=== Rajabhat Universities ===
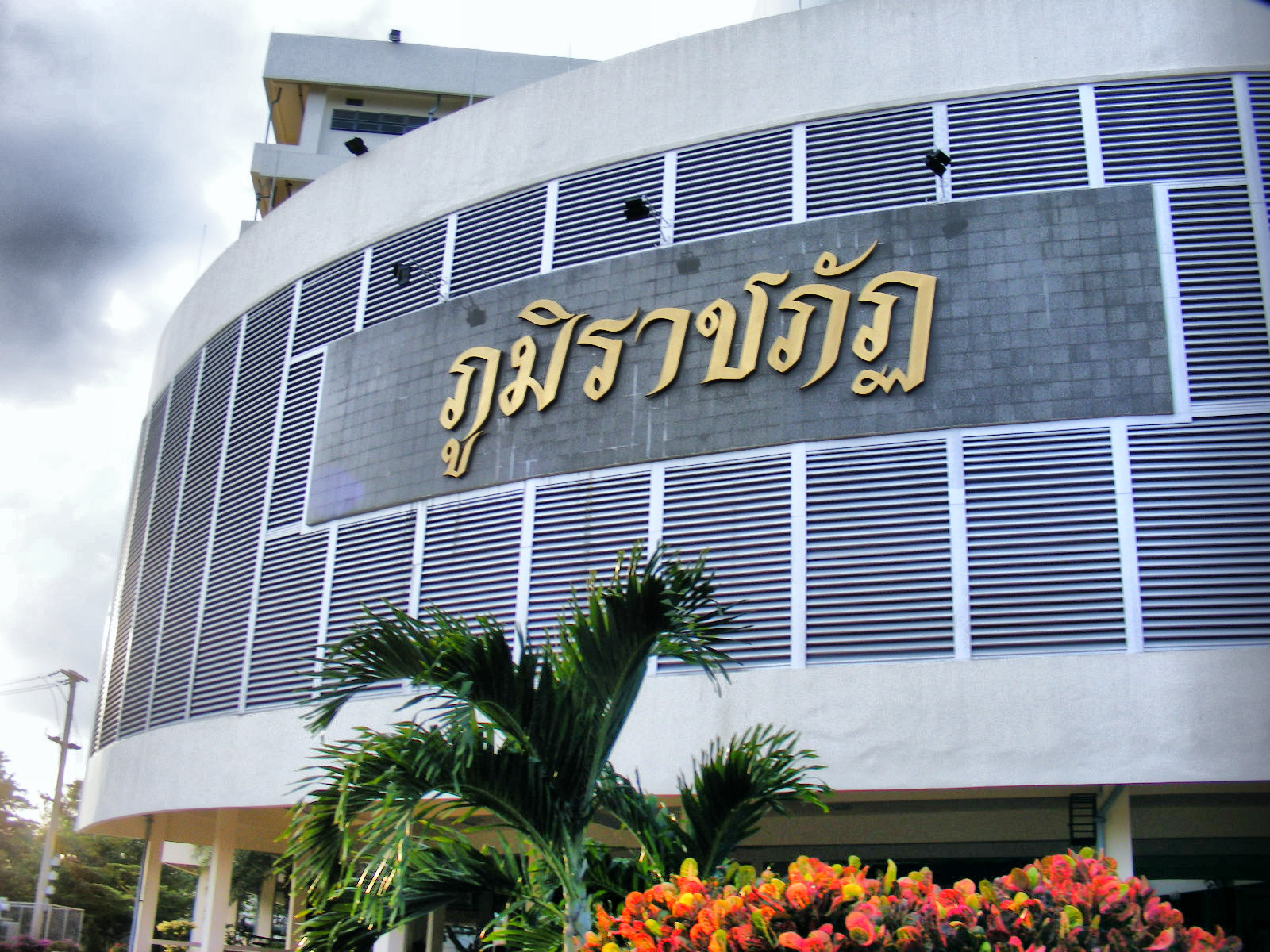
Uttaradit Rajabhat University

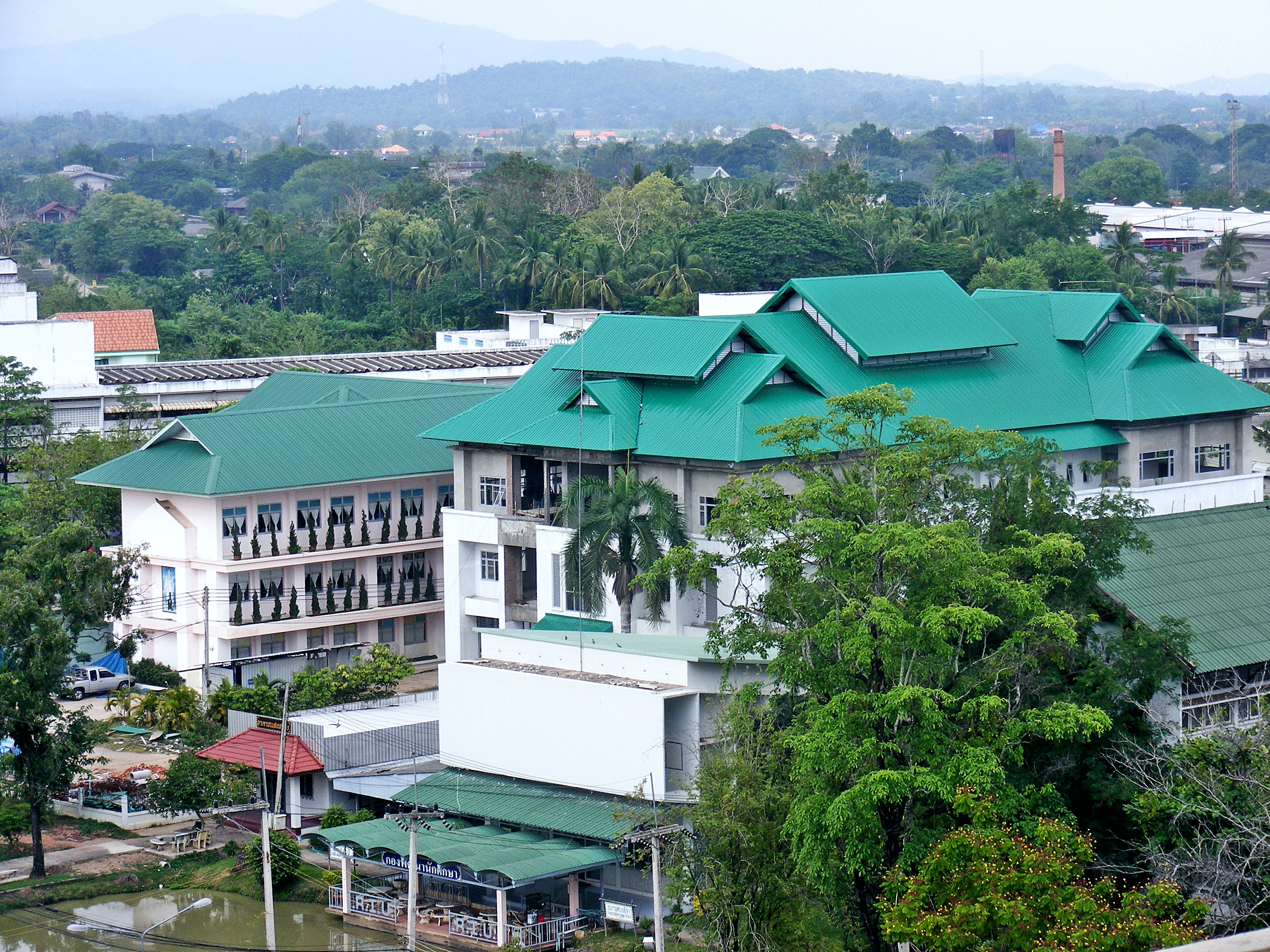
Uttaradit Rajabhat University

There are 40 universities in the Rajabhat Universities system. The universities are designed to provide higher education in provinces. They were formerly called Rajabhat Institutes and originally emerged as colleges of education. Admission is by competitive direct application. Some Rajabhat Universities have several campuses such as Suan Sunandha Rajabhat University.

	University	Initialism	Founded	Main campus	Website
1	Bansomdejchaopraya Rajabhat University	BSRU	1896	Bangkok	
2	Buri Ram Rajabhat University	BRU	1971	Buriram	
3	Chaiyaphum Rajabhat University	CPRU	1997	Chaiyaphum	
4	Chandrakasem Rajabhat University	CRU	1940	Bangkok	
5	Chiang Mai Rajabhat University	CMRU	1924	Chiang Mai	
6	Chiang Rai Rajabhat University	CRRU	1973	Chiang Rai	
7	Dhonburi Rajabhat University	DRU	1948	Bangkok	
9	Kamphaeng Phet Rajabhat University	KPRU	1973	Kamphaeng Phet	
10	Kanchanaburi Rajabhat University	KRU	1973	Kanchanaburi	
11	Lampang Rajabhat University	LPRU	1971	Lampang	
12	Loei Rajabhat University	LRU	1973	Loei	
13	Maha Sarakham Rajabhat University	RMU	1925	Maha Sarakham	
14	Muban Chom Bung Rajabhat University	MCRU	1954	Ratchaburi	
15	Nakhon Pathom Rajabhat University	NPRU	1936	Nakhon Pathom	
16	Nakhon Ratchasima Rajabhat University	NRRU	1913	Nakhon Ratchasima	
17	Nakhon Sawan Rajabhat University	NSRU	1922	Nakhon Sawan	
18	Nakhon Si Thammarat Rajabhat University	NSTRU	1957	Nakhon Si Thammarat	
19	Valaya Alongkorn Rajabhat University	VRU	1932	Bangkok	
20	Phetchabun Rajabhat University	PCRU	1973	Phetchabun	
21	Phetchaburi Rajabhat University	PBRU	1926	Phetchaburi	
22	Phranakhon Rajabhat University	PNRU	1892	Bangkok	
23	Phranakhon Si Ayutthaya Rajabhat University	ARU	1985	Phra Nakhon Si Ayutthaya	
24	Phuket Rajabhat University	PKRU	1971	Phuket	
25	Pibulsongkram Rajabhat University	PSRU	1926	Phitsanulok	
26	Rajanagarindra Rajabhat University	RRU	1940	Chachoengsao	
27	Rambhai Barni Rajabhat University	RBRU	1972	Chantaburi	
28	Roi Et Rajabhat University	RERU	2001	Roi Et	
29	Sakon Nakhon Rajabhat University	SNRU	1964	Sakon Nakhon	
30	Sisaket Rajabhat University	SSKRU	1997	Sisaket	
31	Songkhla Rajabhat University	SKRU	1919	Songkhla	
32	Suan Sunandha Rajabhat University	SSRU	1937	Bangkok	
33	Suratthani Rajabhat University	SRU	1973	Surat Thani	
34	Surin Rajabhat University	SRRU	1973	Surin	
35	Thepsatri Rajabhat University	TRU	1920	Lopburi	
36	Ubon Ratchathani Rajabhat University	UBRU	1947	Ubon Ratchathani	
37	Udon Thani Rajabhat University	UDRU	1923	Udon Thani	
38	Uttaradit Rajabhat University	URU	1936	Uttaradit	
39	Yala Rajabhat University	YRU	1934	Yala	

=== Rajamangala Universities of Technology ===
The Rajamangala University of Technology system includes nine schools. It was formerly a polytechnic institute system and then was renamed "Rajamangala Institute of Technology" before being granted university status. Admission is by direct application.

	University	Initialism	Founded	Main campus	Website
1	Rajamangala University of Technology Isan	RMUTI	1975	Nakhon Ratchasima	
2	Rajamangala University of Technology Krungthep	RMUTK	1975	Bangkok	
3	Rajamangala University of Technology Lanna	RMUTL	1975	Chiang Mai	
4	Rajamangala University of Technology Phra Nakhon	RMUTP	1975	Bangkok	
5	Rajamangala University of Technology Rattanakosin	RMUTR	1975	Bangkok	
6	Rajamangala University of Technology Srivijaya	RMUTSV	1975	Songkhla	
7	Rajamangala University of Technology Suvarnabhumi	RMUTSB	1975	Phra Nakhon Si Ayutthaya	
8	Rajamangala University of Technology Tawan-ok	RMUTTO	1975	Chonburi	
9	Rajamangala University of Technology Thanyaburi	RMUTT	1975	Pathum Thani	

=== Military and police academies ===
University	Initialism	Founded	Main campus	Website
National Defence College	NDC	1955	Bangkok	
Command and General staff College	CGSC	1902	Bangkok	
Phramongkutklao College of Medicine	PCM	1975	Bangkok	
Police Nursing College	PNC	1969	Bangkok	
Judge Advocate General School Thailand	JAG	1965	Bangkok	
Royal Thai Navy College of Nursing	RTNCN	1968	Bangkok	
Royal Thai Air Force Nursing College	RTAFNC	1958	Bangkok	
Chulachomklao Royal Military Academy	CRMA	1887	Nakhon Nayok	
Royal Thai Navy Academy	RTNA	1898	Samut Prakan	
Navaminda Kasatriyadhiraj Royal Thai Air Force Academy	RTAFA	1952	Bangkok	
Royal Police Cadet Academy	RPCA	1902	Nakhon Pathom	

=== College ===
Office of the Vocational Education Commission supervised 416 institutions all over the country for producing and developing professional manpower of the vocational certificate, diploma in technical education and Bachelor’s degree in various fields of technology and operation. There are 9 programs comprising more than 350 subject areas. The Management Centers have been established in 5 regions to promote academic work and develop vocational education in 77 provinces. The management of vocational education colleges at provincial level is linked together. Types of colleges can be found as follows:

	Colleges and Institutes	Initialism	Founded	Main campus	Website
1	Kanchanapisek Samutprakan Technical College	KPSPTC	1994	Samutprakan	
2	Rasisalai Technical College	RSTECH	2012	Sisaket	
3	Amnatcharoen Technical College	ANT	1993	Amnat Charoen	

=== Education agency and institutes ===
University	Initialism	Founded	Main campus	Website
Civil Aviation Training Center	CATC	1961	Bangkok	
Irrigation College	IRID	1938	Nonthaburi	
Merchant Marine Training Center	MMTC	1972	Samut Prakan	
Supervisory Unit	SU	2018	Bangkok	

== Private universities and colleges ==
=== Universities ===
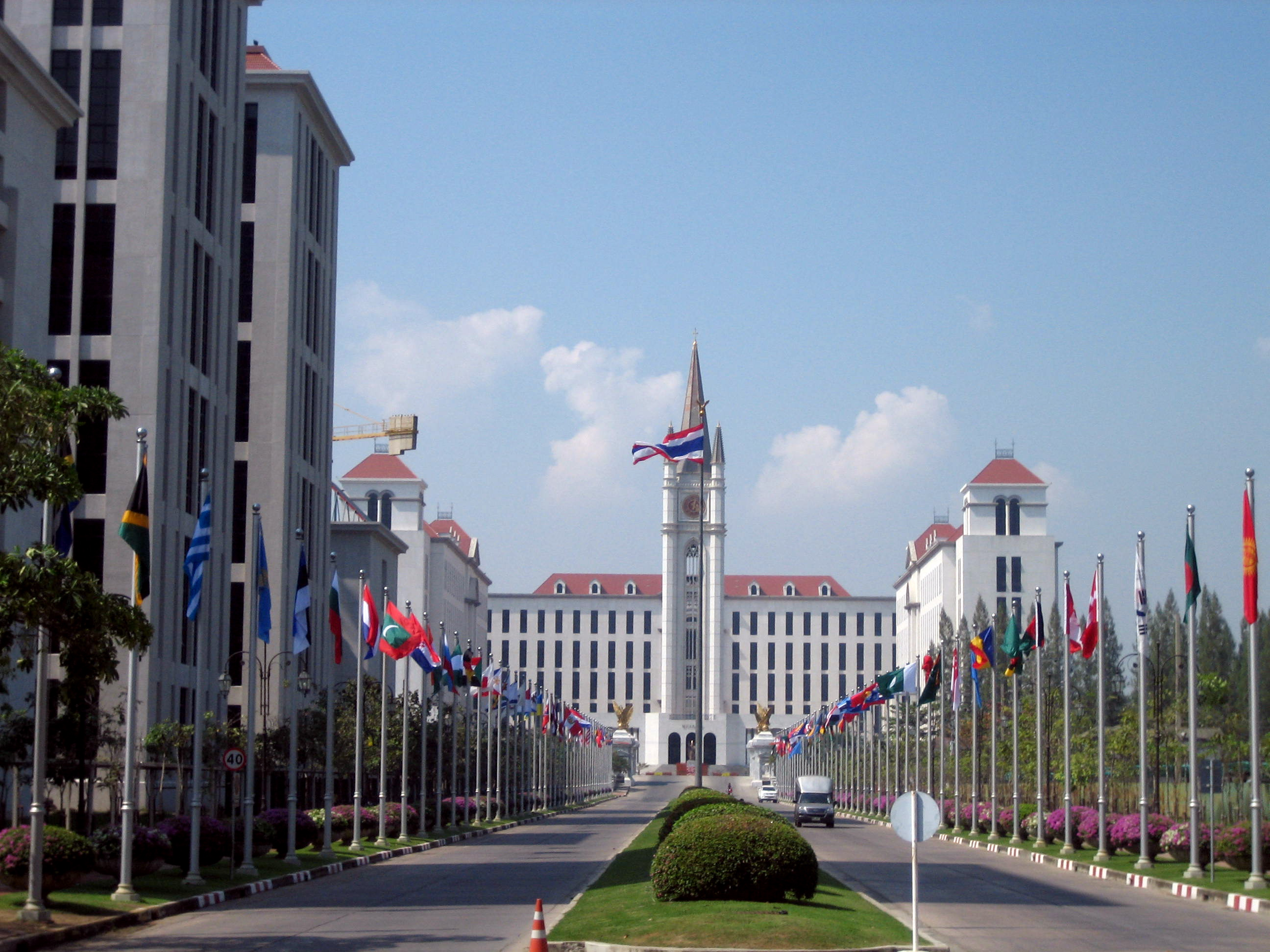
Assumption University

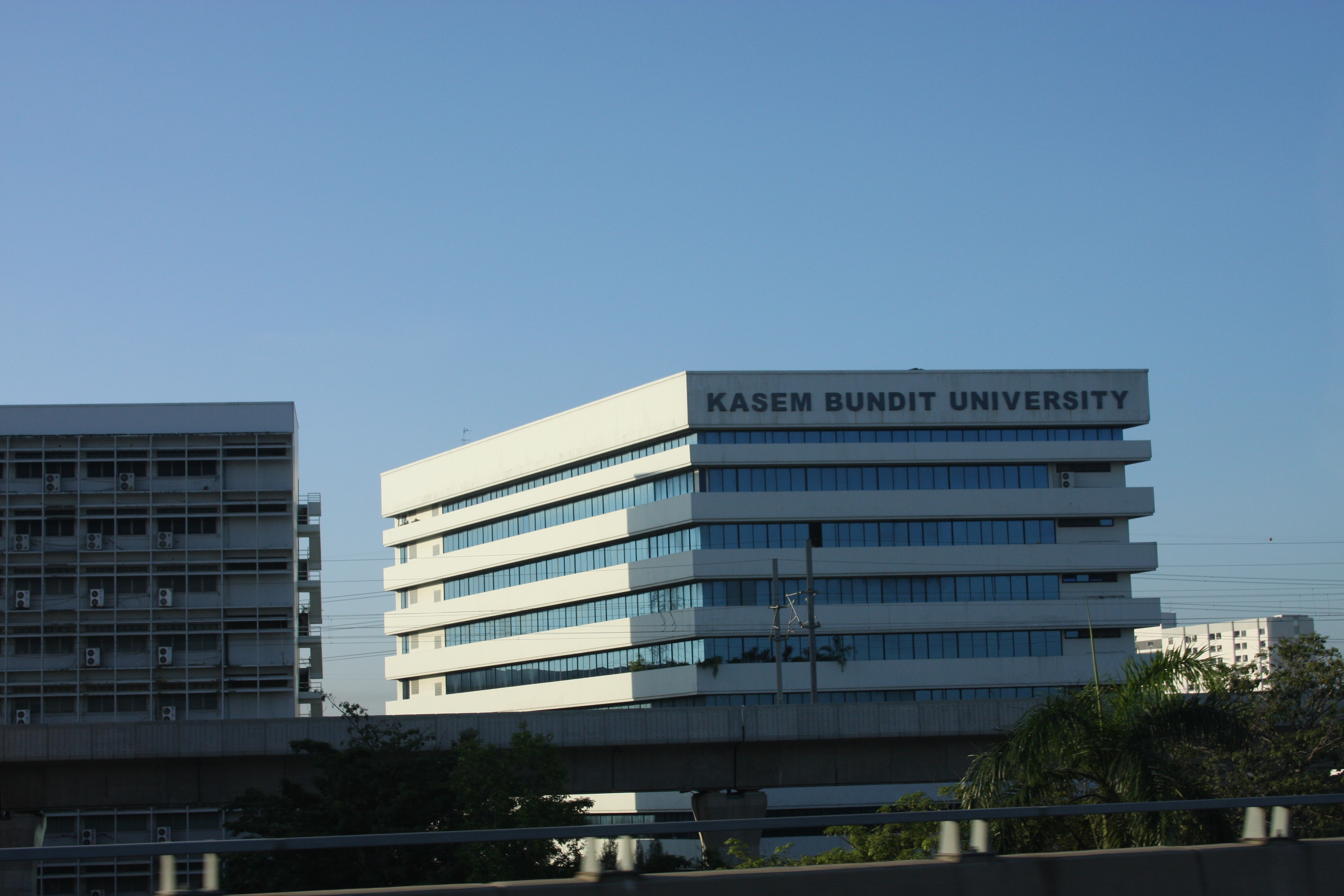
Kasem Bundit University

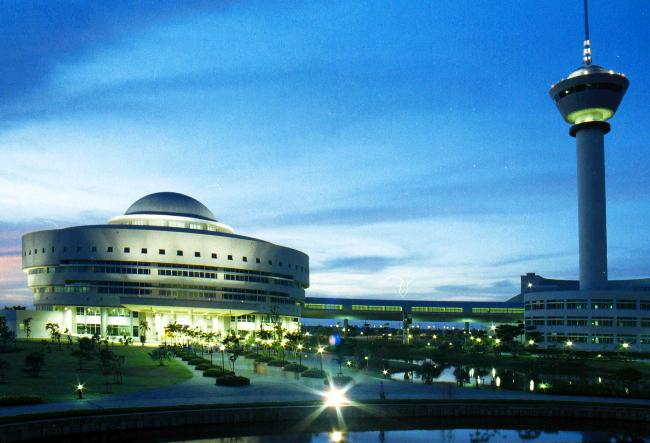
Shinawatra University

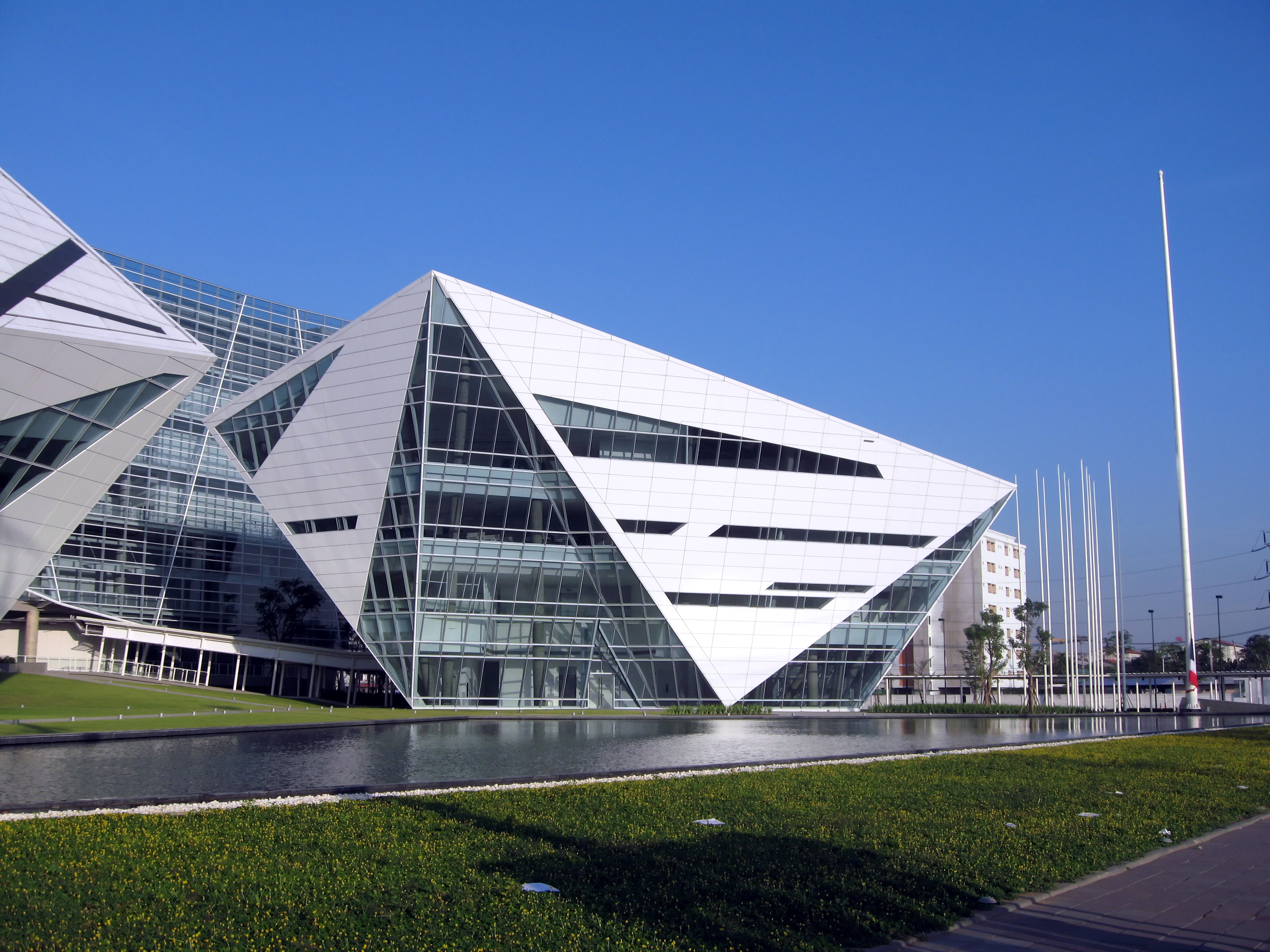
Bangkok University

The Ministry of University Affairs's (MUA) Directory of Schools and Universities.

	University	Initialism	Founded	Main campus	Website
1	Asia-Pacific International University	AIU	1947	Saraburi	
2	Asian University (Defunct as of August 2017)		1993	Chonburi	
3	Assumption University	AU	1969	Bangkok	
4	Bangkok University	BU	1962	Pathum Thani	
5	Bangkokthonburi University	BTU	2002	Bangkok	
6	Chaopraya University	CPU	1995	Nakhon Sawan	
7	Christian University	CTU	1983	Nakhon Pathom	
8	Dhurakij Pundit University	DPU	1968	Bangkok	
9	E-sarn University	ESU	2002	Khon Kaen	
10	Eastern Asia University	EAU	1996	Pathumthani	
11	Hatyai University	HU	1996	Songkhla	
12	Huachiew Chalermprakiet University	HCU	1941	Bangkok	
13	Kasem Bundit University	KBU	1987	Bangkok	
14	Krirk University	KRIRK	1952	Bangkok	
15	Mahanakorn University of Technology	MUT	1990	Bangkok	
16	North Eastern University	NEU	1988	Khon Kaen	
17	North Chiang Mai University	NCU	1999	Chiang Mai	
18	Pathumthani University	PTU	1999	Pathum Thani	
19	Payap University	PYU	1974	Chiang Mai	
20	The University of Central Thailand	TUCT	1986	Nakhon Sawan	
21	Ratchathani University	RTU	1993	Ubon Ratchathani	
22	Rattana Bundit University	RBAC	1997	Bangkok	
23	Saint John's University	SJU	1989	Bangkok	
24	Shinawatra University	SIU	1999	Pathumthani	
25	Siam University	SU	1965	Bangkok	
26	South-East Asia University	SAU	1976	Bangkok	
27	Sripatum University	SPU	1970	Bangkok	
28	Stamford International University	STIU	1995	Phetchaburi	
29	Rangsit University	RSU	1985	Pathumthani	
30	The Far Eastern University	FEU	1999	Chiang Mai	
31	University of the Thai Chamber of Commerce	UTCC	1940	Bangkok	
32	Vongchavalitkul University	VU	1984	Nakhon Ratchasima	
33	Webster University Thailand	WUTC	1999	Phetchaburi	
34	Western University	WTU	1997	Kanchanaburi	
35	Fatoni University	YIU	1998	Pattani	
36	Nation University (Yonok University)	NTU	1988	Lampang	
37	The Eastern University of Management and Technology	UMT	1999	Ubon Ratchathani	
38	Thonburi University	ThonburiU	1998	Bangkok	
39	North Bangkok University	NBU	2001	Bangkok	

=== Institutes ===
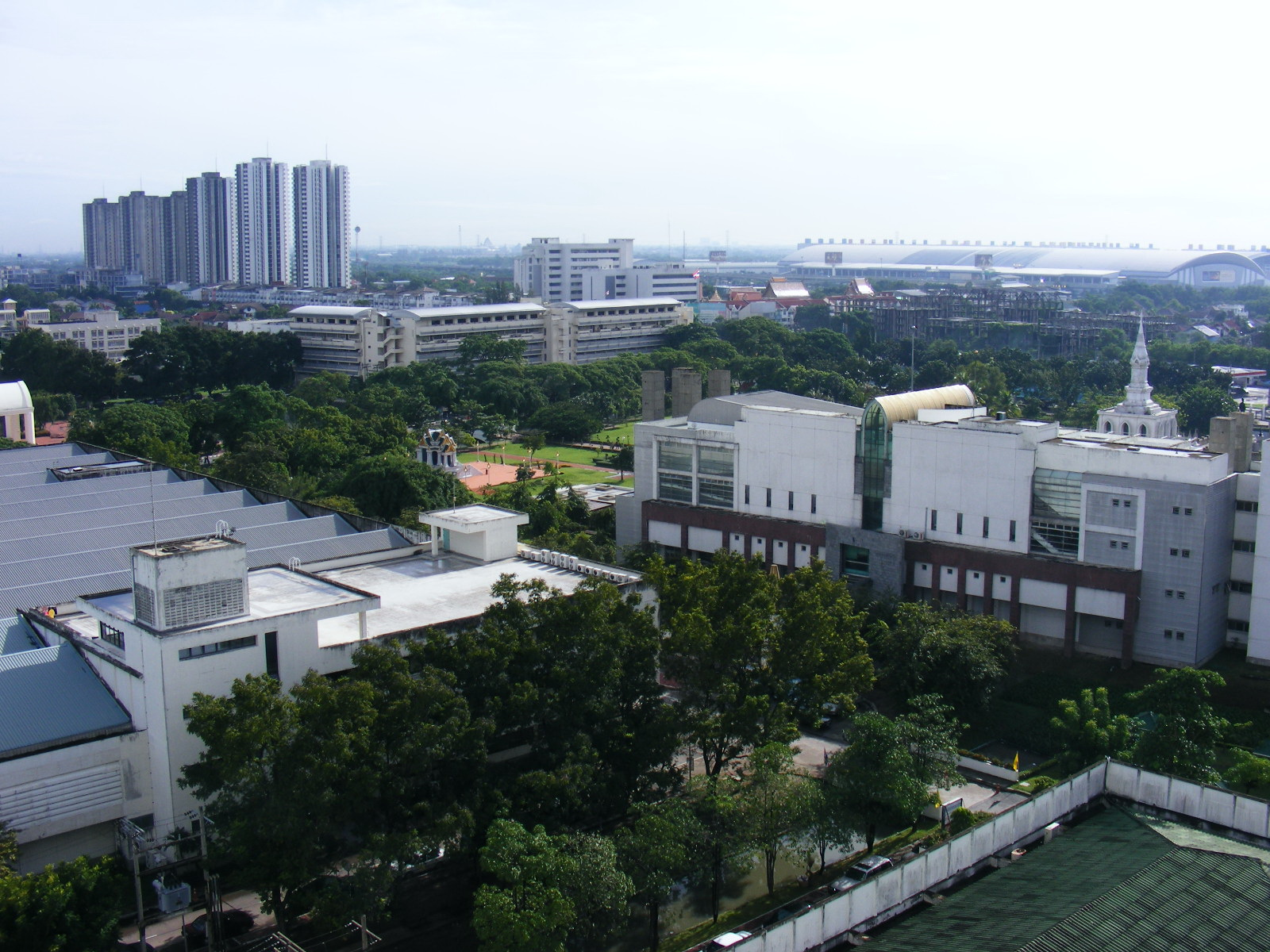
Sukhothai Thammathirat Open University

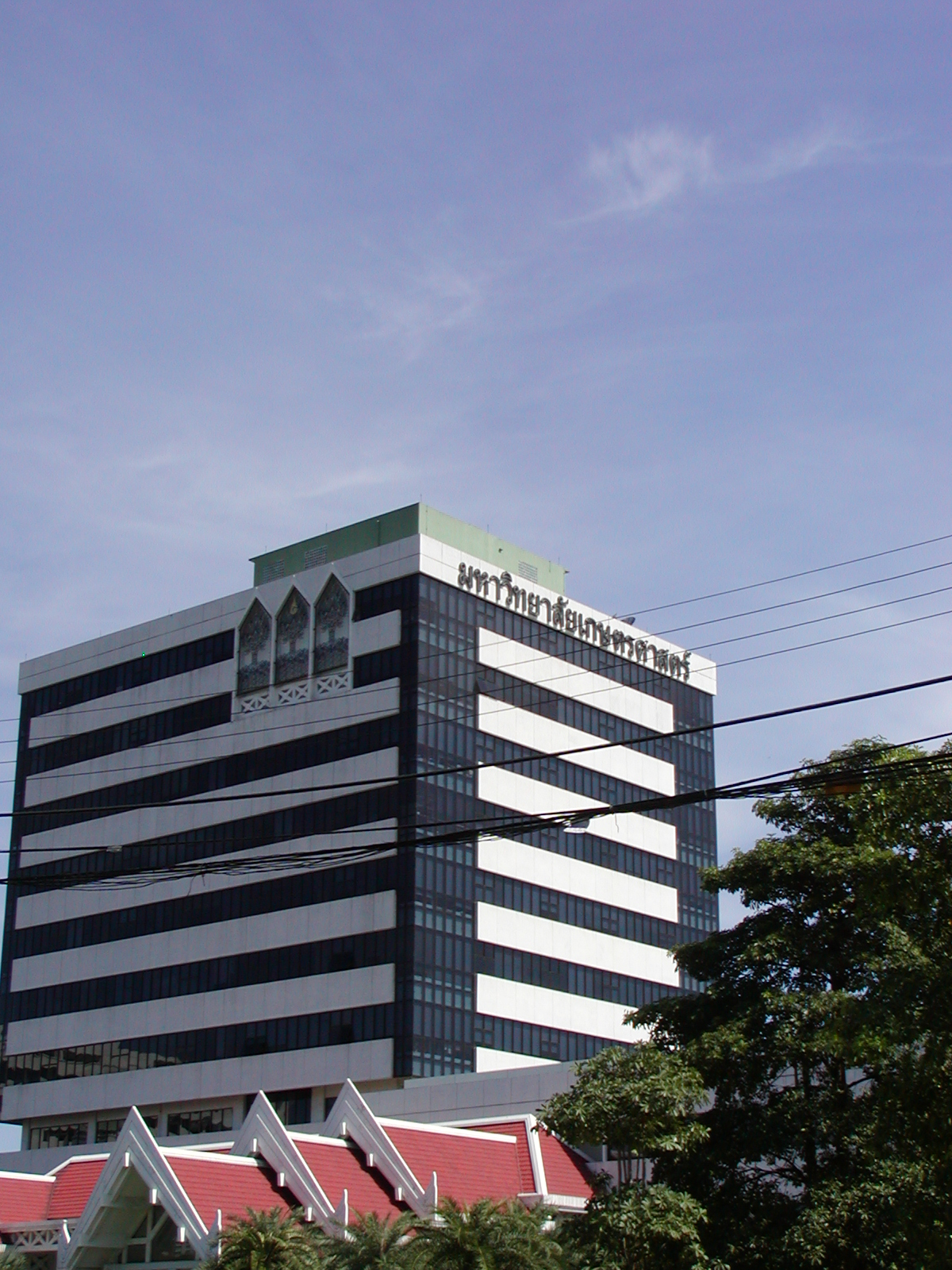
Kasetsart University

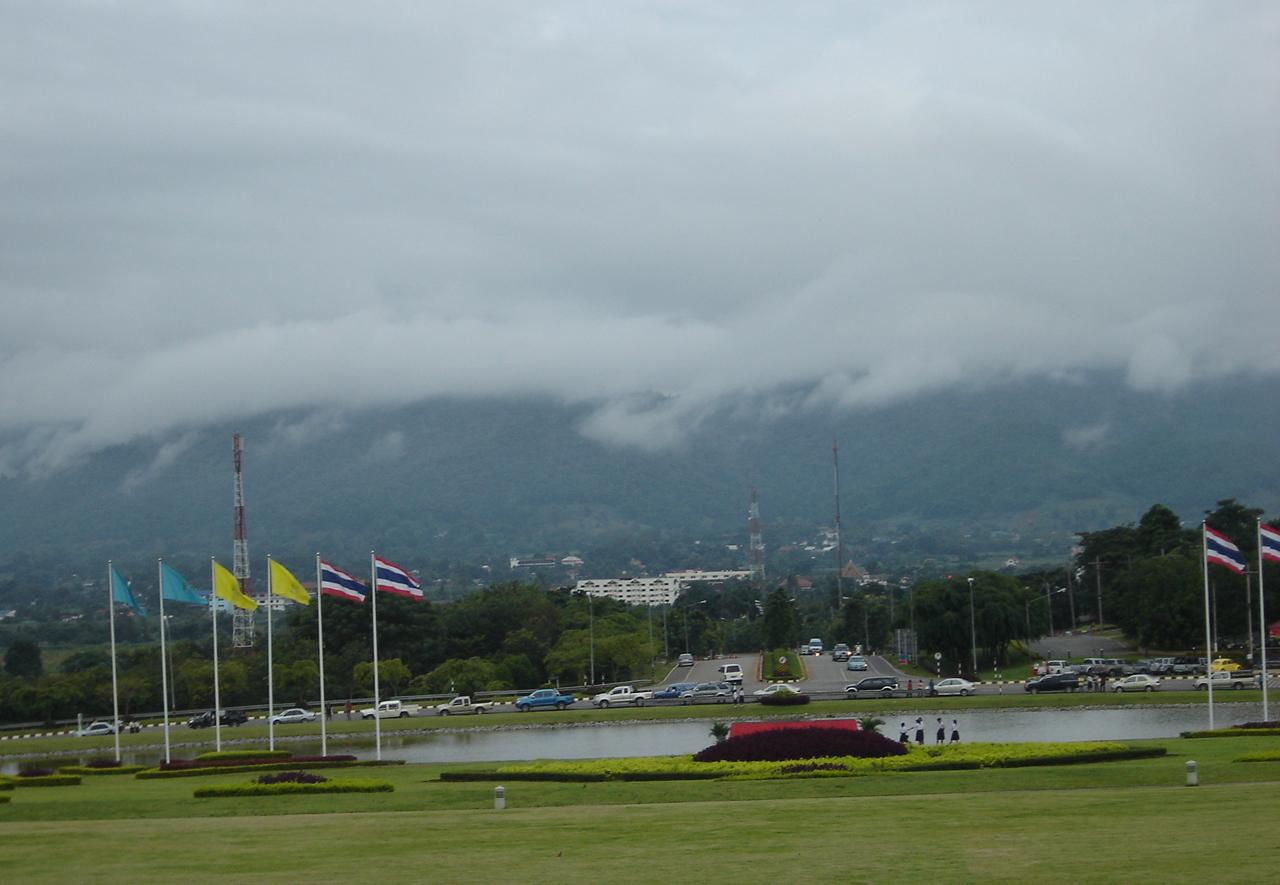
Mae Fah Luang University

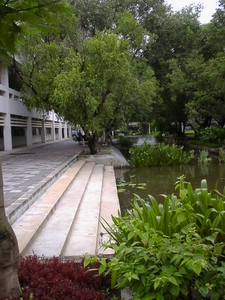
Asian Institute of Technology

	Colleges and institutes	Initialism	Founded	Main campus	Website
1	Arsom Silp Institute of the Arts	AS	2006	Bangkok	
2	Bangkok School of Management	BSM	1998	Bangkok	
2	Raffles International College(Bangkok)	RBK	1995	Bangkok	
4	Institute of Technology Ayothaya	ITA	2007	Phra Nakhon Si Ayutthaya	
5	Kantana Institute	KI	2010	Bangkok	
6	Learning Institute For Everyone	LIFE	2010	Samut Songkram	
7	Panyapiwat Institute of Management	PIM	2007	Nonthaburi	
8	Rajapark Institute	RI	1993	Bangkok	
9	SAE Institute Bangkok	SAE	2002	Bangkok	
10	Thai-Nichi Institute of Technology	TNI	2005	Bangkok	
11	Vidyasirimedhi Institute of Science and Technology	VISTEC	2015	Rayong	
12	Unicentre College Thailand	UCTH	2019	Bangkok	
13	Siam Thanyaburi Child and Elderly Care School	STCECS	2006	Bangkok	
14	Galileo Maritime Academy	GMA	2012	Bangkok	https://galileomaritimeacademy.com

=== Colleges ===
	Colleges and Institutes	Initialism	Founded	Main campus	Website
1	Banharn-Jamsai Polytechnic College	BJPC	1990	Suphanburi	
1	Bangkok Suvarnabhumi University	BSU	2006	Bangkok	
2	Bundit Boriharnthurakit College	BBC		Khon Kaen	
3	Cambridge College (Thailand)	CCT	2011	Phitsanulok	
4	Chalermkarnchana University	CU	2004	Sisaket	
5	Chiangrai College	CRC	2003	Chiang Rai	
6	College of Asian Scholars	CAS	1999	Khon Kaen	
7	Dusit Thani College	DTC	1993	Bangkok	
8	International Buddhist College	IBC	2005	Songkhla	
9	International Hotel and Tourism Industry Management School	I-TIM	1988	Bangkok	
10	Lampang Inter-Tech College	LITC	2004	Lampang	
11	Lumnamping College	LPC	1998	Tak	
12	Nakhonratchasima College	NMC	2002	Nakhon Ratchasima	
13	Phanomwan College	PLC	2007	Nakhon Ratchasima	
14	Phitsanulok University	PLU	2002	Pitsanulok	
15	Raffles International College		1993	Bangkok	
16	Saengtham College		1975	Nakhon Pathom	
17	Saint Louis College	SLC	1985	Bangkok	
18	Santapol College	STU	1998	Udon Thani	
19	Siam Technology College	STC	1965	Bangkok	
20	Southeast Bangkok College	SBC	1999	Bangkok	
21	Southern College of Technology	SCT	1999	Nakhon Sri Thammarat	
22	St Theresa International College	STIC	2000	Nakhon Nayok	
23	Tapee University	TU	1999	Surat Thani	
24	Thongsook College	TSC	1994	Bangkok	
25	Banglamung INTER-TECH Technological College	BITC	2007	Chon Buri	
26	Loengnoktha Industrial and Community Education College	LICEC	2007	Yasothon	
27	Sriworakarn Technology College	SWK	1972	Chachoengsao	
28	Singburi Vocational College	SIVC	1938	Singburi	
29	Ekawan Vocational College	EVC	2001	Amnat Charoen	
30	Namphong Technical College	NTCKK	1997	khonkaen	
31	Phatthalung Technical College	PTL	1933	Phatthalung	
32	Kantaralak Technical College	KTL	1992	Sisaket	
33	Nonthaburi Technical College	NTC	1992	Nonthaburi	
34	Suphanburi Technical College	STC	1968	Suphanburi	
35	Nakhonratchasima Polytechnic College	NMPTC	1980	Nakhon Ratchasima	
36	Samutprakan Technical College	SPTC	1938	Samutprakan	
37	Pathumthani Technical College	PTTC	1939	Pathumthani	
38	Rakthai Namyuen Business Administration Technological College	RTECH	2005	Ubon Ratchathani	
39	Boonthavorn Technology College	BTC	2012	Pathumthani	
40	Songphinong Industrial and Community Education College	SICEC	1997	Suphanburi	
41	Udonthani Vocational College	UDVC	1938	Udon Thani	
42	Don Bosco Technological College	DB	1946	Bangkok	
43	Nongnguluem Pitthayakhom School	npkschool	1975	Nakhon Ratchasima	
44	Chonburi Vocational College	Chcvc	1979	Chonburi	
45	Bangkok Arts and Crafts College	ARTSBKK	1936	Bangkok	
45	KHUKHAN Industrial and Community Education College	KHICE	2016	Sisaket	
46	Jathupat Suksasongkhro Technological College	JSK	2016	ubonratchathani	
47	Phayakkhaphum Phisai Industrial and Community Education College	PPICE	1995	Maha Sarakham	
48	Phetchaburi Polytechnic College	ppc	1996	Phetchaburi	
49	Ranong Technical College	RNTC	1977	Ranong	
50	Lopburi Technical College 2	LBTC2	1996	Lopburi	

== Intergovernmental institute ==
	Colleges and Institutes	Initialism	Founded	Main campus	Website
1	Asian Institute of Technology	AIT	1959	Pathum Thani	

== Renowned foreign higher education institutes ==
In 2017, the government issued a decree to promote the establishment of renowned foreign higher education institute in the country. The decree allowed foreign institutes to set up entities in EEC or collaborate with local public universities to set up entities that can award their own degrees.

	Universities and Institutes	Initialism	Founded	Main campus	Website
1	CMKL University	CMKL	2017	Bangkok	
2	Amata University	AMATA	2018	Chonburi	
3	Asian Institute of Hospitality Management	AIHM	2019	Bangkok	

=== Institute of Community Colleges ===
- establish : (B.E.)2545
- website : http://iccs.ac.th

Institute of Community Colleges
	Community Colleges	Inititalism	establish (B.E.)	location (Main Campus)	Website
1	Trat Community College	TRATCC	2547	Trat	
2	Tak Community College	TAKCC	2545	Tak	
3	์Narathiwat Community College	NCC	2545	Narathiwat	
4	Nan Community College	NANCC	2554	Nan	
5	Buriram Community College	BRCC	2545	Buriram	
6	Pattanee Community College	PNCC	2547	Pattanee	
7	Phang-nga Community College	PNGCC	2547	Phang-nga	
8	Phichit Community College	PCC	2545	Phichit	
9	Phrae Community College	PHRCC	2549	Phrae	
10	Mukdahan Community College	MUKCC	2547	Mukdahan	
11	Maehongson Community College	MCC	2545	Maehongson	
12	Yasothon Community College	YASOCC	2547	Yasothon	
13	Yala Community College	YCC	2547	Yala	
14	Ranong Community College	RNCC	2545	Ranong	
15	Songkha Community College	SK-CC	2550	Songkha	
16	Satun Community College	STCC	2547	Satun	
17	Samutsakhon Community College	SMKCC	2547	Samutsakhon	
18	Sakaew Community College	SKCC	2545	Sakaew	
19	Nong Bua Lamphu Community College	NBCC	2545	Nong Bua Lamphu	
20	Uthaitanee Community College	UTCC	2545	Uthaitanee	
21	Sukhothai Community College	SKTCC	2565	Sukhothai	

== Joint schools ==
- Joint Graduate School of Energy and Environment (JGSEE)
- Thailand Graduate Institute of Science and Technology (TGIST)
- Thailand Advanced Institute of Science and Technology (TAIST)

== Groups of universities ==
- LAOTSE
- Greater Mekong Sub-region Academic and Research Network

== See also ==
Lists of universities and colleges by country

- Lists of universities and colleges
- Education in Thailand
- List of schools in Thailand
- List of medical schools in Thailand
