= Mission College =

Mission College may refer to:

- Asia-Pacific International University, formerly known as Mission College
- Mission College (California), a two-year community college in Santa Clara, California
- Los Angeles Mission College, a two-year community college in the Sylmar district of Los Angeles, California
- The College of Missions (Danish: Missionskollegiet), a defunct Danish government agency that funded and directed Lutheran missions
- Mission College Preparatory High School, in San Luis Obispo, California
