= Pornchai Mongkhonvanit =

Thai academic administrator

- Born: 25 November 1958 (age 67); Bangkok, Thailand
- Education: Saint Gabriel's College; Kasetsart University; University of Wisconsin–Madison
- Known for: President of Siam University
- Spouse: Chollada Mongkhonvanit
- Children: Kritphong Mongkhonvanit; Chutiporn Mongkhonvanit; Nichapa Mongkhonvanit

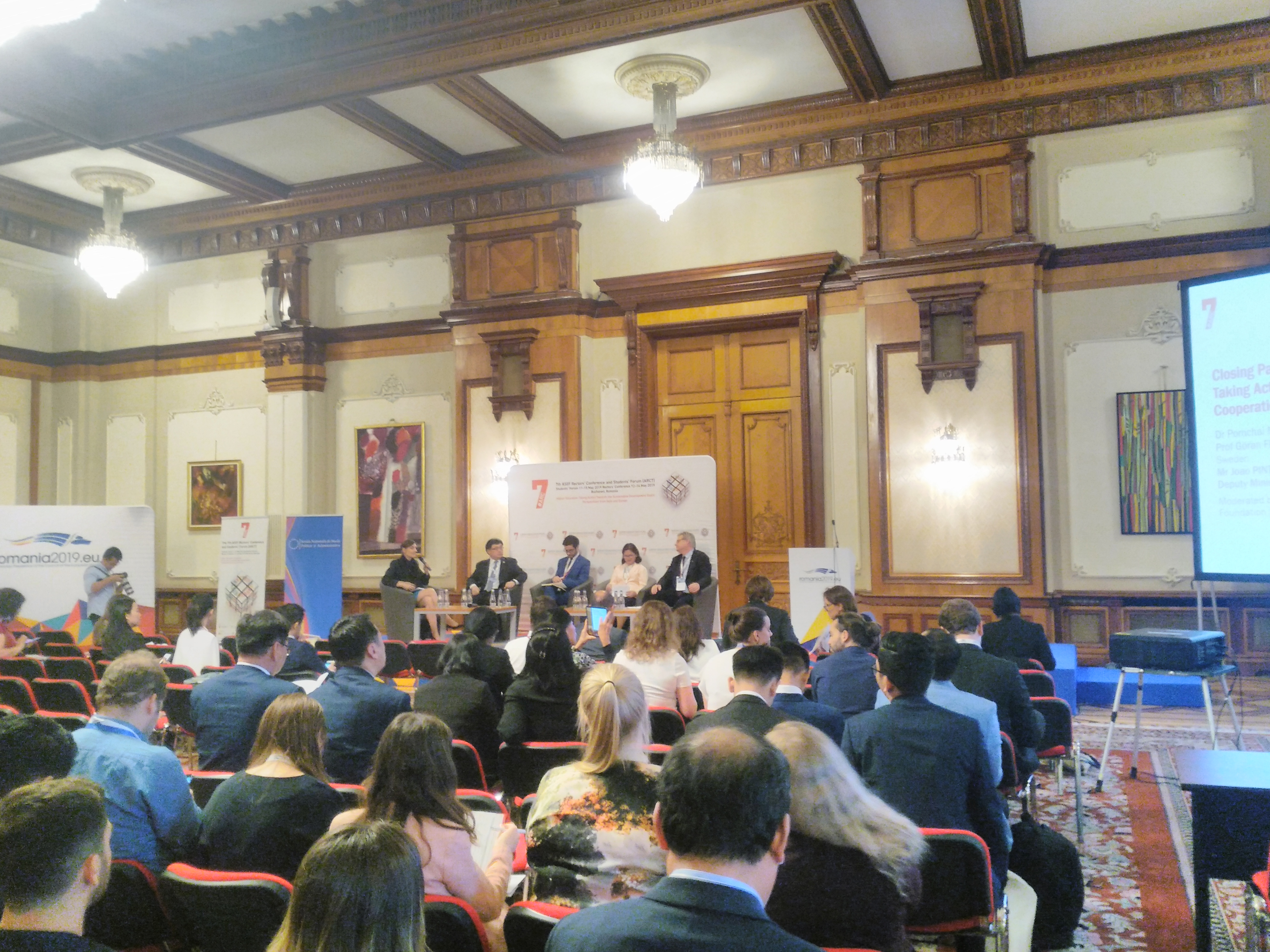
Professor Mongkhonvanit at the Closing Panel of 7th ASEF Rectors' Conference

Pornchai Mongkhonvanit (Thai: พรชัย มงคลวนิช, RTGS: Phonchai Mongkhonwanit; born 25 November 1958) is the president of Siam University and the President Emeritus of the International Association of University Presidents. Concurrently, he is also the chair person of the advisory board of the Association of Universities in Asia and the Pacific, as well as a member of the administrative board of the International Association of Universities. He is also a former president of the Association of Private Higher Education Institutions of Thailand and former president of the Thailand chapter of Phi Delta Kappa honors society.

== Education ==
He holds a Master of Business Administration in finance, investment, and banking from the University of Wisconsin-Madison, a Bachelor of Engineering in Mechanical Engineering from Kasetsart University. He received a degree from National Defense College, and has studied at the graduate school of education, Institute of Educational Management, Harvard University.

== Awards ==
He is the recipient of numerous honors including: The Medals of Honors of the International Association of University Presidents, The Medal of Honors from Kyung Hee University and Soka University. He was the recipient of Doctor of Educational Management, honoris causa from Angeles University Foundation and Doctor of Management, honoris causa from Philippine Women's University. In 2011, the University of the Cordilleras conferred him honorary degree of Doctor of Humanities. He received distinguished alumni award from Kasetsart University and Saint Gabriel's College as well as being listed as a notable alumnus in the field of Education from University of Wisconsin–Madison. He is an honorary professor at the Autonomous University of Guadalajara and Guizhou University.

== Personal life ==
Pornchai is married to Chollada Jungprasert, a scholar in the field of Hotel Studies and Tourism. They have three children.
