= Kapila Abhayawansa =

Sri Lankan academic

Kapila Abhayawansa PhD, (Sri Lanka) is the Dean of the Faculty of Religious Studies, International Buddhist College, Thailand.

== Career ==
Prior to joining the college, he was a professor and head of the Department of Buddhist Culture at the Postgraduate Institute of Pali and Buddhist Studies, University of Kelaniya, Sri Lanka. His areas of specialization are the history of Western and Eastern philosophy, Mahayana Buddhist philosophy, and Buddhist monastic discipline.
