= Asian University =

University in Thailand

- Motto: University of the Future
- Active: 18 June 1993–2017
- Location: Chonburi, Thailand; 12.845°N 101.008°E
- Colours: Yellow, Red, Blue
- Website: www.asianu.ac.th

Asian University (Asian U), formerly the Asian University of Science and Technology, was founded in 1993, initially with the academic co-operation of Imperial College London. It was an international university using English as the language of instruction for all programs. Asian University was on the eastern seaboard, a 30 km drive from the seaside resort of Pattaya and two hours from Bangkok. In 2017, the university council submitted the request to cease its operation through Office of the Higher Education Commission, Ministry of Education due to financial reasons. Its degree accreditations remain valid and were ratified by Office of the Civil Service Commission (OCSC) and Office of the Higher Education Commission (OHEC).

The permission to cease its operation was granted by H.E.Teerakiat Jaroensettasin, the minister of education at a time and university was officially closed in August 2017.

== History ==
The privately owned university was founded when Lord Oxburgh, then rector of Imperial College London, signed the memorandum of understanding (MOU) in Bangkok to provide support for Asian University. Sir Edward Parkes, KBE, one of the UK's foremost academics, played an important role as chairman of the academic advisory board as Asian University took on its final form. The founding chairman was H.E. Anand Panyarachun, Hon. KBE and a former prime minister. The school first opened its doors to students in 1998 and closed in August 2017 due to financial reasons.

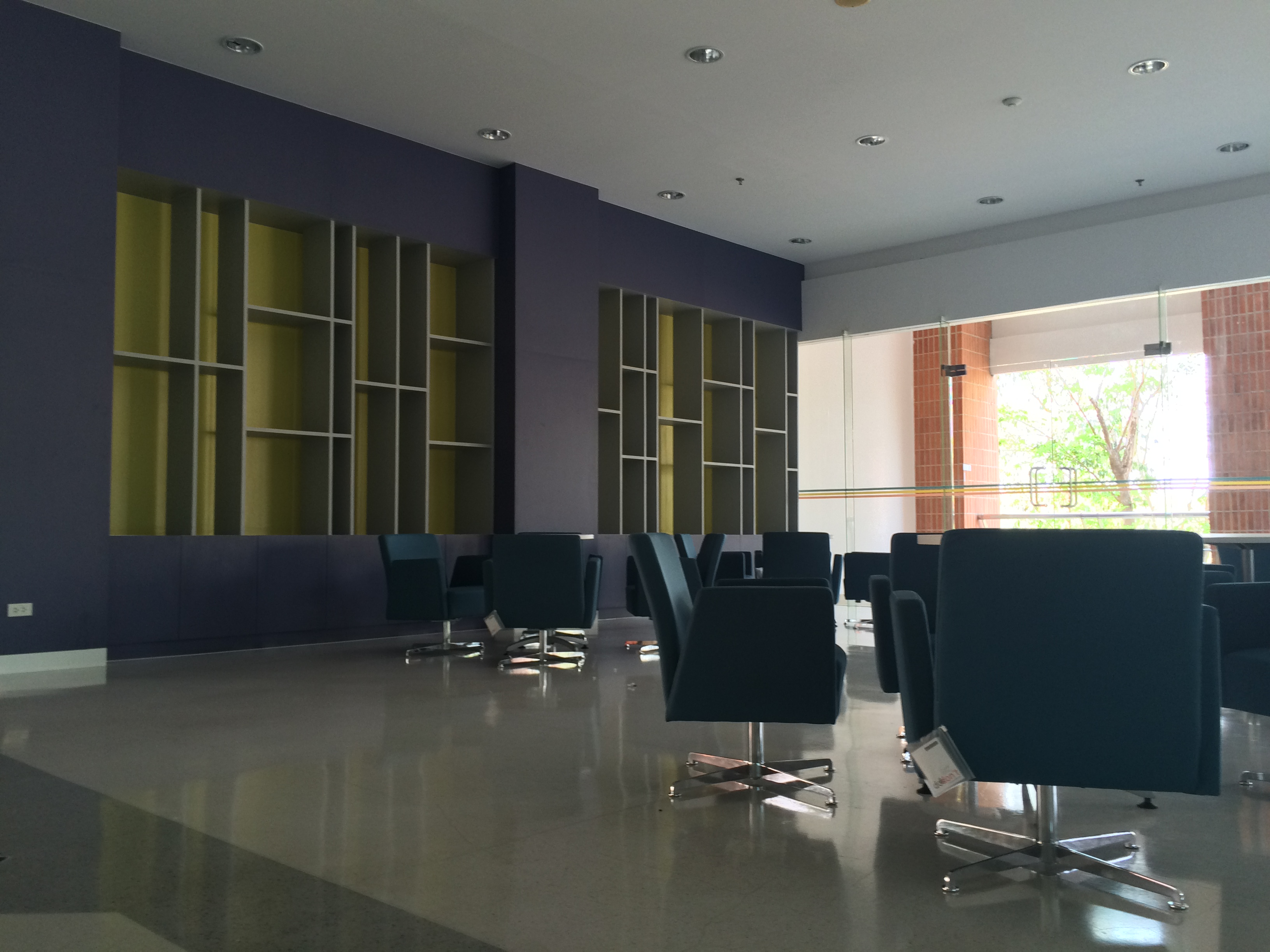
Asian University Lobby, Academic Building

== Academic programmes ==
The undergraduate programme for August 2015 was as follows:

- Bachelor of Arts in English for Business Communication
- Bachelor of Arts in Digital Content (B.A., Digital Content). This programme had three concentration areas:

Digital communication
Digital content and animation
Digital content, game design

- Bachelor of Business Administration in Business Services (B.B.A., Business Services). Its five concentration areas:

Culinary arts and restaurant management
Finance
Hospitality and hotel management
International business
Marketing

- Bachelor of Science in Technology and Engineering Management (B.Sc., Technology and Engineering Management). Four concentration areas:

Facilities management
Project management
Technology management
Telecommunications and network management

In addition to the undergraduate programs, the university offered English training for Thai school teachers using the Common European Framework of Reference for Languages (CEFR).

== See also ==
- List of universities in Thailand
- List of colleges and universities
