= Bongkosh Rittichainuwat =

Thai scholar

Bongkosh Ngamsom Rittichainuwat
- Born: Bongkosh Ngamsom Rittichainuwat; Thailand
- Awards: French Poetry Chanting award by Her Royal Highness Princess

Academic background
- Education: Chulalongkorn University (BH); Oklahoma State University (PhD)

Academic work
- Discipline: Hospitality; Tourism
- Institutions: Siam University, SAGE Publications

Bongkosh Ngamsom Rittichainuwat (Thai: บงกช งามสม ฤทธิชัยนุวฒัน์, RTGS: Bongkot Ngansom Ritthichainuwat) is a Thai researcher, scholar, professor and academic administrator. She is currently Dean & Professor of the international College of Hospitality & Tourism Management at Siam University.

== Education & Career ==
She serves as the Director of Marketing at the Asia-Pacific Council on Hotel, Restaurant, and Institutional Education (APac-CHRIE) and as a board member of the Asia Pacific Travel Association. She is on the editorial board of Tourism Management Perspectives, Asia Pacific Journal of Travel Research, and Journal of Hospitality and Tourism Research. She also published a book titled “Special Interest Tourism” with Cambridge Scholar Publishing, UK. She received her Bachelor of Arts from Chulalongkorn University, her Master of Hospitality Management from Conrad N. Hilton College, University of Houston, and her Ph.D. in Hospitality Administration from Oklahoma State University. Her industry designations include an Exhibition Management Degree from the UFI University of Cooperative Education in Ravensburg, Germany, the Certified Incentive Specialist designation by the Society for Incentive Travel Excellence, and the Certified in Exhibition Management designation by the International Association of Exhibitions and Events. In 2022, Journal of Travel and Tourism Marketing, Routledge, the USA ranked her as the most prominent researcher in Thailand in terms of the highest number of citations and publications in the area of Thailand tourism published in Quartile 1 Scopus international journals.

== Books ==
- Rittichainuwat, Bongkosh N. (2018). Special Interest Tourism, 3rd Edition. Cambridge Scholars Publishing. ISBN 978-1-5275-1992-3.
- Exhibition Manual
- Convention 101
