= Bangkok Adventist Hospital =

Coordinates: 13°45′28″N 100°31′9″E

Bangkok Adventist Hospital (Thai: โรงพยาบาลมิชชั่น)
- Seventh-day Adventist Church

Geography
- Location: Bangkok, Thailand

Organisation
- Type: General
- Affiliated university: Asia-Pacific International University School of Nursing

Services
- Emergency department: Yes
- Beds: 120

History
- Founded: 1937

Links
- Website: http://www.mission-hospital.org/

Bangkok Adventist Hospital, also known locally as Mission Hospital, is a non-profit general hospital with a registered capacity of 200 beds and 24 bassinets, located on Phitsanulok Road in Bangkok, Thailand. It is owned and operated by the Christian Medical Foundation of the Seventh-day Adventist Church in Thailand under the auspices of the Southeast Asia Union Mission (SAUM) a regional component of the Adventist Church, and is part of global Adventist healthcare system. It is one of three Adventist hospitals in Southeast Asia, the others being in Phuket, Thailand, and the Penang Adventist Hospital in Malaysia.

Bangkok Adventist Hospital is one of ten private hospitals in Thailand that have received Hospital Accreditation (HA).

== History ==
The hospital was founded in 1937 with funds provided Captain Thomas Hall, a merchant seaman, and was operated by Dr. Ralph Waddell, his wife Ellen, Mr. Pleng Vitiamyalaksna and Pastor Kon Vui-leong. In 1940 the facility was expanded with an additional 30 beds and became known as the "Annex". With the Japanese invasion of Thailand during Second World War, the Annex was closed, and all missionaries fled the country for their safety. However, part of the clinic continued its operation under the direction of Mr. Pleng, a medical assistant, and Dr. S. Bene, a Romanian physician. At end of the war, the overseas staff returned and the hospital was reopened. The former Annex became the initial building for the expanded "Bangkok Sanatorium & Hospital".

The Bangkok Adventist Hospital School of Nursing was established in 1947. In 1986, a Bachelor of Science in Nursing was introduced and accredited. The school of nursing, along with Southeast Asia Union College (S.A.U.C), merged in 1992 to form Mission College. It was accredited by the Ministry of University Affairs in 1994. On August 4, 2008, Mission College received university status from the Royal Thai Government and was renamed Asia-Pacific International University (A.I.U). Two years of pre-clinical studies are conducted on the A.I.U. campus at Muak Lek, while the final two years of study are on the Bangkok Adventist Hospital/A.I.U. campus. The hospital's A.I.U. campus includes classrooms, a library, and dormitory facilities, along with clinical nursing facilities inside the hospital. In 1955 the School of Midwifery and the School of Nursing were officially opened. The total bed capacity was increased in 1958 to 180.

In 1973 Mission Hospital adopted the name "Bangkok Adventist Hospital". The new Ralph Waddell Wing was opened in 1983 to increase patients accommodation. On the hospital's 50th anniversary in 1987, the Pleng Vitiamalaksna building was added to provide beds for Obstetric and Pediatrics, along with some auxiliary services.

In 1990, Mission Health Promotion Center, capable of housing 60 people, was launched in Saraburi Province, north of Bangkok. The Health Promotion Center is located adjacent to the Muak Lek campus of Asia-Pacific International University.

== See also ==
- List of Seventh-day Adventist hospitals
- List of hospitals in Thailand
