= Tapee College =

Private university in Surat Thani, Thailand

Coordinates: 9°7′35″N 99°19′5″E

Tapee College (Thai: วิทยาลัยตาปี) is a private college in the city of Surat Thani, Surat Thani Province, Thailand. The college was established in 1999 and named after the major river of the province.

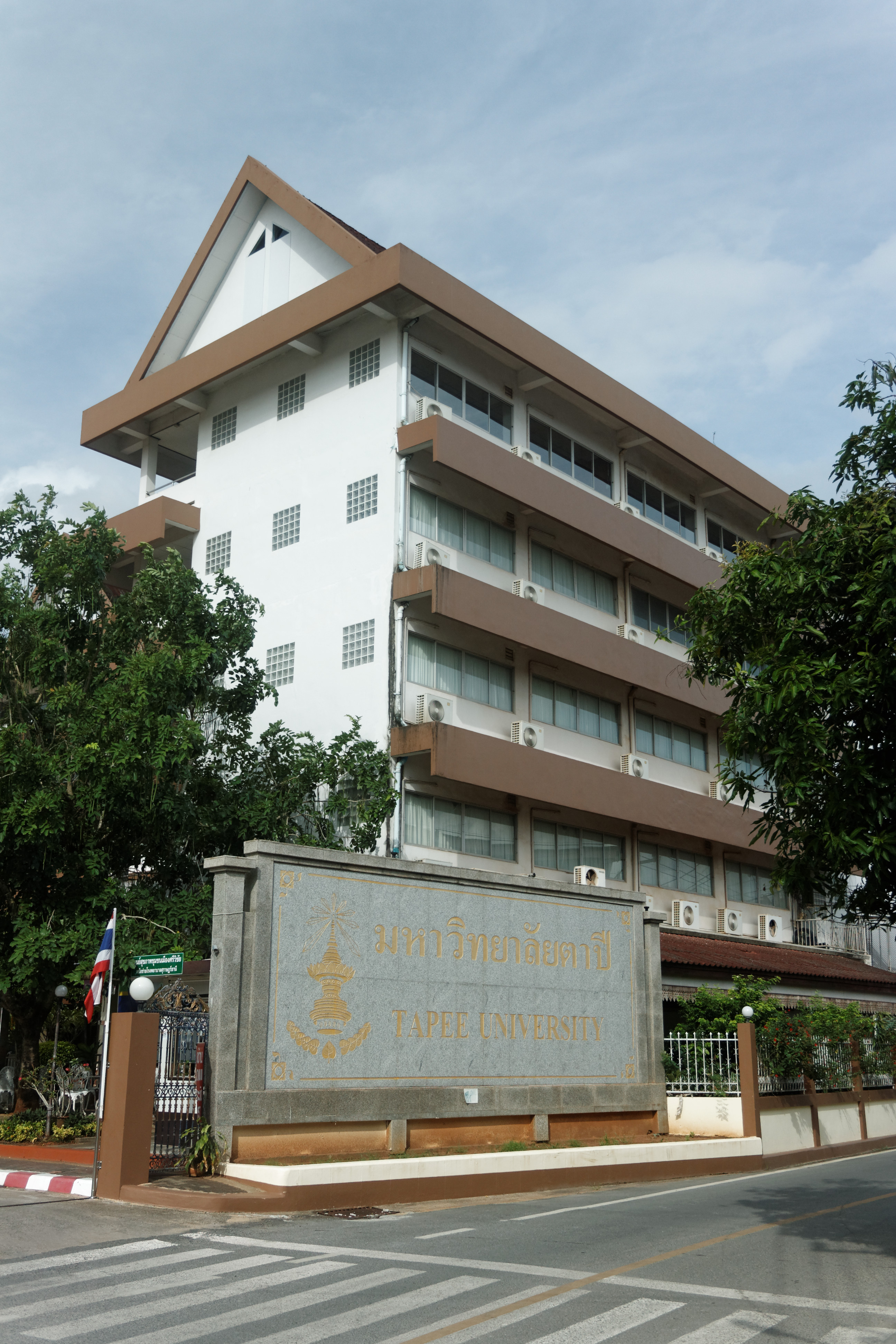
Tapes College

The college has five faculties:

- Faculty of Science and Technology
- Faculty of Business Administration
- Faculty of Accountancy
- Faculty of Law
- Faculty of Liberal Arts

== See also ==
- List of universities in Thailand
