= San Yu Adventist School =

San Yu Adventist School 三育中小学 Sānyù Zhōngxiǎoxué

Location
- 299 Thomson Road; 307652; Singapore; 1.3221°N 103.8388°E

Information
- School type: Private
- Motto: Thy Word is Truth
- Denomination: Seventh-day Adventist Church
- Established: 1907 (Seventh-Day Adventist School); 1958 (San Yu High School)
- Principal: Thomas Ang
- Faculty: 24 full-time 1 part-time
- Grades: P1-S4
- Gender: Coeducational
- Age: 7 (P1) to 16/17 (S4/5)
- Enrolment: 600+
- Campus: Urban
- Accreditation: AAA; CPE (EduTrust)
- Yearbook: Morning Glory
- Website: www.syas.edu.sg

San Yu Adventist School (SYAS) is a private Christian school in Singapore which caters to students from ages 7 (Primary 1) to 16/17 (Secondary 4, GCE 'O' Levels). It follows the local education system and is fully owned and operated by the Singapore Adventist Conference. The current school was a result of the merger of two Adventist schools: the English-medium Seventh-day Adventist School previously located in Upper Serangoon Road and the Chinese-medium San Yu High School.

It is a part of the Seventh-day Adventist education system, the world's second largest Christian school system.

== History ==
The present-day San Yu Adventist School in Singapore is the result of a merger between two schools: the Seventh-day Adventist School and San Yu High School. The histories of these two educational institutions are closely linked to the development of the Seventh-day Adventist Church in Singapore.

SYAS has a long history of welcoming students from other countries and continues to have a diverse student population. In the past students were mainly from ASEAN countries. Since the merger, non-ASEAN countries represented over the years include China, Japan, South Korea, India, Myanmar, Russia, Trinidad and Tobago, Portugal and Australia.

=== Seventh-day Adventist School ===
Seventh-day Adventist School (SDAS) traces its origins to the "Eastern Training School" founded in 1907 by the former Malaya Mission (which encompassed the former British Malaya). It was originally located on Mount Pleasant Road near Dhoby Ghaut. It moved to Serangoon and then renamed Singapore Training School not long after. In 1916, it moved to 273 Upper Serangoon Road not far from the current Woodleigh MRT station. During the Japanese Occupation the school was closed as were many other fellow Christian schools and institutions and reopened after the Japanese surrendered and left the island. After the war the primary and secondary section opened to its first students. In 1952 the school was renamed "Southeast Asia Union College" (SAUC). Due to government regulations, the primary and secondary section was split from the college and named "Seventh-day Adventist School" but remained on the same campus as the college. SDAS mainly catered to local students or children of college faculty and staff as it used the local curriculum (English medium) while expatriate missionary children attended Far Eastern Academy (FEA). The compound along Upper Serangoon was a hub for the Seventh-day Adventist Church in Singapore as the Southeast Asia Union Mission headquarters and neighboring Youngberg Adventist Hospital were located there, in addition to SAUC and SDAS.

FEA was founded in 1926 in Shanghai before war and political instability forced it to relocate to various places, finally setting in Singapore when World War II ended. Located at 800 Thomson Road, it used the North American curriculum and catered to the missionary community, most of whom were from North America, in Southeast Asia. It was closed in the 1980s and most of the land was sold to be developed into a condominium. The remaining land owned by the church was redesignated 798 Thomson Road and is home to the SAUM headquarters.

=== San Yu High School ===
San Yu High School (三育中学) was founded at the current Thomson Road premises by the West Malaysia-Singapore Mission in 1958. It was a Chinese medium school founded with 167 students and seven teachers. In 1962 the Seventh-day Adventist Chinese Church located next to the school took over operations. For a period it offered both "O" and "A" Levels. Pre-university courses (A Levels) were discontinued in 1995 in line with the government's policy of centralising A Level education at junior colleges.

=== Merger ===
In 1996, backed by the MOE, the church voted for a merger of SDAS and San Yu High. The government had notified the church that the area along Upper Serangoon Road near Potong Pasir, which includes the church-owned compound and Bidadari Cemetery across the road, was to be acquired for the building of the North East MRT line and for redevelopment. In 1997 the schools were merged and renamed "San Yu Adventist School" and the former San Yu High's existing campus at Thomson Road was renovated to prepare for the increase in students, a result of the merger. While the Thomson Road campus was being renovated, staff and students from the former San Yu High moved to Upper Serangoon Road. By 1999 compound at Upper Serangoon closed for good as SAUC graduated its last batch of students, SYAS moved to its newly renovated campus and the SAUM headquarters moved to 798 Thomson Road.

The former site at Upper Serangoon Road is now occupied by condominiums and Stamford American International School while SAUC's assets were transferred to Mission College (now Asia-Pacific International University) in Thailand and other remaining property was moved to Thomson Road campus.

== See also ==
- List of Seventh-day Adventist secondary and elementary schools
- Seventh-day Adventist education
- Seventh-day Adventist Church
- Seventh-day Adventist theology
- History of the Seventh-day Adventist Church
