= Thongsuk College =

Coordinates: 13°47′4.07″N 100°23′55.36″E

Thongsook College (Thai: วิทยาลัยทองสุข) is a private higher education institute located in Boromratchonni Road, Thawi Watthana District, Bangkok, Thailand. Established in 1994, the college offers several undergraduate programs and a Thai master's degree program in business administration. They also provide a student managed Teaching English to Speakers of Other Languages (BA TESOL) program.

OHEC inspections of the institutions last September and October determined that some courses had too few lecturers, while others had too many students enrolled, beyond the numbers officially reported to the OHEC. OHEC deputy chief Supat Champathong said after a commission meeting on Wednesday that it was decided to reveal the schools’ names to inform the public of issues pertaining to educational quality.

Bangkok-based Thongsook College (three on campus and 11 off-campus),

Supat said the issues related to these courses such as lecturers and student numbers could be solved by the concerned universities, warning them to cooperate with OHEC to tackle these issues in the interests of students.

60 former Thongsook BA TESOL students have filed complaints to the government OCP (Office of Consumer Protection) regarding unpaid refunds and poor student record management

The college has hosted world title boxing match between Thai holder Chatchai Sasakul vs. future superstar Manny Pacquiao from the Philippines on December 4, 1998. As a result, Sasakul lost by knockout in the eighth round. Pacquiao won his first world title.

== Thai Language Programs ==
=== Undergraduate ===
FACULTY	PROGRAM	DEGREE	ACADEMIC	LENGTH OF STUDY
Faculty of Accounting			Thai Calendar (Two Semester)	4 years (Can be completed in 3)
Faculty of Public Health			Thai Calendar (Two Semester)	4 years (Can be completed in 3)
Faculty of Business Administration			Thai Calendar (Two Semester)	4 years (Can be completed in 3)

=== Graduate ===
FACULTY	PROGRAM	DEGREE	ACADEMIC CALENDAR	LENGTH OF STUDY
Faculty of Education		M.Ed	Thai Calendar	
Faculty of Law				

== English Language Programs ==
=== Undergraduate ===
PROGRAM	DEGREE	ACADEMIC CALENDAR	LENGTH OF STUDY	CREDITS REQUIRED FOR GRADUATION
Teaching English to Speakers of Other Languages	BA TESOL	ASEAN Calendar Trimester	4 Years (can be completed in three)	120
Bachelor of Business Administration (Management)	BBA	ASEAN Calendar Trimester	4 Years (can be completed in three)	120
Quality Education Program			4 months	

== Notable alumni ==
- Parkpoom Jangphonak 1998 Asian Games gold medalist boxer
- Worapoj Petchkoom 2004 Summer Olympics silver medalist boxer
- Sudaporn Seesondee 2020 Summer Olympics bronze medalist female boxer
- Nattacha Boonchaiinsawat Member of Parliament for Bangkok

== See also ==
- List of universities in Thailand
- Education in Thailand
- International Standard Classification of Education
