= Bangkok School of Management =

Educational institution in Thailand

Coordinates: 13.743632°N 100.541389°E

Bangkok School of Management (BSM) is an educational institution in Thailand, established in 1998, which offers courses in business and management. It is located on the 16th floor of the Amarin Plaza in the Ratchaprasong area of Bangkok.
