= Vongchavalitkul University =

Thai private university in Nakhon Ratchasima

Coordinates: 15.002435°N 102.117594°E

Vongchavalitkul University (VU) (Thai: มหาวิทยาลัยวงษ์ชวลิตกุล) is a private university in Nakhon Ratchasima Province, Thailand. Founded in 1984 as Vongchavalitkul College, it was upgraded to university status in 1994. Currently the university offers 26 undergraduate degree programs, five master's degree programs, and four doctoral degree programs.

== See also ==
- List of universities in Thailand
