= Hatyai University =

Private university

Coordinates: 6.980980°N 100.465440°E

- มหาวิทยาลัยหาดใหญ่
- Former name: Hatyai City College
- Type: Private university
- Established: 1997
- President: Asst. Prof. Dr. Wittawat Didyasarin Sattayarak
- Administrative staff: 350
- Students: 5,000
- Location: Hat Yai, Songkhla, Thailand
- Campus: Hat Yai
- Colours: Red, White, Blue
- Nickname: HU
- Website: www.hu.ac.th

Hatyai University (Thai: มหาวิทยาลัยหาดใหญ่) is a private university in Hat Yai, Songkhla Province, Thailand. Founded in 1997, the university offers undergraduate programs through its seven faculties: business administration, law, education and liberal arts, science and technology, political science, communication arts, and Didyasarin International College. Its graduate school offers in education administration, business administration programs, and doctoral programs.

== History ==
Hatyai University was the first private university in southern Thailand. It was previously named Hatyai City College and was established on 9 April 1997 by Madam Praneet Didyasarin, the founder and the licensee of Hatyai Amnuaywit School Group. The Ministry of University Education Affairs promoted Hatyai City College to university status on 30 May 2003. "Hat Yai University". Study in Thailand.org. August 23, 2018.

Hatyai University first became a college on 9 April 1997. with the inaugural ceremony held on 20 April 1999. On 4 June 2003, it became a university. The institutional status was officially changed from Hatyai City College to Hatyai University.

=== 1997 ===
- Establishment of Hatyai City College and the first faculty was Faculty of Business Management offered one curriculum, Bachelor of Business Administration (BBA.) (four year program) in three fields: management, accounting, and marketing.
- There were 182 students
- The first strategic plan for university development was set up for 1997–2001

=== 1998 ===
- Faculty of Business Management offered a two-year program with one curriculum: Bachelor of Business Administration (BBA) in three fields: management, accounting, and marketing.
- 847 students (increased 665 students from 1997).

=== 1999 ===
- Official Foundation Ceremony of Hatyai City College was conducted on 20 February 1999 by the former Prime Minister, Mr. Chuan Leekpai.
- The Faculty of Business Management offered two fields (two and four year programs): Business Computer and Human Resources Management.
- 1,808 students (increased 961 students from 1998).

=== 2000 ===
- The Faculty of Law was founded to offer the a curriculum, Bachelor of Laws (LLB.)
- HU first graduation ceremony was held for students who graduated from the Continuing program in the Faculty of Business Management.
- 2,417 students (increased 609 students from 1999).

=== 2001 ===
- The Faculty of Liberal Arts was founded to offer the new curriculum: Bachelor of Arts (BA) in Business English program (four year program).
- The Graduate School was founded to offer a new curriculum, Master of Education (MEd) in one field, educational administration.
- 3,205 students (increased 788 students from 2000).
- Memorandum of Understanding Signing Ceremony was conducted between Universiti Utara Malaysia and Hatyai University.
- Official Signing Agreement of Establishment of Authorized Sun Education Center (ASEC) was conducted between Microsystems and Hatyai University. It is the first center in southern Thailand for producing Java programmers.
- Implementation plan of the quality assurance was set up.
- Implementation plan of the university development was set up for the second period (2002–2007).

=== 2002 ===
- Faculty of Science and Technology was founded to offer the new curriculum; Bachelor of Science (B.Sc.) (four year program) in one field, information technology.
- 3,651 students (increased 446 students from 2001).
- Joint hosted with the National Education Committee and Universiti Utara Malaysia for the International Conference on the Challenge of Learning and Teaching in a Brave New World (CoLT 2002). Over 200 administrators and academic officers from 22 countries participated in the conference.

=== 2003 ===
- Hatyai City College became Hatyai University.
- 4,138 students (increased 487 students from 2002).

== HU identity ==
HU's emblem is the shield with the title of HU underneath and a torch on top. Inside the shield, are a Ma Hat Tree, book, and the wheel of life.

== Programs ==
=== Bachelor's Degrees ===
Two and four year programs in

- Management
- Marketing
- Business Computer
- Human Resource Management
- Service Industries
- Retail and Franchise Business Management
- Accounting
- Law
- Thai for Business Communication
- Education in Thai (five year program)
- Education in Social Studies (five year program)
- Art and Design
- Pop Music (five year program)
- Society Development
- Information Technology
- Geo-informatics
- Public Health Program in Community Public Health (BPH)
- Politics and Government
- Public Administration
- Local Government
- International Relations
- Communication Arts
- Digital Media

=== International Program ===
- Bachelor of Education in English (five year International Program)
- Bachelor of Business Administration in International Business Management
- Bachelor of Arts in Business Chinese (Bilingual Program)
- Bachelor of Arts in Tourism Industry (Airline Business) (Bilingual Program)

=== Master's degrees ===
- M.Ed. (Curriculum and Instruction) Master of Education Program in Curriculum and Instruction
- M.Ed. (Educational Administration) Master of Education Program in Educational Administration
- M.P.A. Master of Public Administration Program in Public and Private Management
- Master of Business Administration Program
- Graduate Diploma in Teaching Profession Program

=== Doctoral degrees ===
- Doctor of Philosophy in Business Administration
- Doctor of Education in Educational Administration

== Facilities ==
- Interactive Digital Classroom
- Computer center and internet center
- Library with multimedia services
- Laboratory
- Mock court
- Sound lab
- Student Union
- Geo-Informatics Laboratory
- Classical music chamber
- Sport Center and Student Union
- U Studio / U Radio 101.25 MHz
- Prayer room
- Multimedia Production Lab
- MOS and Prometric Testing Center
- Student One-Stop Service (SOS)
- Shuttle service and car service
- Post office
- Mock Up cabin crew

== Student services ==
- Scholarships for athletes, academic abilities, extraordinary contributions
- Government student loans
- Work-exchange scholarships
- The Madam Praneet Didyasarin Scholarships for foreign students
- Counseling service and job-seeking service
- Personal insurance (accident)
- Off-campus dormitory services
- Health center

== Academic collaboration ==
=== Thailand ===
- Central Retail
- CPF Trading
- Thailand Convention & Exhibition Bureau
- Darunsartwittaya School
- Assumption University

== International collaboration ==
=== Malaysia ===
- ADAM College
- Equator Academy of Art
- HELP University
- Erican College
- Limkokwing University
- Universiti Utara Malaysia (UUM)
- Universiti Sains Malaysia (USM)
- Universiti Teknologi MARA (UiTM)
- Universiti Malaysia Perlis (UniMAP)

=== China ===
- Beijing Geely University
- Guangxi Normal University
- Henan Normal University
- Liuzhou City Vocational College
- University of Sanya
- Yunnan University
- Yunnan College of Foreign Affairs and Foreign Languages
- Yunnan Normal University

=== Indonesia ===
- Akademi Manajemen Administrasi Yogyakarta
- Akademi Manajemen Administrasi YPK
- Akademi Keperawatan 17 Karanganyar Surakarta
- Ahmad Dahlan University
- Duta Wacana Christian University
- Perkumpulan Ahli Dan Dosen Republik Indonesia (ADRI)
- Universitas Kuningan
- Universitas Muria Kudus (UMK)
- Universitas Maarif Hasyim Latif
- Universitas Pancasakti Tegal
- Universitas PGRI Madiun
- Sekolah Tinggi Ilmu Ekonomi (STIE) Atama Bhakti
- Sekolah Tinggi Ilmu Ekonomi (STIE) Totalwin
- Sekolah Tinggi Ilmu Kesehatan (STIKES) Kendal
- Sekolah Tinggi Ilmu Ekonomi (STIE) YPK

== See also ==
- List of universities in Thailand
