= Kasem Bundit University =

Private university in Thailand

Coordinates: 13°44′17″N 100°37′37″E

Kasem Bundit University (KBU)
- Motto: Value Virtue Worthiness
- Type: Private
- Established: 1987
- Location: 1761 Pattanakarn Rd., Suan Luang, Bangkok, Thailand
- Campus: 2
- Nickname: KBU
- Website: http://www.kbu.ac.th

Kasem Bundit University (KBU) is a private university in Thailand. Established in 1987, it offers academic programs at graduate and undergraduate levels.

Among its institutes are the Institute of Digital Media Law at Kasem Bundit University. The school has been hired by the Bangkok Metropolitan Administration to perform joint research. The university's journal was started in 1999, while the university was started in 1993 out of Kasem Bundit College.

== History ==
Founded in 1987 by Kasem Suwandee, "Kasem Bundit College" consisted of two faculties in its first year — Business Administration and Law. In 1992, Kasem Bundit College was granted permission to become "Kasem Bundit University" by the Office of the Higher Education Commission (Ministry of University Affairs). It added more faculties and began offering a Master of Business Administration (M.B.A.). The university offers Doctor of Philosophy in Psychology in 2006, Doctor of Philosophy in Public Policy and Management, Master of Business Administration (International Program), Bachelor of Liberal Arts in Thai for Foreigners, Bachelor of Liberal Arts in Psychology and, with concentration on good health, Bachelor of Sports Management and Recreation Science in 2009.

== International collaboration ==
Kasem Bundit University collaborates with Kansas State University, Arkansas State University, Washburn University in the US and Kent Institute Australia, in Sydney, Australia on an academic project on Bachelor of Business Administration (B.B.A.) (English program).

The university, in addition, signed MOU for cooperation in curriculum development with many international top universities. One can study architectural design with University of Applied Sciences Neubrandenburg, Germany. The school collaborates with Chinese universities such as Yunnan National University, Kunming University of Science and Technology, Oxbridge College, Chuxiong Normal University, Lincang Teachers’ College, etc., cooperating in educational, lingual and cultural exchanges for students. The university encourages studies of foreign languages.

== International programs ==
=== Undergraduate programs ===
==== Bachelor of BusinessAdministration (B.B.A.) ====
- Majors offered
1. Marketing
2. Management
3. Business Computer

==== Bachelor of Arts in English for Communication (B.A.) ====
Besides the four-year curriculum, the B.A. program offers students opportunities in gaining more educational experience:

1. Cooperative Education: Gaining real-world experience at international schools, international companies or international banks
2. Availability of Business-Related Minors:
- Teaching English as a Foreign Language (TEFL)
- Business Administration (majors of the B.B.A. International Program):
1. Marketing
2. Management
3. Business Computer

==== Bachelor of Arts in Tourism (B.A.) Graduate Program ====
The International Program in Tourism offers a four-year bachelor's degree.

=== Graduate programs ===
==== Master of Business Administration (M.B.A.) ====
Programs offered:

- Finance
- Marketing
- Management
- Managing Information System

== See also ==
- List of universities in Thailand
