= Sripatum University =

University in Thailand

- มหาวิทยาลัยศรีปทุม
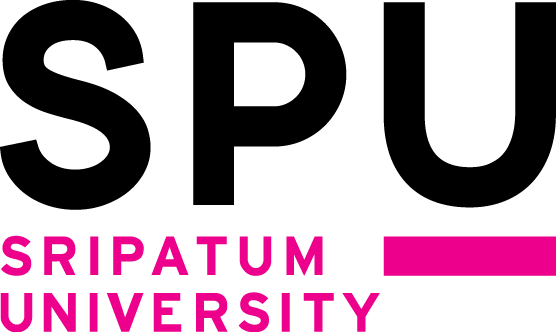
- Former name: Thai Suriya College
- Type: Private
- Established: 1970
- President: Dr.Rutchaneeporn Pookayaporn Phukkamarn
- Location: 2410/2 Phahonyothin Road, Chatuchak, Bangkok, Thailand; 13°51′19″N 100°35′07″E
- Campus: Bangkhen Main Campus in Bangkok, Phyathai Campus for Executive Programs located in CBD area, Chonburi Campus near the country’s eastern seaboard, Khon Kaen - Gateway to ASEAN
- Nickname: SPU
- Website: https://www.spu.ac.th/

Sripatum University (SPU; Thai: มหาวิทยาลัยศรีปทุม) is one of the oldest private universities in Bangkok, Thailand. Dr. Sook Pookayaporn established the university in 1970 under the name of Thai Suriya College. In 1987, the college was promoted to university status by the Ministry of University Affairs, and has since been known as Sripatum University.

"Sripatum" means the "Source of Knowledge Blooming Like a Lotus" and was conferred on the college by the Princess Mother Srinagarindra (Somdet Phra Srinagarindra Baromarajajanan). She presided over the official opening ceremony of SPU and awarded vocational certificates to the first three graduating classes.

In 2002, Sripatum University was accredited by the International Organization for Standardization (ISO9001:2000) for both undergraduate and graduate programs. Sripatum University offers 10 Schools & 6 Colleges . According to UniRank, the university enrolls approximately 20,000 to 24,999 students across all campuses as of 2024.

SIC offers 8 international academic programs taught in English: International Business Management, International Hospitality Management (a joint academic program with SHML in Switzerland), International Logistic & Supply Chain Management, Airline Business, Media & Marketing Communication, Accountancy, Business Chinese (a dual-degree with Beijing Language and Culture University) and Thai Studies.

== History ==
Sook Pookayaporn founded Sripatum College on 28 May 1970, making it one of the earliest private higher education institutions in Thailand.

The college received royal recognition when Princess Mother Srinagarindra bestowed the name ‘‘Sripatum’’, meaning “a source of knowledge that blooms like a lotus flower.” She presided over the opening ceremony and presented certificates to graduates of the first three cohorts.

On 6 November 1987, the institution was formally elevated to university status under the Thai Ministry of University Affairs. In the same year, the university established its Chonburi Campus to serve students in the Eastern Region. In 2013, the Khon Kaen Campus was opened to extend educational services to northeastern Thailand.

In 2002, SPU became one of the few private universities in Thailand to earn ISO 9001:2000 certification across both undergraduate and graduate programs. Since its founding, the university has produced more than 120,000 graduates and currently enrolls more than 25,000 students across its campuses.

== Campus ==
=== Main campus ===
The main campus is situated at 2410/2 Phahonyothin Road in Chatuchak District, Bangkok, accessible by public transportation including the BTS Skytrain at Mo Chit station. The campus houses academic buildings for each school and college, a central library, computer laboratories, sports facilities, and a student activity center.

=== Regional campuses ===
- Chonburi Campus — serving students in the Eastern Economic Corridor region.
- Khon Kaen Campus — serving students in northeastern Thailand.

== Academics ==
Sripatum University is organized into 10 Schools and 6 Colleges, offering undergraduate, graduate, and doctoral programs across a wide range of disciplines. Academic units include the School of Business Administration, School of Law, School of Engineering, School of Liberal Arts, School of Accountancy, School of Information Technology, School of Communication Arts, School of Digital Media, School of Design and Architecture, School of Entrepreneurship, College of Logistics and Supply Chain, College of Tourism and Hospitality, and the Graduate School.

=== International programs ===
The Sripatum University International College (SPUIC) offers eight international academic programs taught entirely in English: International Business Management, International Hospitality Management, International Logistics and Supply Chain Management, Airline Business, Media and Marketing Communication, Accountancy, Business Chinese, and Thai Studies.

=== College of Tourism and Hospitality ===
The College of Tourism and Hospitality has signed memoranda of understanding with airlines including Thai Airways International and Nok Air, as well as cruise lines and the Thai Hotels Association, providing students with mandatory internship placements prior to graduation.

=== Digital Media and E-Sports ===
Sripatum University is among the first universities in Thailand to offer a dedicated programme in game and e-sports education through its School of Digital Media, which enrolled approximately 600 e-sports students as of 2019. The school offers programmes in game design, animation, and e-sports.

== Symbols ==
The university's official emblem features a blooming pink lotus enclosed within a hexagon. The lotus petals represent wisdom, professional skill, and joy, while the hexagon symbolizes virtue and community. The official colors are Blue and Pink. The university flower is the Pink Royal Lotus, and the university tree is the Royal Palm.

== Research ==
Sripatum University supports applied research relevant to Thai industry and society. Faculty research has been published in journals indexed in the Thai-Journal Citation Index (TCI). In 2019, the university partnered with Kasikornbank to establish the SPU Digital Campus initiative.

The university has also collaborated with RevisionSuccess Co., Ltd., led by CEO Phonlawat Sirajindapirom, to advance artificial intelligence in Thai higher education.

SPU has also partnered with the Digital Economy Promotion Agency (Depa) on cybersecurity training initiatives. In 2024, the university joined the Disrupt Health Impact Fund as a co-investment partner alongside Digital Health Ventures and other Thai firms to support health technology startups in Thailand.

=== Academic journals ===
The university publishes the Sripatum Review of Humanities and Social Sciences, a peer-reviewed journal indexed in the Thai-Journal Citation Index (TCI).

== See also ==
- Higher education in Thailand
- List of universities in Thailand
- Private university
