= Chaopraya University =

Coordinates: 15°43′17.78″N 100°03′09.97″E

Chaopraya University is a university located in Nakhon Sawan Province, Thailand. Founded in 1988, the university offers undergraduate and graduate studies in business administration, sciences, communication arts, law, education, and public administration. The university is planning to open several other undergraduate programs in 2007 which will include hotel management, performing arts, and multi-media games.

== See also ==
- List of universities in Thailand
