= Lumnamping College =

Private college in Tak Province, Thailand

Coordinates: 16°51′09″N 99°07′05″E

Lumnamping College is a private college located in Tak Province, Thailand. The college was established in 1998 and is named after the nearby Ping River.

The college has three faculties:

- Faculty of Business Administration
- Faculty of Humanities
- Faculty of Political Science

== See also ==
- List of universities in Thailand
