= Payap University =

Private institution

- มหาวิทยาลัยพายัพ
- Motto: สัจจะ-บริการ
- Motto in English: Truth - Service
- Type: Private
- Established: March 21, 1974
- Affiliations: APHEIT; ACUCA; ASAIHL
- Religious affiliation: Foundation of the Church of Christ in Thailand
- President: Mr. Apicha Insuwan (Interim)
- Location: Chiang Mai, Thailand; 18.794979°N 99.032711°E
- Colors: Sky Blue and White
- Website: www.payap.ac.th

Payap University (Thai: มหาวิทยาลัยพายัพ; RTGS: Mh̄āwithyālạy phāyạph), established in 1974, is a private and non-profit institution founded by the Foundation of the Church of Christ in Thailand. Payap University is a liberal arts and pre-professional school offering a doctoral degree in peacebuilding, master's degrees in divinity, linguistics, TESOL, law, business administration and music, and bachelor degrees in communication arts, information technology, accountancy, business administration, economics, nursing, law, and Christian theology. Payap University is a founding member of the Association of Private Higher Education Institutions of Thailand and an active member of the Association of Christian Universities and Colleges in Asia, as well as the Association of Southeast Asian Institutions of Higher Learning.

== Academic programs ==
Payap University is a liberal arts and pre-professional school offering 21 Thai language degrees and 7 English-based language International degree programs in 12 colleges/faculties.

== International College ==
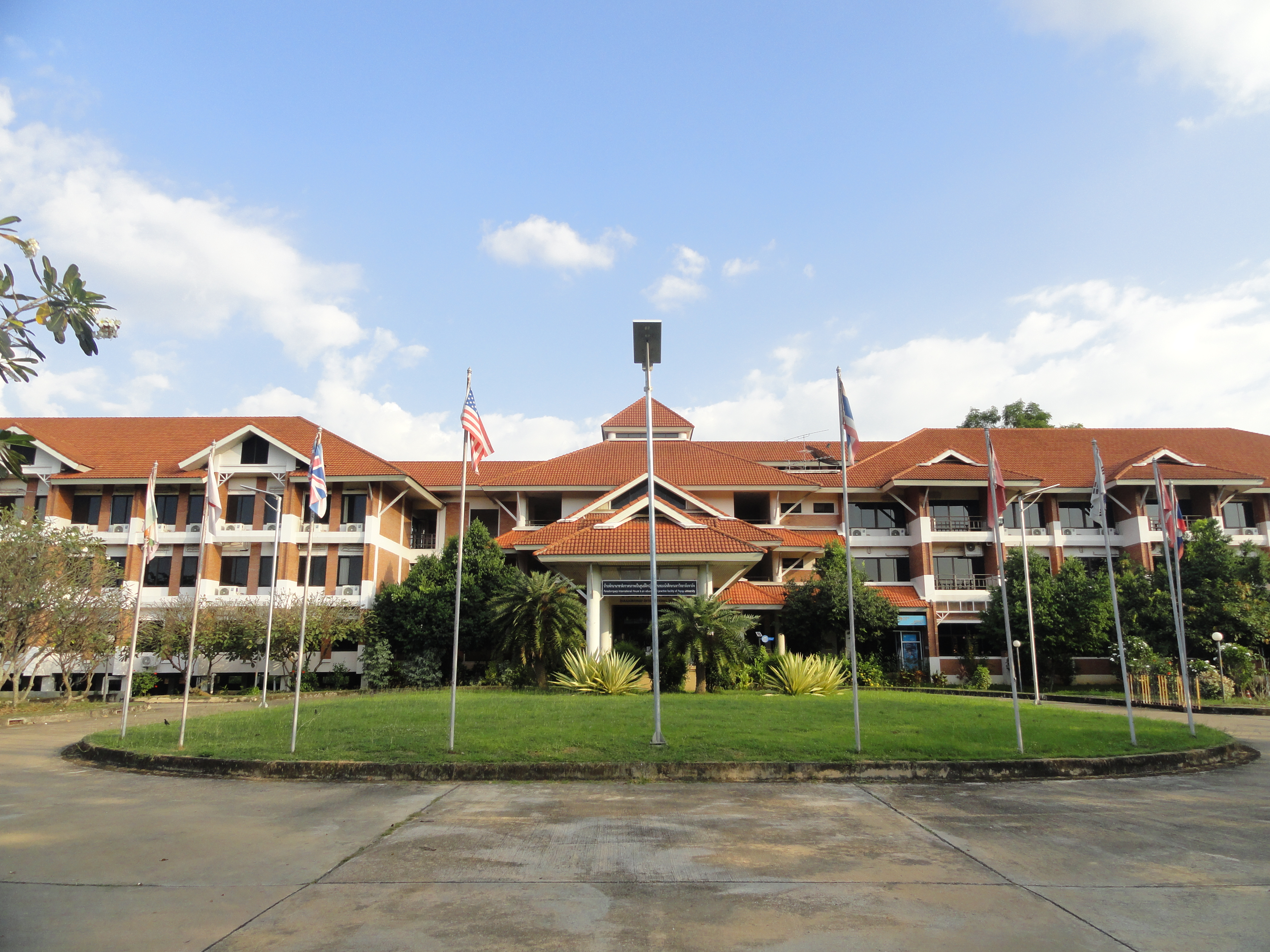
Paradornparp International House, Mae Khao campus

At its International College (IC), Payap University has an international student body with nearly 30 countries represented, including the United States, China, Myanmar, France, Germany, Mexico, Japan, Pakistan, India and Thailand. Students share strong English proficiency to perform in the English-speaking bachelor's and master's degree programs. Students of the IC also have their own student union, the International College Student Union (ICSU).

The IC is a faculty-level college of Payap University and is home to four undergraduate departments and three graduate-level programs. Undergraduate programs include BBA programs in International Business Management (IBM) and Hospitality Industry Management (HIM), a BA program in English Communication (EC) and a BSc program in Information Technology (IT). Graduate programs include the MA in Linguistics, MA in TESOL and the PhD in Peacebuilding housed at the university's Institute of Religion, Culture and Peace (IRCP).

Payap University has obtained official recognition from the United States government, through its Department of Education (DOE), as eligible for federal financial aid.

== Location ==
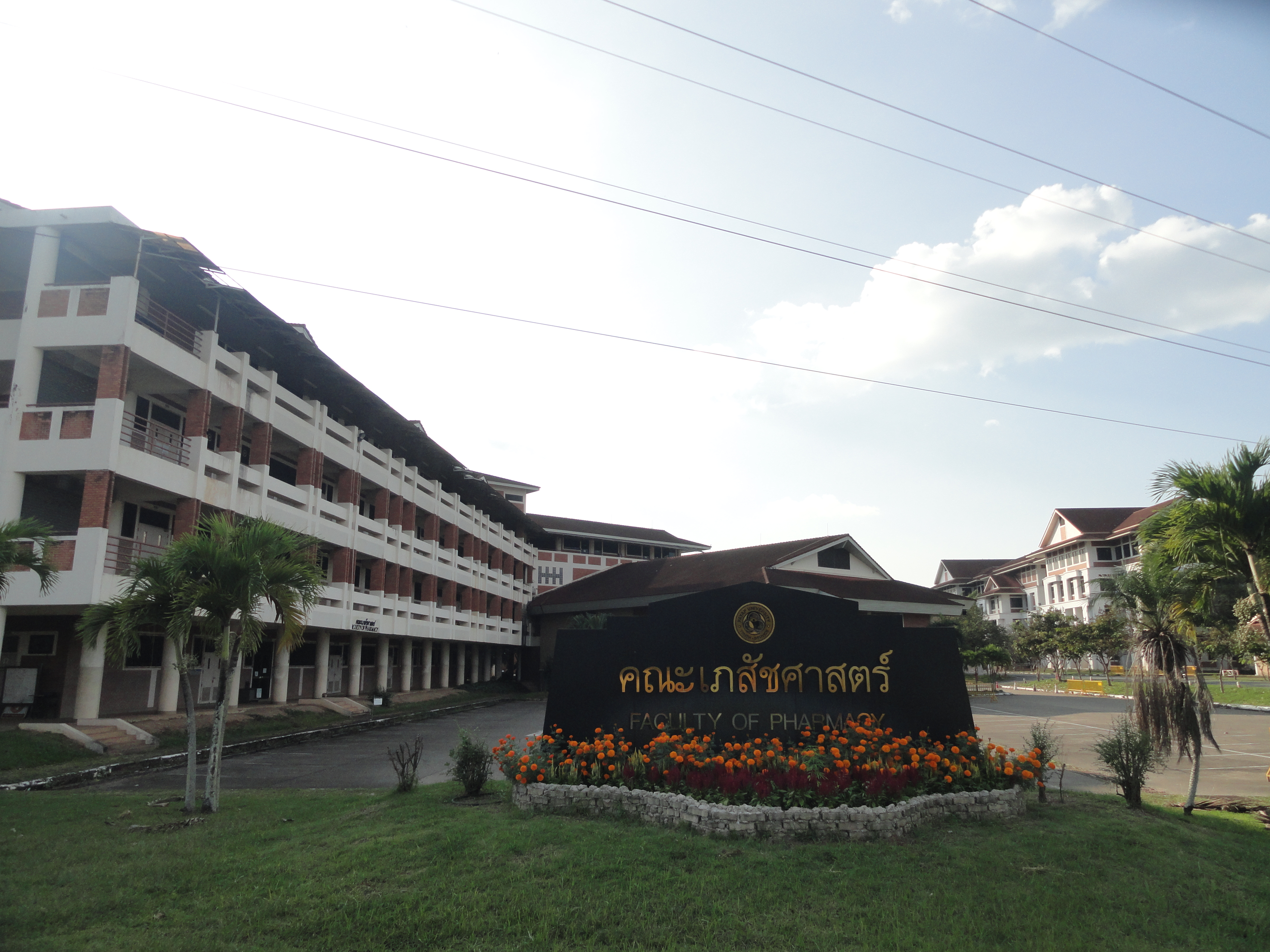
Mae Khao campus

The university is in Chiang Mai, Thailand.

=== Mae Khao campus ===
Just east of the city, on the "middle" ring road, Mae Khao is the larger campus with 120 acres housing classrooms, administrative offices, and laboratories. The Luce Chapel, Center for Arts and Culture, the Research and Development Institute, and the University Central Library are here, as well as the faculties of humanities and social science, business administration, science, law, accountancy, finance and banking, communication art, pharmacy, and the graduate school. Also here are the university archives, the Christian Communication Institute (CCI), the Linguistics Institute, and the Institute for the Study of Religion, Culture and Peace.

=== Kaew Nawarat campus ===
Kaew Nawarat is a small campus in town, across from Payap-affiliated McCormick Hospital. The McGilvary College of Divinity, the McCormick Faculty of Nursing, and the College of Music are here.

== Archives ==
The Payap University Archives hold documents related to the history of Protestant missions in northern Thailand. They house the personal papers of many missionaries from the 19th and 20th centuries, and the institutional archives of several missionary organizations.
