= Pathumthani University =

Coordinates: 14.013950°N 100.549135°E

Pathumthani University (Thai: มหาวิทยาลัยปทุมธานี) is a university in Pathum Thani, Thailand. Founded as Pathumthani College in 1999, it was upgraded to university status in 2005. The university is organized into seven faculties and a graduate school.

== See also ==
- List of universities in Thailand
