= International Buddhist College =

Buddhist institution of higher education

Coordinates: 6.782791°N 100.395857°E

- วิทยาลัยพุทธศาสนานานาชาติ
- Motto: Bahunam Vata Atthaya
- Motto in English: For the Good of the Many
- Type: Private
- Established: 2005
- Affiliations: Buddhist
- Rector: Dr. Charles Willemen
- Location: Songkhla, Thailand
- Website: https://www.ibc.ac.th

International Buddhist College (IBC) (Thai: วิทยาลัยพุทธศาสนานานาชาติ) is an inter-sectarian Buddhist higher education institute in Sadao District, Songkhla Province, Thailand.

Described by The Chronicle of Higher Education as a "rare combination of secular academics and monastic life," the International Buddhist College currently offers three B.A. programs: Buddhist philosophy, Buddhist historical and cultural studies, and Pali and Sanskrit languages and literature to both laypersons and monastic students from all three of the major traditions of Buddhism: Theravada, Mahayana, and Vajrayana. At the post-graduate level, it has certificate, M.A., and Ph.D. programs in Buddhist studies and an M.A. in early childhood education. Some programs are available via distance learning At all levels of instruction, classes are offered in both English and Chinese.

The International Buddhist College is a member of a global network of Buddhist Studies programs that includes the University of Hong Kong, the University of British Columbia, the University of Toronto, and Stanford University, and is supported in part by The Robert H. N. Ho Family Foundation.

== Notable faculty members ==
- Kapila Abhayawansa
