= North Chiang Mai University =

Private university in Chiang Mai, Thailand

Coordinates: 18.662352°N 98.919178°E

North Chiang Mai University (NCU) (Thai: มหาวิทยาลัยนอร์ท-เชียงใหม่) is a private university in Chiang Mai, Chiang Mai Province, Thailand founded in 1999.
