= Thai-Nichi Institute of Technology =

Private college in Bangkok, Thailand

Coordinates: 13.73818°N 100.62822°E

- สถาบันเทคโนโลยีไทย-ญี่ปุ่น 泰日工業大学
- Other names: TNI
- Type: Private Institute
- Established: 29 September 2007
- Location: 1771/1, Pattanakarn Road, Suan Luang, Bangkok, Thailand
- Colours: Blue and Red
- Website: www.tni.ac.th

Thai-Nichi Institute of Technology (TNI) is an industry-oriented private college located in Bangkok, Thailand. The college was established in 2006 by the Technology Promotion Association (Thailand-Japan). It was founded with the cooperation of Thai and Japanese organizations.

The main distinction of all of its curriculum is the inclusion of a half-year long internship in industry (cooperative program), especially in a Japanese company, and also mandatory Japanese and English language courses every semester.

The first enrollment in 2007 was approximately 300 students. In 2008, there were about 900 students. Many of the students received scholarships from Thai-Japanese organizations, Japanese companies and the Japan Chamber of Commerce (JCC).

== Undergraduate courses ==
Faculty of Engineering

- Bachelor of Engineering
1. Department of Automotive Engineering (AE)
2. Department of Production Engineering (PE)
3. Department of Computer Engineering (CE)
4. Department of Industrial Engineering (IE)
5. Department of Electrical Engineering (EE)
6. Department of Digital Engineering (DGE) <International Programme>

Faculty of Information Technology

- Bachelor of Science
1. Department of Information Technology (IT)
2. Department of Multimedia Technology (MT)
3. Department of Business Information System (BI)
4. Department of Digital Technology in Mass Communication (DC)
5. Department of Data Science and Analytics (DSA) <International Programme>

Faculty of Business Administration

- Bachelor of Business Administration
1. Department of Business Japanese Administration (BJ)
2. Department of International Business Management (IB)
3. Department of Industrial Management (IM)
4. Department of Accountancy (AC)
5. Department of Japanese Human Resources (HR)
6. Department of Creative Marketing (CM)
7. Department of Logistics and Supply Chain Management (LM)

== Graduate courses ==
1. Master of Engineering (Engineering Technology) M.ET.
2. Master of Science (Information Technology) M.IT.
3. Master of Business Administration on Industrial Management
4. Master of Business Administration on Strategic Planning and Management for Entrepreneur
5. Master of Business Administration on Japanese Business Administration

== Interchange ==
Japan

- Chiba Institute of Technology
- Daido University
- Institute of Technology
- Kyushu University
- Nagoya Institute of Technology
- Osaka Institute of Technology
- Shibaura Institute of Technology
- Tokai University
- Tokyo University of Agriculture and Technology
- Tohoku University
- Tohoku Institute of Technology
- Toyoda Institute of Technology, etc.

== See also ==
- Federation of Thai Industries (Thailand)
- Ministry of Economy, Trade and Industry (Japan)
- Ministry of Digital Economy and Society (Thailand)
- Egypt-Japan University of Science and Technology
