= Asia-Pacific International University =

Private Christian university in Thailand

- มหาวิทยาลัยนานาชาติเอเชีย-แปซิฟิก
- Former name: Mission College
- Motto: Quality Education in an Exotic Land
- Type: Private
- Established: 1947
- Affiliations: APHEIT; ACUCA
- Religious affiliation: Seventh-day Adventist Church
- Academic affiliations: Bangkok Adventist Hospital; Southern Adventist University; Walla Walla University; La Sierra University; Avondale College
- Chairman: Somchai Chuenjit
- President: Siroj Sorajjakool
- Students: approx. 1200
- Location: Muak Lek (Main campus); Bangkok (Mission Faculty of Nursing), Saraburi, Thailand; 14.674417°N 101.176869°E
- Campus: Muak Lek: rural (Main campus) Bangkok: urban (Mission Faculty of Nursing)
- Website: www.apiu.edu

Asia-Pacific International University is a private Christian university located in Saraburi, Thailand. Its main campus is in the rural town of Muak Lek, Saraburi Province and the nursing school is located on the grounds of Bangkok Adventist Hospital in downtown Bangkok. It is the only tertiary education institution serving the Southeast Asia Union Mission of Seventh-day Adventists. Asia-Pacific International University was formerly called Mission College (Thai: วิทยาลัยมิชชัน) until mid-2009 when it was granted university status. It is a part of the Seventh-day Adventist education system, the world's second largest Christian school system.

The university is a union of three former institutions: Southeast Asia Union College in Singapore, Bangkok Adventist Hospital School of Nursing, and Mission College, Muak Lek Campus. It also contains a heritage research center of the Ellen G. White Estate and a translation and language research center that focuses on translating material into ethnic minority languages such as Hmong and Karen.

== History ==
=== Southeast Asia Union College ===
Southeast Asia Union College (SAUC), the oldest of the three former institutions was first established as Singapore Training School (a secondary school) by G F Jones, the first Adventist missionary in Southeast Asia. In the early 1920s, the school moved to a larger site on Upper Serangoon Road where it continued to operate until the late 1990s. During the 1950s, the school introduced tertiary level studies and gained Junior College status in 1956. A two-year program was offered in Ministerial Training was followed soon with similar programs in education and business. In the late 1960s the institution expanded into a small liberal arts college and offered its first bachelor's degree programs in Education and Theology. The development led to a significant rise in enrolment although the college still lacked accreditation because of government regulations. SAUC began developing its teaching faculty and resources and explored partnerships with other Adventist institutions overseas. In 1984, the college began offering fully accredited American degree programs through an affiliation with Walla Walla College, Washington, US. By the mid-1990s the college's offerings had grown to include business administration, computer information systems, office administration, religion, and the teaching of English as a second language (TESOL).

In 1996, the Singapore Government announced its intention to expropriate the college property for a major urban transport development project, thus suspending further development. Church leaders were obliged to look into relocating its center of higher education in Southeast Asia. By July 1998 remaining students had been transferred to other institutions and the college activities were terminated in Singapore. Moveable assets were sold or transferred to Muak Lek, Thailand. The Seventh-day Adventist School, which was co-located with the college, merged with San Yu High School to form the present-day San Yu Adventist School at Thomson Road and some of the college's property, such as its auditorium seats, was donated to the school.

=== Mission Faculty of Nursing ===
The first attempts to initiate a School of Nursing in Bangkok occurred in 1941 in connection with the establishment of the Bangkok Adventist Medical Clinic. The outbreak of hostilities in the South-east Asia region during World War II, however, led to the evacuation of overseas medical personnel after a few months and the project was suspended.

The cessation of hostilities in 1945 enabled the re-establishment of medical work. Bangkok Adventist Hospital relocated to a new site in central Bangkok on Pitsanulok Road, purchased in 1946. A year later a School of Nursing was opened on the hospital compound under the leadership of Mrs Ellen Waddell as Chief Nurse at the new hospital and Ruth Monroe as Director of the School of Nursing. Their mission, "To train competent, caring nurses, and to teach young people about God's love." Dr & Mrs Waddell personally interviewed and chose the first 33 students for the program. Three years later in 1950 the School celebrated its first graduation awarding diplomas to 25 nurses.

During its first stage of development in the 1950s the School experienced rapid growth and the construction of additional facilities became necessary. The hospital, School and its graduates became widely respected for their competence and care and the quality of their training.

Study programs were expanded in 1955 with the addition of a course in Midwifery followed later by programs in Medical Technology, X-ray Technology and Anesthesia. These were later discontinued due to changes in medical practice and curriculum requirements. In 1969 a separate midwifery clinic with dormitories and facilities for graduate nurses was opened in Chiengkhong, Bangkok. Further curriculum revisions and the expansion of the program enabled Midwifery instruction to be incorporated into the School's basic nursing curriculum.

In 1958 a new three-storey residence and classroom building was officially opened by Queen Sirikit of Thailand. Throughout ensuing years the college continued to receive the patronage of the Royal Family.

Under the guidance of Mrs (now Dr) Salinee Navaratana (née Svetalekha) during the 1980s and in response to government initiatives and developments in the nursing profession the School restructured its pre-service nursing program and in 1986 introduced a four-year Bachelor of Science in Nursing. At the same time in connection with these developments a new classroom building was opened in (1988) and the name of the institution was changed to Mission College. Mrs. Salinee served the institution for 23 years first as Director and then as president for a further 11 years. During her administration government accreditation was secured both for the nursing program and for new liberal arts programs introduced at a new branch campus at Muak Lek. By 2000, the School had graduated over 1,000 nurses.

=== Mission College Muak Lek Campus ===
The idea of developing a college campus at Muak Lek was developed by Church workers in consultation with the Thailand Adventist Mission to meet the needs of higher education among Thai Adventist youth. A rural setting was chosen because it was considered more conducive to study than a location in the city. Opened in 1988 as a branch campus of Mission College in Bangkok, the institution also incorporated the Thailand Adventist Seminary, which for some years had been providing a non-accredited ministerial training program.

The early development of the new campus with limited financial resources was a venture of faith. Faculty and students worked together in building and developing facilities as their primary extracurricular activity. Development of the new campus was carried out largely by Mr Wayne Hamra with the support of Dr Helen Sprengel. Dr Siroj Sorajjikool and Dr Jon Dybahl established an academically sound four-year degree curriculum in accounting, management and english language which were approved by the Ministry of University Affairs in 1993. The campus celebrated its first graduation in 1994.

=== The New Mission College ===
The logo of Mission College

In 1996 with SAUC in Singapore facing closure, Church leaders undertook a nine-month intensive study on possible relocation options which concluded with a decision to create a new international institution based at Muak Lek. The new college would combine the quality international programs of Southeast Asia Union College and retain and develop the Thai-medium programs operated by Mission College to create a bilingual institution.

The restructured Mission College at Muak Lek would be responsible for continuing the nursing program in Bangkok and Thai programs as required. The campus would be developed into an international standard educational center offering both undergraduate and graduate international programs. The ambitious plan envisaged the institution quickly maturing to university status and generating satellite campuses in various South-east Asian countries.

In January 1997 the development of the new facilities and academic programs commenced with much urgency. The first new degree following an international-type (English medium) curriculum received government approval in early 1999 and by early 2001 the college was able to offer a further eight international majors officially approved by the Ministry of University Affairs. At the same, a number of faculty from SAUC were chosen and sponsored to complete postgraduate and doctoral studies at Andrews University and La Sierra University in the United States with the intent of sending them to Muak Lek to assist the further development of the newly implemented academic programs and curriculum.

A dramatic change in the physical outlook of the campus took place with a complete redesign of the campus and the erection of state-of-the-art facilities to accommodate and educate up to 1500 students. The academic and physical re-development of Mission College Muak Lek campus between 1997 and 2001 has been the largest one-time development program for an Adventist institution in the entire 150-year history of Seventh-day Adventist education. The development involved the investment of over US$ 20 million. By July 2002 the last of the building developments and the extensive campus landscaping work was completed.

=== Asia-Pacific International University ===
On 30 June 2009, Churin Laksanawisit, the Thai Minister of Education signed the documents conferring university status on the college. The name of the institution was changed to Asia-Pacific International University. Despite the name change, the university is still popularly known to locals and alumni by its original name Mission College, or simply "Mission" (มิชชัน).

==== Ellen G. White Research Center ====
On 21 February 2025, the Ellen G. White Research Center was officially inaugurated at the Muak Lek campus, marking the university's dedication to heritage scholarship and research into the legacy of Ellen G. White.

=== Presidents ===
- Dr Siriporn Tantipoonwinai (2001–06)
- Dr Warren Shipton (2006–10)
- Dr Loren G. Agrey (2010–2015)
- Dr Danny Rantung (2016–2019)
- Dr Siroj Sorajjakool (2019–2022)
- Dr. Damrong Satayavaksakoon (2022–2023)
- Dr Jarurat Sriratanaprapat (2023–present)

== Academics ==
Asia-Pacific International University (AIU) offers a range of undergraduate and graduate degree programs across various faculties. Instruction is primarily delivered in English, with the exception of select programs offered in Thai. The university follows a semester-based academic calendar and has a holistic, Christian approach to education consistent with the values of the Seventh-day Adventist Church.

=== Faculties and programs ===
AIU is organized into the following faculties:

- Faculty of Arts and Humanities – Offers the Bachelor of Arts in English for Professional Purposes, with emphases in Business, Communication, and TESOL (Teaching English to Speakers of Other Languages).
- Faculty of Business Administration – Offers the Bachelor of Business Administration with majors in Accounting and Management.
- Faculty of Education – Offers a Bachelor of Education in Elementary Education. ( Also used to offer Bachelor Education & Psychology )
- Faculty of Information Technology – Offers a Bachelor of Science in Information Technology.
- Faculty of Religious Studies – Offers a Bachelor of Arts in Christian Studies.
- Faculty of Science – Offers a Bachelor of Science in Bioscience with emphases in Biology, Clinical Lab, and Community Public Health.
- Mission Faculty of Nursing – Based in Bangkok, this faculty offers the Bachelor of Nursing Science (B.N.S) degree.

=== International program ===
The international program is open to international and Thai students who meet the standard requirements, including proficiency in English, which is the medium of instruction.

==== Undergraduate ====
Bachelor's degrees are offered in business, biology, nursing, education, religious education and theology. There is an ESL (English as a Second Language) option to assist students who do not speak English as a native language in transitioning to university-level competency.

As part of the worldwide Seventh-day Adventist education system, the university has transfer agreements with affiliated colleges and universities such as La Sierra University, Griggs University and Loma Linda University in the US and Avondale College in Australia. Asian students thus have a financially viable option of beginning their degree at AIU before transferring overseas.

==== Graduate Programs ====
Graduate-level offerings include:

- Master of Business Administration (MBA) with emphases in Accounting and Management
- Master of Education (M.Ed.) with emphases in Curriculum and Instruction, Educational Administration, and TESOL

=== Thai program ===
Students in the Thai program have the same degree options (except Education) as international students, the only exception being the medium of instruction. However, the Bachelor of Nursing degree is taught on both English and Thai.

== Accreditation and affiliations ==
AIU's academic programs are accredited by Thailand's Ministry of Higher Education, Science, Research, and Innovation (MHESI) and recognized by the Thai Civil Service Commission. It is also accredited by the Adventist Accrediting Association (AAA) and is part of the global network of Seventh-day Adventist educational institutions.

The university maintains academic cooperation agreements with international partners including Loma Linda University, La Sierra University, Andrews University (USA), Sahmyook University (Korea), and Adventist institutions in the Philippines, Indonesia, Hong Kong, and Peru.

== See also ==
- Seventh-day Adventist Church
- Seventh-day Adventist theology
- History of the Seventh-day Adventist Church
- List of Seventh-day Adventist colleges and universities
- Seventh-day Adventist education
- Adventist International Mission School
