= Siam University =

Private university in Bangkok, Thailand

Coordinates: 13°43′18″N 100°27′11.5″E

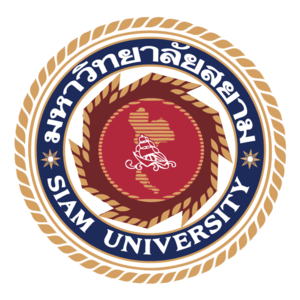
- Motto: Wisdom for Future (ปัญญาเป็นรัตนะของนรชน)
- Type: Private, Coeducational
- Established: 1965
- President: Dr. Pornchai Mongkhonvanit
- Location: Phet Kasem Road, Phasi Charoen, Bangkok, Thailand
- Campus: Phasi Charoen
- Colours: Yellow, Brown
- Nickname: SU, Siam U.
- Website: www.siam.edu

Siam University (SU, Thai: มหาวิทยาลัยสยาม) is a university located on Phet Kasem Road in Phasi Charoen District, Bangkok. Siam University was founded by the late Narong Mongkhonvanit as a three-year private engineering school in 1965.

In 1973, Siam University, then known as Siam Technical College, was formally established as a higher education institution with authorization to grant degrees. Later in 1986, Siam Technical College became Siam Technical University, a full-fledged private, non-profit university. Three years later, the name was changed again to Siam University to reflect the diversity in the fields of study offered.

In 1995, the international college was established. Currently, over 400 international students from more than 15 countries are enrolled in the international college of Siam University.

The governing body of Siam University is the university council led by Kasem Wattanachai, councilor of the Privy Council of Thailand.

== Siam University International MBA program ==
Siam University provides Master of Business Administration in both Thai and English language.

== Siam University School of Medicine ==
The Faculty of Medicine, Siam University is the second private medical school in Thailand. It was established in 2010 by a group of physicians, with the aim of increasing the number of doctors in Thailand, particularly in rural areas where the number of medical doctors is deficient. It has been assessed on quality by the Medical Council of Thailand in 2012 and started the first semester in August 2013.

== International College ==
The curriculum was approved by the Office of Higher Education Commission of Thailand. Students are required to complete general education courses (languages, computer applications) and business administration courses (accounting, finance, marketing, organization management, human resources), but choose their own specialty based on international business or hotel & tourism majors. Bongkosh Rittichainuwat serves as the Dean of International College. Siam University also offers programs in business, social studies and economics.

== Notable alumni ==
- Chattarika Ubonsiri, beauty pageant
- Songkran Atchariyasap, lawyer
- Punyawee Sukkulworasate, news anchor and television host
- Bunyita Ngamsappasin, news anchor
- Prapaipan Sengprasert, politician
- Treechada Petcharat, actress
- Kimberley Anne Woltemas, actress
- Phasut Banyaem, actor
- Thanida Thamwimon, singer
- Thanik Kamontharanon, actor
- Nilawan Iamchuasawad, net idol, singer, actress
