= Shinawatra University =

University in Pathum Thani, Thailand

Coordinates: 14°06′06″N 100°25′57″E

- มหาวิทยาลัยชินวัตร (Thai); 西那瓦国际大学 (Chinese)
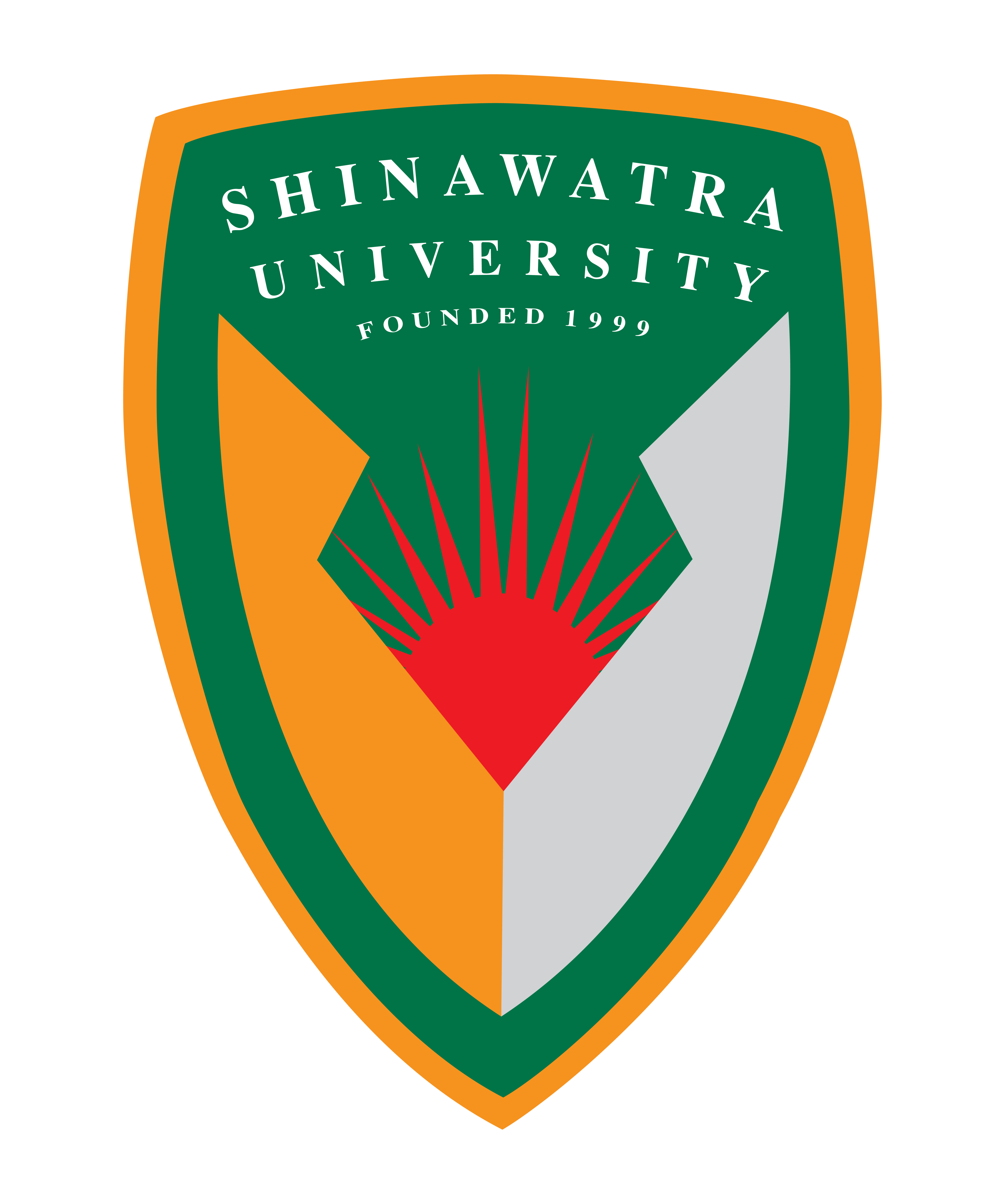
- Former name: Metharath University
- Type: Private
- Established: 1999
- Founder: Thaksin Shinawatra
- President: Zhou Fei (Price Chow)
- Location: Thailand
- Campus: Pathum Thani
- Website: www.siu.ac.th

Chinese name
- Simplified Chinese: 西那瓦国际大学
- Traditional Chinese: 西那瓦國際大學
Transcriptions
Standard Mandarin
- Hanyu Pinyin: Xīnàwǎ Guójì Dàxué

Shinawatra University (SIU), formerly Metharath University (MRU), is a private international university in Thailand, established by Thaksin Shinawatra and his colleagues. The campus was designed and developed by Soontorn Boonyatikarn in 1997. The Ministry of University Affairs granted the license for operation in 1999. The first Shinawatra University Council Meeting was held on 19 May 2000, and the first batch of students was admitted in September 2002. As of 2018, the university had students and faculty members of over 30 nationalities.

== Main campus ==
The main campus is in Pathum Thani Province, 50 kilometers from Bangkok. Its buildings received both the Asia Energy Award and the Energy Efficient Building 2003 Award.

== Computer facilities ==
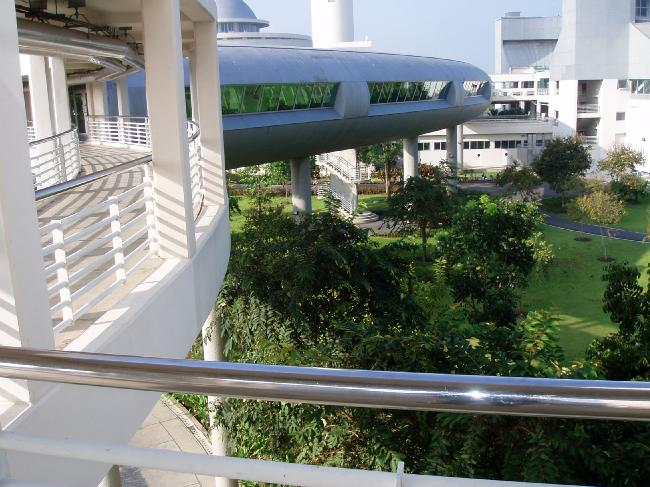
Skylink

Classrooms contain computers and LCD visualizers connected to projectors. The university a fast Internet connection and Wi-Fi available in all buildings. Students are provided with accounts, e-mail facilities, and Web space.

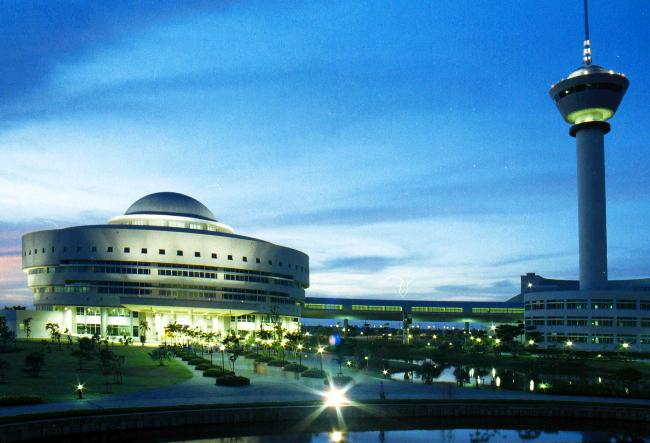
Main campus

Laboratories include:

- Apple Laboratory, with iMac, iPad2, iPod Touch devices and a projector, on the ground floor of the main academic building,
- Architectural and Environmental Design Studio with computer-aided design (CAD) software, on the fifth floor of the main academic building,
- Computer Networking, Operating System and Microprocessor Laboratory, on the third floor of the main academic building,
- Computer Programming Laboratory, on the third floor of the main academic building,
- Electronics and Circuits Laboratory, on the second floor of the laboratory building,
- General Computer Laboratory with printers, on the third floor of the main academic building,
- Language Laboratories, on the third floor of the main academic building and on the ground floor of the dormitory.

== Dormitories ==
First-year students are required to stay in the air-conditioned dormitories on Pathumthani campus during the semesters and summer sessions. There are separate facilities for men and women. Computer network and telephone connections are available in each room. On each floor there is a students' common room.

== Library ==
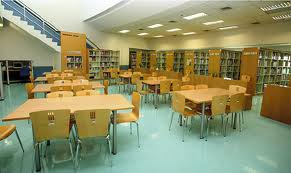

The Shinawatra University Library uses the Library of Congress classification system. Search via the Internet is supported. The library implemented RFID (radio frequency identification) book handling technology in December 2002, the first in Thailand to do so.
