= Rajamangala University of Technology Srivijaya =

- มหาวิทยาลัยเทคโนโลยีราชมงคลศรีวิชัย (มทร. ศรีวิชัย)
- Former names: Southern Technic College (Songkhla Campus) Nakhon Si Thammarat School of Agriculture (Nakhon Si Thammarat Campus) Trang Department of Fisheries and Science (Trang Campus)
- Type: Public, RMUT
- Established: January 18, 2005
- President: Prof. Suwat Tanyaros
- Royal conferrer: Maha Chakri Sirindhorn, Princess Royal of Thailand
- Faculty: 14 (11 faculties and 3 colleges)
- Location: Songkhla, Thailand; 7.201374°N 100.600079°E
- Campus: 3 (at Songkhla, Nakhon Si Thammarat, Trang)
- Colors: Yellow blue
- Website: www.rmutsv.ac.th

Rajamangala University of Technology Srivijaya (abbreviated as RMUTSV; Thai: มหาวิทยาลัยเทคโนโลยีราชมงคลศรีวิชัย) was established by the Rajamangala University of Technology Act on 18 January 2005.

== History ==
Rajamangala University of Technology Srivijaya is a group university located in the south of Thailand. The main campus in Songkhla opened as the Southern Technic College in 1954 with only 3 departments, while the Nakhon Si Thammarat and Trang campuses were originally the Nakhon Si Thammarat School of Agriculture and the 'Trang Department of Fisheries and Science respectively. Following the National Education Act (B.E. 2542 (1999)) which aimed to decentralize management in education institutes, Rajamangala Institute of Technology amended the law before enacting it as the “Rajamangala University of Technology Act,” which HM the King signed on 8 January 2005.

The law came into effect on 19 January 2005, combining all campuses nationwide into nine Rajamangala Universities of Technology: RMUT Thanyaburi, RMUT Krungthep, RMUT Tawan-ok, RMUT Phra Nakhon, RMUT Rattanakosin, RMUT Lanna, RMUTSV Srivijaya, RMUT Suvarnabhumi, RMUT Isan.

The nine universities offer advanced vocational training at undergraduate, graduate and Ph.D. levels. All nine RMUT are under the supervision of the Office of Commission on Higher Education (OCHE), Ministry of Education.

== Campus ==
RMUTSV is composed of three provincial areas including five campuses:

- Songkhla
- Nakhonsithammarat (Thung Yai) Campus
- Nakhonsithammarat (Sai Yai) Campus
- Nakhonsithammarat (Khanom) Campus
- Trang Campus

RMUTSV offers education at the graduate level in ten faculties and three colleges in Agriculture, Agro-industry, Architecture, Business Administration, Engineering, Liberal Arts, Management Technology Science and Technology, Science and Fisheries and Technology, and Veterinary Medicine and College of Hospitality and Tourism, College of Industrial Technology and Management and Rattaphum College.

RMUTSV has 15,000 students. There are 4,000-5,000 enrollment students each year.
