= Nakhon Phanom (disambiguation) =

Nakhon Phanom is a town in northeastern Thailand.

Nakhon Phanom may also refer to:

- Nakhon Phanom Province
- Mueang Nakhon Phanom district
- Nakhon Phanom Airport
- Nakhon Phanom Royal Thai Air Force Base
- Nakhon Phanom University
