= Osaka Institute of Technology =

Private university in Osaka Prefecture, Japan

Coordinates: 34°43′50.89″N 135°32′37.07″E

- 大阪工業大学
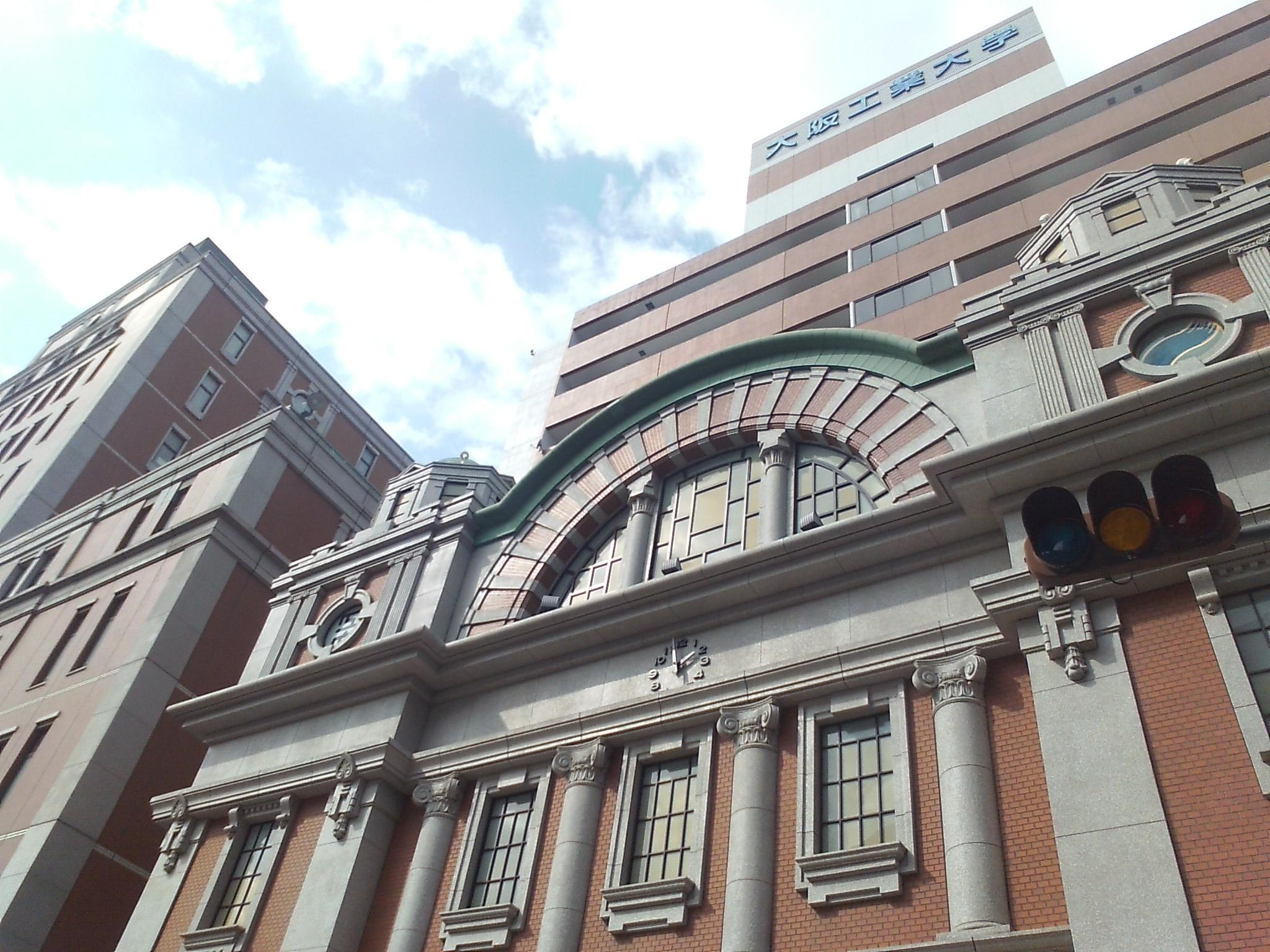
- Omiya campus
- Established: 1922
- Parent institution: Josho Gakuen Educational Foundation
- Chair: Yasushi Nishimura
- President: Susumu Inoue
- Website: www.oit.ac.jp/english

- Location within Osaka Prefecture

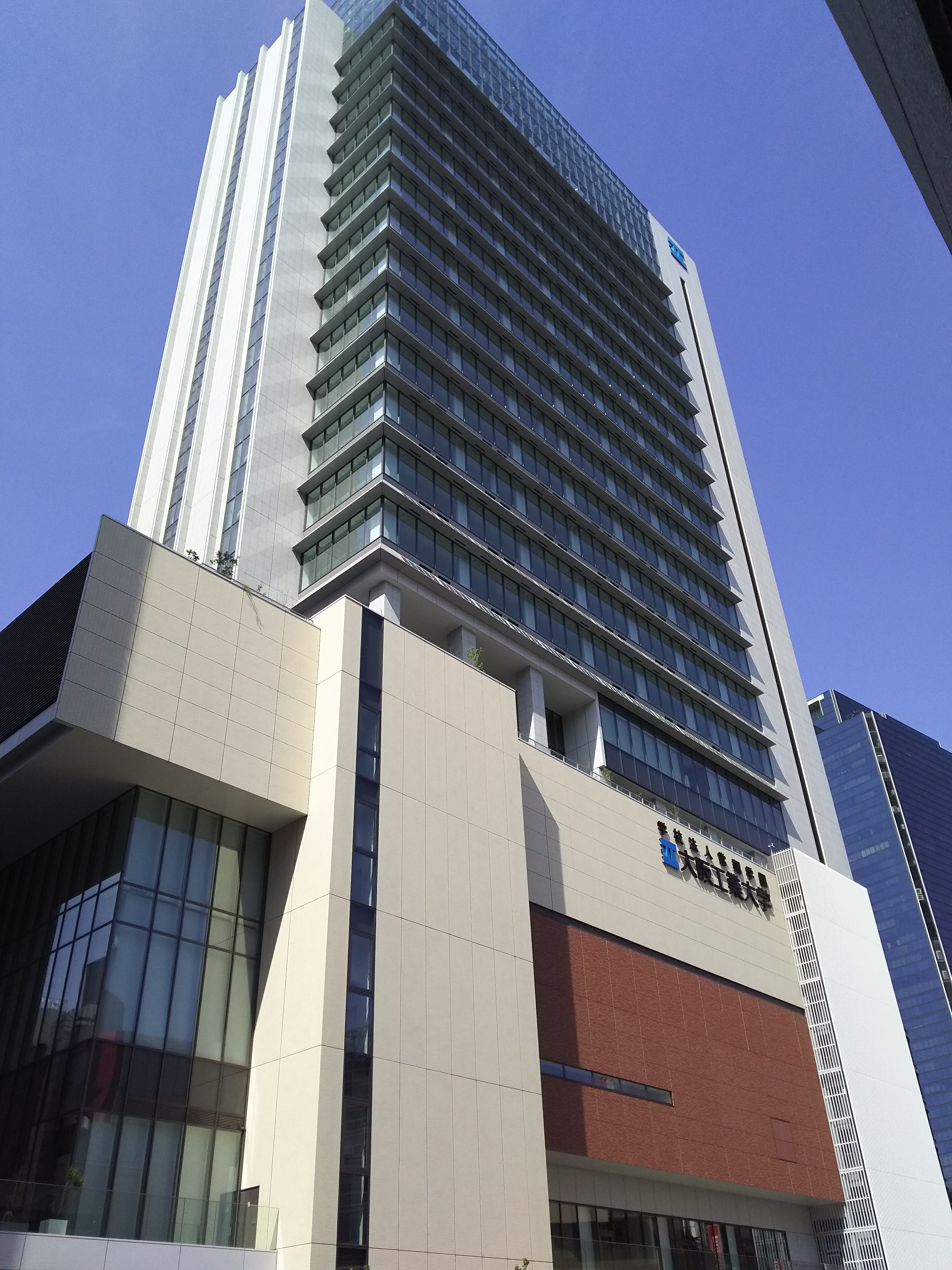
Umeda campus

Osaka Institute of Technology (OIT, 大阪工業大学, Ōsaka kōgyō daigaku), abbreviated as Dai kōdai (大工大), Han kōdai (阪工大), or Osaka kōdai (大阪工大) is a private university in Osaka Prefecture, Japan. OIT has 3 campuses, Omiya campus located in Asahi-ku, Osaka City, Umeda campus located in Kita-ku, Osaka City and Hirakata campus located in Hirakata City.

== History ==
OIT was originally founded in 1922 as Kansai Engineering Technical School by business man Kyosaburo Honjo, together with architect Yasushi Kataoka, who graduated from Tokyo Imperial University (present University of Tokyo) and also served as the school's first principal. The Mission is "For the World, for the People and for the Community", to develop specialists with science-based practical skills who play an important role in society.

In 1940, the school foundation established Kansai Advanced Technical School, a three-year college for men (for ages 17–20). Kansai Advanced Technical School was renamed to Setsunan Advanced Technical School in 1942, further renamed Setsunan Engineering Technical School in 1944.

In April 1949, Setsunan Engineering Technical School was upgraded to Setsunan Institute of Technology, a four-year university under Japan's new educational systems. In October 1949, it was renamed to Osaka Institute of Technology (OIT).

At first, OIT had one faculty: the so-called Faculty of Engineering, which consisted of three departments (Architecture, Civil Engineering, Electrical Engineering). Later on, OIT added several departments (Mechanical Engineering, Electronics Engineering, Applied Chemistry, Environmental Engineering, Biomedical Engineering), three faculties (Faculty of Information Science and Technology, Faculty of Intellectual Property, Faculty of Robotics and Design), and a graduate school which includes doctoral-level courses.

- 1949: Faculty of Engineering
- 1965: Graduate School (Department of Engineering Research; master's courses only)
- 1967: Ph.D. courses offered
- 1996: Faculty of Information Science and Technology
- 2003: Faculty of Intellectual Property
- 2017: Faculty of Robotics and Design

As of April 2017, OIT has four faculties. The Faculty of Intellectual Property was the first-ever and is still the only one of its kind in Japan. Moreover, the Faculty of Robotics and Design provides design thinking education to stress an innovative and creative approach towards design.

OIT has three campuses:

- Omiya campus: Faculty of Engineering, Faculty of Intellectual Property
- Umeda campus: Faculty of Robotics and Design
- Hirakata campus: Faculty of Information Science and Technology

The Umeda campus was opened in 2017 near Osaka station and is housed in the 21-storey OIT Umeda Tower, located in the central business district (CBD).

== Education ==
From Academic Year 2017, OIT offers 16 undergraduate degrees and 6 master's degrees in the field of engineering, robotics and design, information science and technology, and intellectual property. It also offers 5 doctoral degrees in the fields of engineering, robotics and design, information science and technology. OIT offers a number of project-based learning opportunities, including:

- Solar car project
- Challenge of the OIT MONOLAB robot project
- Human-powered aircraft project
- Development of wireless electric vehicle charging system (Kawakami-mura eco project)
- Science à la carte école project
- Smartphone application design project
- Computer design project
- The IP (intellectual property) PR project

== Faculties (undergraduate schools) ==
- Intellectual property (in Omiya) – the only one and first-ever Faculty in Japan
  - Department of Intellectual Property
- Engineering (in Omiya)
  - Department of Architecture
  - Department of Civil Engineering and Urban Design
  - Department of Electrical and Electronic Systems Engineering
  - Department of Electronics and Information System Engineering
  - Department of Mechanical Engineering
  - Department of Applied Chemistry
  - Department of Environmental Engineering
  - Department of Biomedical Engineering
- Robotics and design (in Umeda) *"Design thinking" education as innovative & creative approach
  - Department of Robotics
  - Department of Design and Architecture
  - Department of System Design *IoT, AI
- Information Science and Technology (in Hirakata)
  - Department of Computer Science
  - Department of Data Science
  - Department of Information Systems
  - Department of Media Science
  - Department of Information Networks

== Graduate schools ==
- Intellectual property (professional degree course)
  - Major in intellectual property
- Engineering (master's and Ph.D. courses)
  - Major in architecture, civil engineering and urban design
  - Major in electrical, electronic, and mechanical engineering
  - Major in applied chemistry, environmental, and biomedical engineering
- Robotics and design (master's and Ph.D. dourses)
  - Major in robotics and design
- Information science and technology (master's and Ph.D. courses)
  - Major in information science and technology

== Research centers ==
Omiya campus:

- Center for Monodzukuri management
- Nanomaterials microdevices research center

Umeda campus:

- Human robotics R&D center
- Robotics & design denter

Hirakata campus:

- Yawata Engineering Laboratories
  - Structure research center
  - Hydraulic research center
  - High voltage research center
- Digital archive center
- Virtual reality laboratory
- Visualization software developing center

== Rankings ==
- Times Higher Education World University Rankings(THE)

Focusing on the field of Engineering & Information Technology, OIT was ranked 801–1000th in the World University Rankings 2021 and ranked in TOP10 Private Universities in Japan. Especially in terms of the Score of “Citations”, OIT was placed next to Osaka University in Japan Universities and higher ranking than Tokyo University of Science and Shibaura Institute of Technology in the Private Universities. Moreover, OIT was ranked 401+ in the Asia University Rankings 2021 as well.

- SCImago Institutions Rankings(SIR)

OIT was ranked 58th in the Japan University Rankings 2019 focusing on the field of “Innovation” and 75th in Japan University Rankings 2018 focusing on the field of “Research”.

- "Truly Strong Universities" for Employment (Toyo Keizai Japan University Rankings)

OIT was ranked 2nd in the Japan University Rankings 2020 and it was the higher ranking than Tokyo University of Science and Shibaura Institute of Technology in the Private Universities. Especially focusing on the field of Information Technology & Digital media, OIT at Faculty of Information Science and Technology was ranked No.1 in 2019 from Institute of technology in Japan.

== Innovations ==
=== Research ===
2026: A research group by OIT researcher at Department of Electronic and Information Systems Engineering and Nara Institute of Science and Technology (NAIST) developed a new method for accurately identifying cancer cells using AI analysis of white-light scattering spectra in cytological diagnosis. The study also revealed a new principle enabling high-precision classification of cancer cells and normal cells, potentially contributing to more accurate and efficient cancer diagnosis.

2025: A research group led by OIT Professor at Faculty of Robotics and Design developed a robot system that operates by rearranging multiple pieces of equipment to investigate and restore river channel blockages that occur in mountainous areas due to earthquakes or heavy rain. Previously, it relied on manual intervention to avoid the risk of secondary damage, but now remote control is possible, making a significant contribution to disaster prevention and mitigation.

2024: OIT researchers at Department of Applied Chemistry and INRAE(Institut national de recherche pour l'agriculture, l'alimentation et l'environnement) developed soap-like air bubbles (gas marbles) stabilized with cinnamon particles. The gas marbles are edible capsules that make sounds when you bite into them, and they can also be used to decorate cakes and other items.

2023: According to “Scientist Database based on Standardized Citation Indicators” updated by Stanford University and Elsevier as a comprehensive list that identifies “TOP 2% of the world's most influential researchers” (*Category: Career-long), OIT's 4 professors from Department of Applied Chemistry, Biomedical Engineering, and Mechanical Engineering were selected.

2022: OIT researchers at Department of Applied Chemistry and UMET that is the joint research unit of Lille University of Science and Technology and French National Centre for Scientific Research(CNRS) developed an innovative ‘Micro reaction vessel’ that can initiate a reaction by irradiating light using droplets (Liquid Marbles). This research was supported by JSPS(Japan Society for the Promotion of Science), and the research paper was published in ‘ACS Applied Materials & Interfaces’.
2022: OIT researchers at the Department of Applied Chemistry, in collaboration with the ORIST(Osaka Research Institute of Industrial Science and Technology) and National Yang Ming Chiao Tung University(NYCU), developed a new conductive organic material by designing a nickel complex incorporating a thienothiophene structure. The material achieved ‘the World's highest electrical conductivity’ for “n-type organic semiconductor” coating film while remaining stable in air, overcoming a major limitation of conventional n-type organic conductive materials. The researchers also confirmed its thermoelectric conversion properties, demonstrating its potential for application in flexible thermoelectric devices.The research was published in the Journal of the American Chemical Society (JACS).

2021: An international collaborative research group of OIT at Department of Applied Chemistry, Tokyo Institute of Technology and National Yang Ming Chiao Tung University developed an innovative method for preparing ‘Chiral Silica’ consisting of a molecular-scale helical structure by an extremely simple process. This research was promoted by the moonshot-type research and development project of the New Energy and Industrial Technology Development Organization(NEDO), and was published in the Open Access Journal ‘JACS Au’ of the American Chemical Society (ACS).

2020: A research group of University of Tokyo at Department of Applied Physics, RIKEN(Institute of Physical and Chemical Research) and OIT at Faculty of Information Science and Technology succeeded in developing an innovative “Transportable Optical lattice clock(OLC) with Ultra-precise measurements(10 to the power of minus 18)“ for the first time in the world through a verification testing on validity of Albert Einstein's general theory of relativity at Tokyo Skytree. Compared to conventional space experiments, using the transportable OLC on satellite and rocket, the equivalent experiments are available with a height difference of 10,000 times less.

2019: OIT researchers at Department of Applied Chemistry discovered that poly-3-hexylthiophene(P3HT), a conductive polymer widely used as a material for solar cells and transistors, has a new ability to convert light into heat. Since P3HT dissolves in organic solvents, it can be used as a paint, and can be applied to substrates of various shapes. Also it can be expected to be applied to local heating in a vacuum space or a fine space, such as hyperthermia, which uses heat in an outer space(space station or space shuttle) or kills cancer cells by heat. This innovative research was highly evaluated and published by the American Chemical Society (ACS) in the field of polymer. (Macromolecules 2019, 52, 2,708-717)

2018: OIT researcher at Department of Information Systems, Faculty of Information Science and Technology participated in “KAGRA”(Kamioka Gravitational Wave Detector) Project, a national project managed by Institute for Cosmic Ray Research (ICRR) of University of Tokyo and National Institutes of Natural Sciences(NINS)/National Astronomical Observatory of Japan(NAOJ)/High Energy Accelerator Research Organization(KEK) for Astrophysics & Information systems research on Gravitational-wave observatory. From Institute of technology in Japan, only Tokyo Institute of Technology and OIT were engaged in the project.

2017: OIT researcher at Department of System Design, Faculty of Robotics and Design jointly developed an innovative Odor Measuring Platform that allows them to analyze and evaluate different kinds of odors objectively together with Konica Minolta through open innovation. Based on the platform, Konica Minolta unveiled "Kun Kun"(or "Sniff Sniff") body. "Kun Kun" body, simply consisting of a device and a smartphone application, can measure odors of the scalp, armpits, skin behind the ears, and feet. Measured odor data are sent via Bluetooth and displayed in the smartphone app in 20 seconds or so. Odors are classified into 10 levels, allowing users to objectively decide whether they need to take some deodorizing measures. OIT has been researching ways of distinguishing different odors through neural network-based AI technology using gas sensor.

2016: OIT researcher at Department of Applied Chemistry jointly developed an innovative material transfer technology combining Liquid droplets (Liquid marble) covered with solid particles and Light together with Asahikawa Medical University and Max Planck Institutes. As it makes the Light directly convert into propulsion force, there is no power conversion process like photovoltaic power generation. It is eco-friendly and low-cost as well. The research paper was published in German scientific journal "Advanced Functional Materials".

2015: OIT researcher at Department of Applied Chemistry jointly developed an innovative technology, so-called "Non-sticky powdery adhesive" in the field of Biomimetics materials together with Max Planck Institutes. It was developed with hint that Aphids covers the surface of honey which they discharge by solid wax particles and prevents drowning due to honey in the nest by liquid marble. It was introduced to journal cover published by the Royal Society of Chemistry and Chemistry World in UK.

2012: An innovative Small satellite with Pulsed plasma thruster(PPT), named PROITERES(Project of OIT Electric-Rocket-Engine Onboard Small Space Ship) was developed by OIT researcher and students mainly from Department of Mechanical Engineering and it was launched in Sep 2012 on PSLV-C21 Rocket from Satish Dhawan Space Centre operated by Indian Space Research Organisation in India.

=== Business ===
2025: OIT held a kickoff event for the Social Open Innovation (SOI) Challenge 2025 together with the North Osaka Chamber of Commerce and Industry to promote industry–academia–government collaboration through idea generation and hackathon-based approaches to solve business challenges. Moreover, OIT “CIDRe” (Center for Innovation Design Education and Research), a Design thinking hub, organised “OIT Pitch” 2025, a business idea competition designed to encourage student entrepreneurship and innovation through the development of real-world business ideas.

2022: “Xport”, an Open Innovation hub jointly operated by OIT and OCCI (Osaka Chamber of Commerce and Industry), launched the Xport Startup Boost Program, so-called “REACH REACH”. The program provided startups with training in Business pitching, Public Relations, and Communication Strategies to enhance their ability to attract investment and create new business opportunities.

2021: OIT launched the “AI Data Science Recurrent Education Program”, a certificate program for business professionals. The program aimed to develop professionals capable of using AI and data-driven approaches to support business innovation.

2020: For acceleration of start-up business from Kansai region in Japan, OIT and Kobe University started a joint collaboration to support the University-led ventures in formulating Intellectual Property strategies and business models toward innovation with their venture funds.

2017: Japan's first "Robot Service Business School" was launched by New Energy and Industrial Technology Development Organization (NEDO) at OIT's Robotics & Design Center in OIT Umeda campus in order to provide an integrated education in the technology, design, and business expertise necessary with robotics innovation.

== Achievements and awards ==
- International
  - The OIT Solar Car Project team "Regalia" completed the ‘3,000 km race’ from Darwin to Adelaide in the Challenger Class of the Bridgestone World Solar Challenge (BWSC) 2025, the world's most prestigious solar car race held in Australia, finishing 14th overall in the world. The development of the solar car required the integration of Electrical engineering and Electronics engineering to convert solar energy into power, Mechanical engineering and Aerospace engineering to reduce vehicle weight and aerodynamic drag, and Control engineering and Information System engineering to optimize overall system efficiency.
  - Joint team "SHINOBI" from Kyoto University and OIT students at Department of Electronics and Information System Engineering won the “2nd prize“ in RoboCup Eindhoven 2024(Category: Rescue robot league).
  - Students from Faculty of Information Science and Technology monopolistically won the “Best prize” and “1st prize” with defeating University of Tokyo etc. in the Japan tournament 2019(Category: C/C++ Programming, 19,967 participants) of “Lan Qiao Cup” that is the largest Collegiate Programming competition in China. As of 2019, the OIT's winner was ranked as “No.1 C/C++ Programmer” in Japan universities.
  - OIT researcher at Department of System Design, Faculty of Robotics and Design won the “Sensors and Actuators Award 2018” for his outstanding research achievements at the International Association of Advanced Materials international conference in Stockholm. From the universities in Japan, the Advanced Materials Award was provided only to University of Tokyo and OIT.
  - Joint team "JoiTech" from Osaka University and OIT won the "World Championship"(*Category: Humanoid League Adult Size) in RoboCup 2013 for Robotics in Eindhoven.
    Moreover, OIT's own team ”OIT Trial” from Faculty of Robotics and Design together with Faculty of Information Science and Technology won the “World's No. 7 place” (*Category: @Home) in RoboCup 2017 in Nagoya.
  - Student team from Department of Electrical and Electronics Systems Engineering won the "3rd prize" and "Best Innovative Design Award" in the international student contest on IFEC(International Future Energy Challenge) 2015 hosted by IEEE at the University of Michigan–Dearborn. The topic was "High-efficiency Wireless Charging System for Electric Vehicles (EV) and other Applications". As Japanese university, OIT got through to the Final Competition and also won the award for the first time ever.
  - Student from Department of Electrical and Electronics Systems Engineering won the "Excellent Paper Award" in the International Conference on IEEE PEAC(Power Electronics Application Conference) 2014 in Shanghai. The topic was "A New V2H System with Single-Ended Inverter Drive Bidirectional Wireless Resonant IPT.
  - Student team from Faculty of Information Science and Technology passed the Domestic Preliminary competition(82 universities, 372 teams in Japan) on ACM International Collegiate Programming Contest(“ACM-ICPC”) 2015 and got through to the Asia Regional competition in Tsukuba. From the private universities in Japan, the qualifiers were only 3 universities, Keio University, Meiji University and OIT.
    In addition, back to the Asia Regional competition 2006, only Tokyo Institute of Technology and OIT were in the “Top 10” from Institute of technology in Japan, and also OIT was the only ranked from private universities in Japan. The OIT graduates who experienced this event joined Google, Yahoo and Information technology(IT) companies.
  - Graduate student from Electronics, Information and communication Engineering won the "Student Award" in the International symposium on ALC(Atomic Level Characterizations) 2015 for New Materials and Devices in Nagoya. The topic was "Surface potential distribution of insulating film on a conductive substrate irradiated by electron beam with an application of the bias-voltage". From the private universities in Japan, it was awarded only to Tokyo University of Science and OIT.
  - Graduate student from Electronics, Information and communication Engineering won the "Best Paper Award" in Photomask Japan 2014 organized by SPIE(Society of Photographic Instrumentation Engineers). The topic was "Electron beam current dependence on a surface potential distribution at a resist film on a conductive substrate".
  - Graduate student from Electronics, Information and communication Engineering won the "Student Travel Award" in the International Conference on EIPBN(Electron, Ion, and Photon Beam Technology and Nanofabrication) 2012 organized by IEEE Electron Devices Society in Hawaii. The topic was "Measurement of Surface Potential Distribution at an Insulating Film Produced by Fogging Electrons in a Scanning Electron Microscope". A variety of universities, countries, and topics were represented among the students receiving support. Students from 10 countries (including the US) and 33 universities(including MIT, Stanford University, Yale University, Carnegie Mellon University, Princeton University, University of British Columbia and more.) were among the recipients of student travel financial support. From the universities in Asia, it was awarded only to National University of Singapore, Peking University and OIT.
  - Student from Department of Architecture got through to "The 3rd Asian Contest of Architectural Rookie's Award" in Dalian as a member of Japan national team after winning the “1st prize” in "Kenchiku SHINJINSEN"(Architectural Rookie's Contest)2014 in Japan.

== Notable alumni ==
- Susumu Fujita, Politician and former Chairman of OIT.
- Hiroichi Sakai, Politician, a former member of the House of Representatives.
- Akio Yamaguchi, President at IBM Japan.
- Naosumi Tada, President at ZF Japan.
- Hiroyuki Koba, Chief engineer of TOYOTA C-HR.
- Hiroshi Yamamoto, Chief engineer of MAZDA Eunos Cosmo.
- Masahiro Umemura, CFO of KYOCERA.
- Takakuni Happo, Deputy president of TOKYU RAILWAYS.
- Masao Sakaguchi, Deputy president at KINDEN and former Chairman of OIT.
- Shinichi Hasegawa, Chairman of PACIFIC CONSULTANTS(PCKK).
- Tetsuo Kure, CEO at ALFRESA PHARMA and former Chairman of OIT.
- Takehiko Hasegawa, Founder of HASEKO.
- Katsuhiko Wakabayashi, Founder of HARDLOCK INDUSTRY providing an innovative nut that never comes loose used by NASA and Railway companies in UK, Australia, Japan and more.
- Keiichi Sato, professor emeritus at IIT Institute of Design.
- Weixing Ma, former associate professor of School of design & arts at Beijing Institute of Technology.
- Masatoshi Tomoi, MS(University of British Columbia), Japanese pioneer in the research of 2x4 Framing by wooden construction of North America in the Architecture.
- Masami Tanigawa, PhD(University of Tokyo), AIJ emeritus member, Japanese pioneer in the research of Frank Lloyd Wright.
- Yasushi Nishimura, PhD(Kyoto University), professor emeritus/Chairman of OIT and former visiting researcher specialised in Architectural engineering at UT Austin.
- Akimitsu Kurita, professor emeritus at OIT, former visiting researcher at Ruhr University Bochum(RUB) in the research of steel construction for bridge in the Civil engineering.
- Takahiro Tanaka, LLM(Washington University in St. Louis), Lawyer, Visiting professor at OIT.
- Yoshihide Yanagino, MSc(University of Portsmouth), Patent Attorney, Adjunct instructor at OIT.
- Kojiro Kitayama(younger brother of Tadao Ando), Architect and winner of AIA Honor Award together with Peter Eisenman.
- Kohki Hiranuma, Architect and winner of Grand Designs Awards (England), Innovative Architecture International Architectural Award (Italy).
- Koichiro Ikebuchi, Interior designer in Singapore and winner of Singapore President's Design Award (Designer of The Year, 2009).
- Sadatoshi Gassan, Japanese Swordsmith and holder of Intangible Cultural Property who has been continuing Gassan Samurai sword tradition for approximately 800 years.
- Koshu Tani, Science fiction writer.
- Yoshichika Iwasa, Explorer of Polynesia.
- Itaru Oki, Jazz trumpeter and flugelhornist.
- Carlos Kanno, former Percussionist of Orquesta de la Luz that was salsa band.
- Bin Kato, Film director and screenwriter.
- Yoshiyuki Abe, Racing cyclist.

== Membership/Cooperating organization ==
- IAESTE (International Association for the Exchange of Students for Technical Experience)Japan:

OIT is one of the "University member" and "Business supporting member" as well as The University of Tokyo, Tohoku University, Hokkaido University, Yokohama National University, Tokyo Metropolitan University, Tokyo University of Science and Waseda University. Especially from the universities in Kansai region, OIT is only listed as "Business supporting member" who can receive foreign trainees. OIT accepts a limited number of international research students under this program each year, and also dispatches students to other universities. - Trainees Accepted in OIT from; 2018: Slovak University of Technology (Slovakia) 2017: Gdańsk University of Technology, Lodz University of Technology (Poland) 2016: Brno University of Technology (Czech Republic), Budapest University of Technology and Economics (Hungary) 2015: Kwame Nkrumah University of Science and Technology (Republic of Ghana), Tomas Bata University in Zlín (Czech Republic) 2014: Norwegian University of Science and Technology (Norway), Federal University of Minas Gerais (Brazil) - Trainees Dispatched from OIT to; 2017: Manipal University (India) 2016: University of Information Science and Technology "St. Paul The Apostle" (North Macedonia) 2014: Karunya University (India)

- WIPO(World Intellectual Property Organization)

OIT cooperates with WIPO on organizing the conferences in order to evangelize the Intellectual Property(IP) in Asia. For instance, “Conference for Presidents/Vice-Presidents and Technology Transfer Officers of Universities and Research Institutions on Creating an Enabling Intellectual Property(IP) Environment for Technology Development, Management and Commercialization” in 2017. The overseas participants were mainly from Philippines, Thailand, Malaysia, Indonesia and Sri Lanka.

- JICA(Japan International Cooperation Agency)

OIT supports as Training Institution for JICA Training Course mainly related to Intellectual Property, such as "Japan-Mexico Strategic Global Partnership Training Program - Intellectual property rights". Other than Mexico, OIT received the trainees from Brazil, Argentina and Paraguay.

== Overseas Partner Universities ==
- Australia
  - Queensland University of Technology
  - Swinburne University of Technology
  - Deakin University
  - Victoria University (Australia)
- Austria
  - Vienna University of Technology
- Canada
  - OCAD University
  - University of Regina
- Hong Kong
  - City University of Hong Kong
- China
  - Tsinghua University
  - Zhejiang University
  - Tongji University
  - East China University of Science and Technology
  - University of Science and Technology Beijing
  - Nanjing Tech University
- Finland
  - Tampere University
  - University of Jyväskylä
- France
  - EPITECH(Paris Graduate School of Digital Innovation, formerly European Institute of Information Technology)
  - ENSAPVS(École nationale supérieure d'architecture de Paris-Val de Seine)
  - ESA(École spéciale d'architecture)
  - ENTPE(École nationale des travaux publics de l'État)
  - University of Strasbourg
  - University of Montpellier
  - University of Bordeaux
- Germany
  - Technical University of Munich
  - University of the Bundeswehr Munich
  - University of Wuppertal
  - Hochschule Hildesheim/Holzminden/Göttingen
- Italy
  - Polytechnic University of Turin
- India
  - Manipal University
- Indonesia
  - Sepuluh Nopember Institute of Technology
  - Hasanuddin University
  - University of Palangka Raya
  - Widya Mandala Catholic University
  - Mulawarman University
  - Bakrie University
- Malaysia
  - University of Technology Malaysia
  - University of Science Malaysia
  - University Technology Petronas
  - University Malaysia Sabah
- Mexico
  - University of Guanajuato
- Mongolia
  - Mongolian Institute of Engineering and Technology
- Netherlands
  - Delft University of Technology
  - Eindhoven University of Technology
- Norway
  - University of Stavanger
- Philippines
  - Mapua University
  - University of San Jose–Recoletos
- Poland
  - Wrocław University of Technology
- Saudi Arabia
  - King Abdulaziz University
- Senegal
  - Ziguinchor University
- Singapore
  - Singapore University of Technology and Design
- South Korea
  - Hanyang University
  - Chung-Ang University
  - Kookmin University
  - Gachon University
  - Inje University
  - Daejeon University
- Spain
  - University of Salamanca
  - Technical University of Madrid
- Sweden
  - Uppsala University
- Switzerland
  - University of Applied Sciences Northwestern Switzerland
- Taiwan
  - National Taipei University of Technology
  - National Taiwan University of Science and Technology
  - National Tsing Hua University
  - National Yang Ming Chiao Tung University
  - National Chung Hsing University
  - National Formosa University
  - National Yunlin University of Science and Technology
  - National Kaohsiung University of Science and Technology
  - Southern Taiwan University of Science and Technology
  - Shih Hsin University
  - Tatung University
- Thailand
  - Chulalongkorn University
  - Mahidol University
  - Thammasat University
  - Chiang Mai University
  - Rajamangala University of Technology Thanyaburi
  - Vidyasirimedhi Institute of Science and Technology(VISTEC)
  - Thai-Nichi Institute of Technology
- Turkey
  - Ozyegin University
- United States
  - Georgia Institute of Technology
  - San Jose State University
  - Rice University
  - Clemson University
  - University of Nevada, Reno
  - San Francisco State University
  - Angelo State University
- Vietnam
  - Da Nang University of Technology
  - Can Tho University
