= Aerogalnite =

Synthetic material

Aerogalnite (Aero-Gallium Nitride, Aero-GaN, AGaN) is a synthetic material consisting of networks of GaN interconnected microtubes. Due to the fact that the microtubes walls thickness is just several nanometers, the material is ultra-lightweight with a density of around 10 mg/cm3, being among the lightest synthetic materials. It was developed by joint efforts of researchers from Technical University of Moldova, Kiel University, University of Trento, University of New South Wales, and was first reported in a scientific journal in February 2019.

== Structure and properties ==
Aerogalnite is a pale-yellow freestanding highly porous, mechanically flexible and stretchable inorganic nanomaterial that is both hydrophobic and hydrophilic at the same time. Rolling a water droplet onto a bed of GaN hollow tetrapods results in the formation of a liquid marble with the entire surface covered with GaN aerotetrapods.

== Synthesis ==
The synthesis process includes the epitaxial growth of ultrathin layers of GaN on a sacrificial template consisting of an interpenetrated network of ZnO microtetrapods, followed by the gradual removal of the ZnO substrate. It results in a freestanding interpenetrated network of microtubular GaN with an ultrathin layer of ZnO on the inner surface of the walls. ZnO is a suitable substrate for GaN growth due to the fact that both materials have the same crystallographic wurtzite structure, close lattice parameters, and similar thermal expansion coefficients.

== Potential applications ==
Aerogalnite efficiently blocks electromagnetic field in a wide range of frequencies from X-band to THz region. Since GaN is a piezoelectric and piezoresistive material, the ultra-lightweight aerogalnite is very promising for pressure sensor application. Microtubular structures of GaN have shown their potential as self-propelled micromotors under irradiation with UV light.
