= Ganok Limtrakul =

Thai politician

Ganok Limtrakul MPCh MWM
- กนก ลิ้มตระกุล

Member of parliament of Uttaradit
- Incumbent
- Assumed office 22 September 2007
- Preceded by: Krissana Silak

Personal details
- Born: 22 September 1956 (age 69) Dusit district, Bangkok, Thailand
- Party: Pheu Thai
- Other political affiliations: National Development (1992–2004); Thai Rak Thai (2004–2006); People's Power (2007–2008)
- Occupation: Politician

Ganok Limtrakul (Thai: กนก ลิ้มตระกุล, RTGS: Ganok Limtrakun, pronounced [kà.nók lîm trà.kūːn]; born 22 September 1956) is a Thai politician who served as a member of the House of Representatives of Uttaradit Province, Thailand.

== Life and career ==
Ganok Limtrakul was born on September 22, 1956 in Dusit District, Bangkok to Pramuan Limtrakul, and his wife, Kalong Limtrakul.

Ganok studied at Uttaradit Rajabhat University and graduated at National Institute of Development Administration. He started political career as being the Member of parliament of Uttaradit for 3 times in 1992, 1995 and 1996. He signed up for the governor of Uttaradit as National Development Party but was lost to Krissana Silak.

In 2020, Ganok signed up for the Member of parliament of Uttaradit.

== Royal decorations ==
- 2011 – Knight Grand Cordon (Special Class) of the Most Exalted Order of the White Elephant
- 2008 – Knight Grand Cordon (Special Class) of the Most Noble Order of the Crown of Thailand
