= Bakrie University =

Private university in Jakarta, Indonesia

- Universitas Bakrie
- Motto in English: Experience The Real Things
- Type: Private University
- Established: 2009
- Rector: Sofia W. Alisjahbana
- Location: Jakarta, Indonesia; 6°13′17.4″S 106°50′0.5″E
- Campus: Urban
- Website: www.bakrie.ac.id
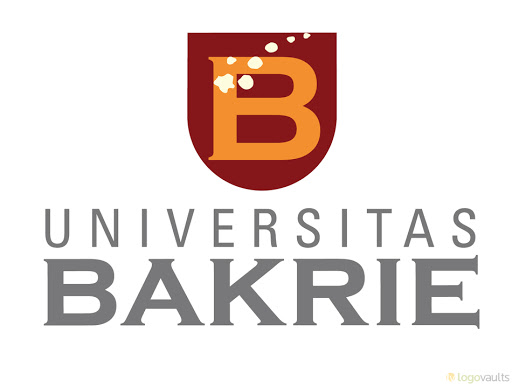

Bakrie University (Indonesian: Universitas Bakrie or informally U-Bakrie) is a private university in Jakarta, Indonesia, founded in 2009. It is located in Rasuna Epicentrum Jl. HR Rasuna Said Kav C-22, Kuningan, South Jakarta.

The university was established by the Yayasan Pendidikan Bakrie (Bakrie Education Foundation). In April 2011, the old campus ground was broken for a new campus at the Bogor Nirwana Residence.

== Programs ==
=== Undergraduate ===
- Management (Accreditation B)
- Accounting (Accreditation A)
- Communication studies (Accreditation A)
- Informatics (Accreditation B)
- Information system (Accreditation B)
- Political science (Accreditation A)
- Industrial engineering (Accreditation B)
- Civil engineering (Accreditation A)
- Environmental engineering (Accreditation B)
- Food science and technology (Accreditation B)
- Business (double degree with Central Queensland University)
- Digital media (double degree with Central Queensland University)
- Arts (public relations) (double degree with Central Queensland University)
- Information Technology (Cyber Security)(double degree with Central Queensland University)

=== Postgraduate ===
- Master of Management (Accreditation A)
- Master of Communication Science
- Master of Business Administration (double degree with Central Queensland University)

== Rankings ==
In the Times Higher Education Impact Rankings 2022, Bakrie University is ranked in the range of 801–1000 globally, in terms of commitment towards United Nations’ Sustainable Development Goals (SDGs), where Bakrie University ranked 101–200 for Climate Action (1st among Indonesian universities), 401–600 for Quality Education (5th among Indonesian universities), 201–300 for Zero Hunger (8th among Indonesian universities), 301–400 for Responsible Consumption & Production (8th among Indonesian universities), 401–600 for Peace, Justice & Strong Institutions (9th among Indonesian universities), 601+ for Reduced Inequalities (10th among Indonesian universities), ranking Bakrie University as 15th overall and 3rd for private universities in Indonesia and 1st for private universities in Jakarta. Bakrie University is also featured in THE World University Rankings 2022, THE Asia University Rankings 2022, THE Young University Rankings 2022, THE Emerging Economies University Rankings 2022, Round University Ranking (RUR) World University Rankings 2022, U-Multirank World University Rankings 2022, and UI Greenmetric World University Rankings 2021.

== International partnerships ==
As well as a dual degree MM-MBA partnership between Bakrie University and Central Queensland University, Australia, the two universities offer double degree undergraduate study programs in Jakarta. Bakrie University and Universiti Utara Malaysia (UUM) have a student mobility program, joint research through cross funding program and fast-track program to obtain a master's degree from UUM through a 3.5-year program at Bakrie University then continue one year at UUM.

Bakrie University has collaborations with several international institutions worldwide including:

- Stanford University, United States
- Tohoku University, Japan
- Aarhus University, Denmark
- Central Queensland University, Australia
- Tampere University of Technology, Finland
- Transilvania University of Brașov, Romania
- Caucasus University, Georgia
- Universiti Utara Malaysia, Malaysia
- Nihon University, Japan
- MARA University of Technology, Malaysia
- Higher School of Economics, Russia
- Tun Hussein Onn University of Malaysia, Malaysia
- Ritsumeikan University, Japan
- National University of Kaohsiung, Taiwan
- Rajamangala University of Technology, Thailand
- University of Zagreb, Croatia
- Osaka Institute of Technology, Japan
- National Formosa University, Taiwan
- Northern Virginia Community College, United States
- Chemeketa Community College, United States
