= Lak Hok =

Sub district in Mueang Pathum Thani district in Thailand

Coordinates: 13.966212°N 100.603526°E

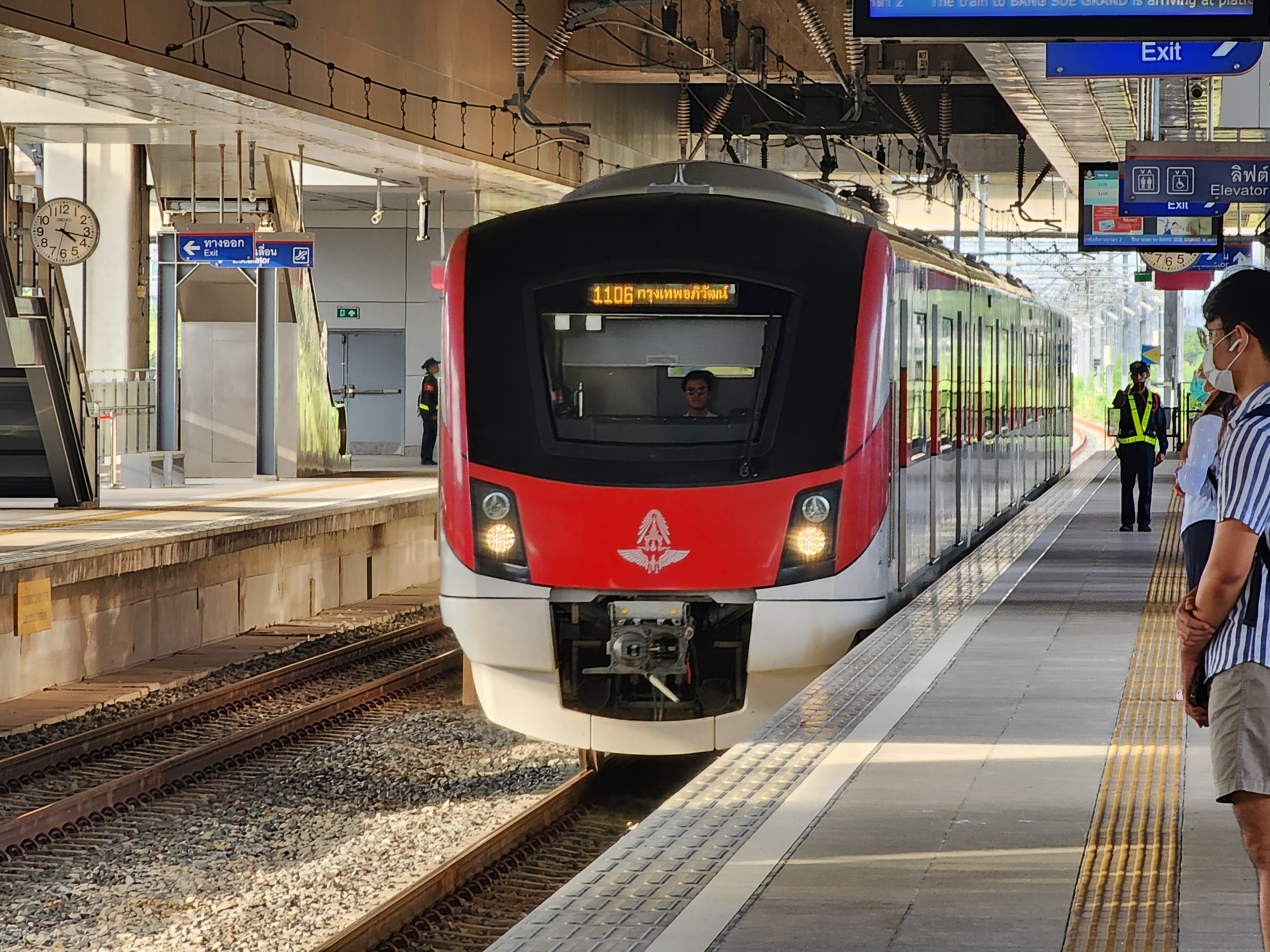
SRT Dark Red Line, Lak Hok (Rangsit University)

Lak Hok (Thai: หลักหก, pronounced [làk hòk]) is a tambon (sub-district) in Mueang Pathum Thani district, Pathum Thani province, Greater Bangkok.

== History ==
Its name "Lak Hok" means "sixth milepost", refers to sixth milepost of Khlong Prem Prachakon, a canal that dug in King Rama V's reign bridging downtown Bangkok to Bang Pa-in district in Phra Nakhon Si Ayutthaya province. The canal flows through the area.

Lak Hak was upgraded to a sub-district municipality from the sub-district administrative organization (TAO) on August 24, 2007.

In the Ayutthaya period, the area around Lak Hok was used to grow rice and plant sugarcane to be sent to feed the royal elephants in the royal court.

Passed to the Rattanakosin period, this area has been abandoned. In the King Rama IV's reign, Phra Phison Sombat Boribun, the courtier of the Kromma Tha Sai (the equivalent of the department of Chinese affairs in Siam) brought the Chinese to pioneer the cultivation of sugarcane, including building a sugarcane mill. Later, it was changed to rice cultivation.

== Geography ==
The terrain is a lowland with the Chao Phraya River running through the middle, which is separated into many different canals and waterways. Mueang Pathum Thani is situated on both sides where river bisected.

Adjacent areas are (from north clockwise): Bang Phun in its district, Prachathipat in Thanyaburi district and Khu Khot in Lam Luk Ka district, Si Kan in Don Mueang district of Bangkok, and Ban Mai in its district, respectively.

Lak Hok is 5 km (3.1 mi) from the city of Pathum Thani, 32 km (19.9 mi) from Bangkok, with a total area of 11.7 km^{2} (about 4.5 sq mi).

== Demography ==
The area has a total population of 21,704 (10,242 men, 11,462 women) in 11,588 households. The average density is 1,855.04 people per km^{2}.

The local population is engaged in a variety of occupations, including agriculture, employment, civil service, and trading.

== Administration ==
The area is governed by the Lak Hok Sub-District Municipality.

Lak Hok is further divided into seven administrative mubans (village)

No.	Name	Thai
1.	Khlong Khu Klang	คลองคูกลาง
2.	Khlong Khwang Thung	คลองกวางตุ้ง
3.	Khlong Prem Prachakon	คลองเปรมประชากร
4.	Khlong Rangsit Prayurasakdi	คลองรังสิตประยูรศักดิ์
5.	Khlong Rangsit	คลองรังสิต
6.	Khlong Sip Sok	คลองสิบศอก
7.	Khlong Pream	คลองเปรม

== Education ==
There are three government schools, four private schools. Rangsit University (RSU) is an only local higher education institution.

== Houses of worship ==
- Wat Rangsit Buddhist Temple
- Wat Na Wong Buddhist Temple
- Chao Phor Somboon Joss House

== Neighbouring places ==
- Mueang Ek Village
- Rajamangala University of Technology Thanyaburi

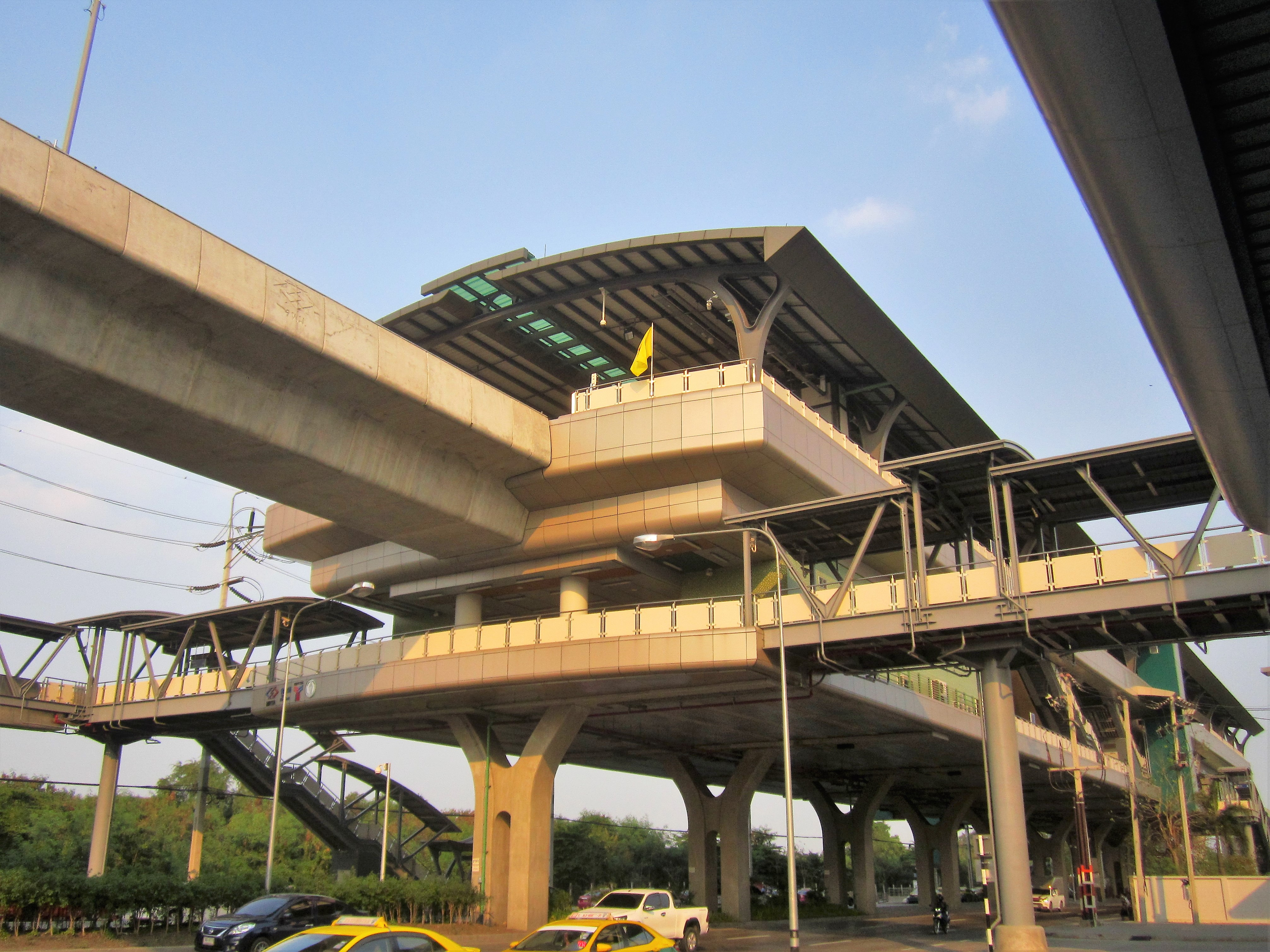
Nearby Khu Khot BTS station

== Transportation ==
The transportation condition of Lak Hok is convenient as it is an urban area close to Bangkok. The sub-district is crossed by the SRT Dark Red Line of the State Railway of Thailand (SRT) with local station, Lak Hok (Rangsit University), which opened for the first day on August 2, 2021. In addition, Lak Hok is also accessible by the Khu Khot station of the BTS Skytrain in the vicinity of Khu Khot.

The sub-district was also served by Lak Hok railway halt (27.61 km or 17.2 mi from Hua Lamphong railway station), whose Northern and Northeastern Lines passes through the area. But the railway halt, which located straddling between Lak Hok and Khu Khot (rail tracks are borderline) and paralleled by Kamphaeng Phet 6 Road, was permanently deactivated since September 15, 2020 along with two consecutive railway halts, due to replacements by the SRT Dark Red Line.

There are 33 roads in the municipality, eight of which are registered as highways.
