= Kalasin University =

- มหาวิทยาลัยกาฬสินธุ์
- Former names: Preceding institutions: Kalasin Rajabhat University; Rajamangala University of Technology Isan, Kalasin Campus
- Motto: ความรู้สร้างคุณค่า ภูมิปัญญาสร้างสังคม (RTGS: Khwamru Sang Khunkha Phumpanya Sang Sangkhom, transl. Knowledge creates value, wisdom builds society.)
- Type: Public university
- Established: September 9, 2015
- Founder: 61st Cabinet of Thailand
- Affiliations: Ministry of Higher Education, Science, Research and Innovation
- Chairperson: Withun Simachokdi
- President: Suphan Sodsoon
- Royal conferrer: Sirindhorn on behalf of the King
- Academic staff: 307 (As of 2026)
- Total staff: 573 (As of 2026)
- Students: 4,433 (As of 2025)
- Undergraduates: 3,991 (As of 2025)
- Postgraduates: 169 (As of 2025)
- Doctoral students: 57 (As of 2025)
- Other students: 216 (As of 2025)
- Location: Kalasin, Thailand; 16.6355083°N 103.7621114°E
- Colors: Leadwort blue
- Website: www.ksu.ac.th

Kalasin University (Thai: มหาวิทยาลัยกาฬสินธุ์, RTGS: Mahawitthayalai Kalasin; KSU) is a government university located in Kalasin Province. It was established in 2015 from the merger of the Kalasin Rajabhat University and the Kalasin Campus of Rajamangala University of Technology Isan.

== History ==
Kalasin University was established regarding the Kalasin University Act. 2015 which was announced in Royal Thai Government Gazette volume 132, section 86 A, issued on September 8, 2015. It stated the combination between Rajamangala University of Technology Isan, Kalasin Campus and Kalasin Rajabhat University to be Kalasin University which is the juristic person and government section operating under the law of Budgetary Means and Office of Higher Education Commission. Regarding section 6 of Kalasin University Act 2015, the university is the educational institute providing knowledge and expertise in profession and advanced professions with the purposes of providing education, promoting research for developing knowledge and technology, providing academic services for local communities and society, providing educational opportunities for people, preserving religious, arts, cultures, and sports, supporting the government activities, participating in local development, and preserving environment.

== Symbol of Kalasin University ==
=== Emblem of Kalasin University ===
Kalasin University’s logo and meaning :

1. The top of Sema (sculptured tablet stone) is derived from three shapes as explained below :
  1. The top of the Yakhu pagoda, the holy pagoda of Kalasin province, symbolizes to the wisdom and morality which are the sublime of human being.
  2. Sema (Sculptured tablet stone) which is the identity of Kalasin province refers to the civilization, greatness, religious and arts.
  3. Candle flame refers to the brightness, knowledge, wisdom, and morality.
2. Together palms refers to integrations of two universities which are Rajamangala University of Technology Isan, Kalasin Campus and Kalasin Rajabhat University.
3. Drop of water refers to the fertilization of Kalasin province.
4. Three levels of candle flame refer to the integration of sciences, technology, and local wisdom regarding the determination and missions of Kalasin University focusing on develop local community and society.

=== Symbolic Color ===
Symbolic color of Kalasin University is leadwort blue which refers to the fertilization, knowledge and wisdom, independence, inspiration, and creativity. Leadwort blue also means the graduate who is patient, determined, calm, and polite.

=== Symbolic Tree ===
The tree of Kalasin University is Ma Haad or Artocarpus lacucha

== Directory of President of Kalasin University ==
- 2015 – 6 March 2016: Assistant Professor Noppon Kosirayotin (acting)
- 6 March 2016 – 12 June 2016: Associate Professor Jirapan Huaysan (acting)
- 13 June 2016 – 2025: Associate Professor Jirapan Huaysan
- 28 August 2025 – present: Associate Professor Suphan Sodsoon
