= Nakhon Phanom =

Nakhon Phanom นครพนม
- Town
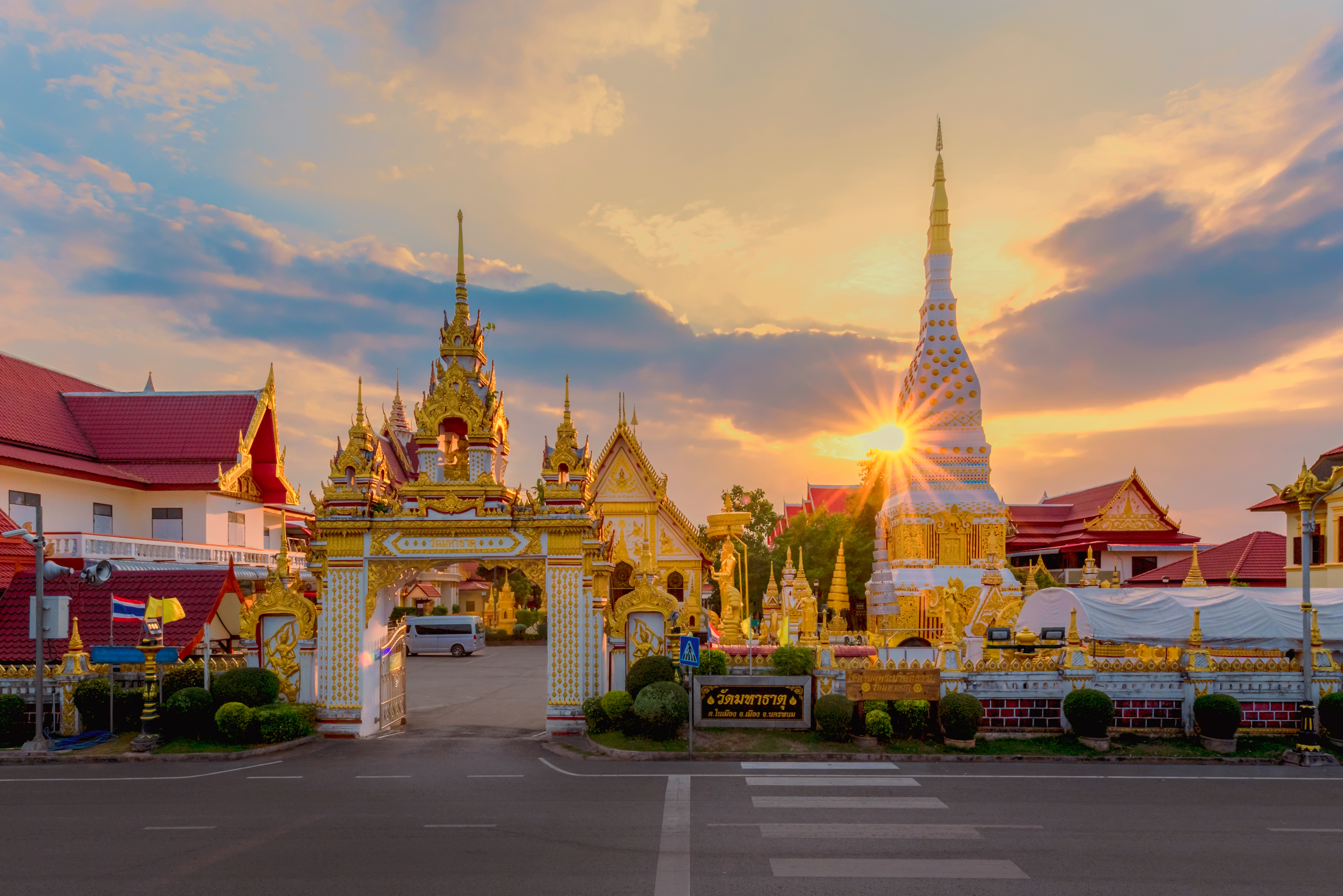
- Wat Mahathat Phanom

- Location within Thailand
- Coordinates: 17°24′25″N 104°46′51″E
- Country: Thailand
- Provinces: Nakhon Phanom Province
- Amphoe: Mueang Nakhon Phanom District
- Elevation: 149 m (489 ft)

Population (2006)
  - Total: 27,591
- Time zone: UTC+7 (ICT)
- Climate: Aw

Nakhon Phanom (Thai: นครพนม, pronounced [ná(ʔ).kʰɔ̄ːn pʰā.nōm]; Northeastern Thai: นครพนม, pronounced [nà(ʔ).kʰɔ᷇ːn pʰā.no᷇m]) is a town (thesaban mueang) in northeastern Thailand, capital of Nakhon Phanom Province. The town covers tambons Nai Mueang and Nong Saeng and parts of tambons At Samat and Nong Yat, all in Mueang Nakhon Phanom District. As of 2006, it had a population of 27,591. This town is located 736 kilometres (457 mi) northeast of Bangkok.

== Geography ==
Nakhon Phanom is on the right (west) bank of the Mekong River. The Laotian town of Thakhek lies on the other side of the Mekong. A 3 kilometres (1.9 mi) long lake lies to the west of the city. The towns are joined by the Third Thai–Lao Friendship Bridge.

== Climate ==
Nakhon Phanom has a tropical savanna climate (Köppen climate classification Aw). Winters are dry and warm. Temperatures rise until April, which is hot with the average daily maximum at 35.1 °C (95.2 °F). The monsoon season runs from May through October, with heavy rain and somewhat cooler temperatures during the day, although nights remain warm.

Climate data for Nakhon Phanom (1991–2020, extremes 1953-present)
Month	Jan	Feb	Mar	Apr	May	Jun	Jul	Aug	Sep	Oct	Nov	Dec	Year
Record high °C (°F)	36.3 (97.3)	38.9 (102.0)	41.3 (106.3)	43.0 (109.4)	41.4 (106.5)	37.5 (99.5)	38.4 (101.1)	36.5 (97.7)	36.0 (96.8)	35.4 (95.7)	36.4 (97.5)	35.5 (95.9)	43.0 (109.4)
Mean daily maximum °C (°F)	29.6 (85.3)	31.5 (88.7)	33.9 (93.0)	35.1 (95.2)	34.0 (93.2)	32.5 (90.5)	31.5 (88.7)	31.3 (88.3)	31.9 (89.4)	32.1 (89.8)	31.3 (88.3)	29.3 (84.7)	32.0 (89.6)
Daily mean °C (°F)	22.6 (72.7)	24.5 (76.1)	27.4 (81.3)	29.1 (84.4)	28.7 (83.7)	28.1 (82.6)	27.5 (81.5)	27.2 (81.0)	27.4 (81.3)	26.8 (80.2)	25.1 (77.2)	22.7 (72.9)	26.4 (79.6)
Mean daily minimum °C (°F)	16.9 (62.4)	18.9 (66.0)	22.3 (72.1)	24.4 (75.9)	25.0 (77.0)	25.0 (77.0)	24.8 (76.6)	24.5 (76.1)	24.2 (75.6)	22.6 (72.7)	20.0 (68.0)	17.1 (62.8)	22.1 (71.9)
Record low °C (°F)	1.8 (35.2)	8.0 (46.4)	8.2 (46.8)	16.3 (61.3)	17.0 (62.6)	21.4 (70.5)	21.8 (71.2)	21.5 (70.7)	20.5 (68.9)	14.7 (58.5)	7.2 (45.0)	4.1 (39.4)	1.8 (35.2)
Average precipitation mm (inches)	4.1 (0.16)	21.6 (0.85)	61.2 (2.41)	99.9 (3.93)	264.8 (10.43)	397.0 (15.63)	564.3 (22.22)	536.7 (21.13)	297.2 (11.70)	78.3 (3.08)	7.5 (0.30)	5.3 (0.21)	2,337.9 (92.04)
Average precipitation days (≥ 1.0 mm)	0.9	2.2	4.9	6.9	14.1	18.9	21.6	22.1	14.8	6.0	0.9	0.6	113.8
Average relative humidity (%)	66.6	65.1	65.3	67.8	76.9	83.1	85.7	87.0	83.1	74.1	68.7	66.6	74.1
Mean monthly sunshine hours	247.1	224.2	215.2	216.2	185.6	144.4	126.8	119.3	147.0	214.7	235.4	246.2	2,322.1
Source 1: World Meteorological Organization
Source 2: Office of Water Management and Hydrology, Royal Irrigation Department (sun 1981–2010)(extremes)

== Transportation ==
Route 212 runs from Nong Khai along the Mekong River through Nakhon Phanom to Mukdahan, and then south to Ubon Ratchathani. Route 22 leads west through Sakon Nakhon to Udon Thani.

Nakhon Phanom is served by Nakhon Phanom Airport, 13 kilometres (8.1 mi) west of downtown.

== Education ==
The town is home to Nakhon Phanom University, which was formed in 2005 by the merger of several local schools, including the former Nakhon Phanom Rajabhat University.

== Sports ==
Nakhon Phanom is home to the Madgoat Basketball Club, which plays in the Thailand Basketball League, the country's highest division.
