= Hiroichi Sakai =

Japanese politician (1929–2021)

- 坂井 弘一

Member of the House of Representatives
- In office 27 December 1969 – 18 June 1993
- Preceded by: Kikuichirō Yamaguchi
- Succeeded by: Hiroyoshi Nishi
- Constituency: Wakayama 1st

Personal details
- Born: 21 March 1929 (age 97) Minabe, Wakayama, Japan
- Died: 22 November 2021 (aged 92) Kainan, Wakayama, Japan
- Party: Kōmeitō
- Education: Osaka Institute of Technology

Hiroichi Sakai (Japanese: 坂井弘一; Sakai Hiroichi; 21 March 1929 – 22 November 2021) was a Japanese politician. A member of the Komeito party, he served in the House of Representatives from 1969 to 1993.
