= Rajabhat University system =

Group of Thai public universities

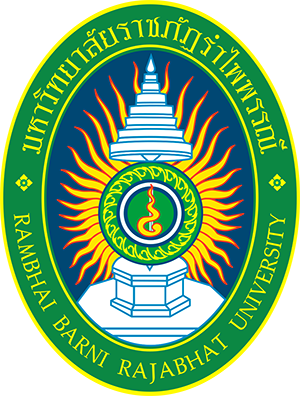
Emblem of Rajabhat University system

The Rajabhat Universities (มหาวิทยาลัยราชภัฏ, RTGS: Mahawitthayalai Ratchaphat) are a group of public universities in Thailand that were originally founded as teacher training colleges.

In 1995, the Thai government elevated existing teacher training colleges to so-called Rajabhat Institutes. The transformation expanded the legal mandate of these institutions, granting them the authority to confer postgraduate degrees, including doctorates. Rajabhat Institutes were further transformed to Rajabhat Universities in 2005, allowing the institutions to function as independent universities.

There are currently 38 Rajabhat Universities. They are generally considered easier to gain admission to than the traditional public universities. Most Rajabhat Universities offer graduate degrees, some even to the doctoral level. Enrollments have been shrinking. As of 2018, students numbered 540,000, down from 600,000.

== Name ==
The Royal Institute Dictionary defines ราชภัฏ as "civil servant" (ข้าราชการ). The word is derived from Sanskrit rājabhaṭa (राजभट), a combination of rāja (meaning king) and bhaṭa (meaning soldier or servant).

== List of Rajabhat Universities ==
=== Bangkok group ===
- Bansomdejchaopraya Rajabhat University
- Chandrakasem Rajabhat University
- Dhonburi Rajabhat University
- Phranakhon Rajabhat University
- Suan Dusit Rajabhat University (since 2015 change to Suan Dusit University)
- Suan Sunandha Rajabhat University

=== Northern group ===
- Chiang Mai Rajabhat University
- Chiang Rai Rajabhat University
- Kamphaeng Phet Rajabhat University
- Lampang Rajabhat University
- Nakhon Sawan Rajabhat University
- Phetchabun Rajabhat University
- Pibulsongkram Rajabhat University (Phitsanulok)
- Uttaradit Rajabhat University

=== Northeastern group ===
- Buriram Rajabhat University
- Chaiyaphum Rajabhat University
- Kalasin Rajabhat University (since 2016 combined to Kalasin University)
- Loei Rajabhat University
- Rajabhat Maha Sarakham University
- Nakhon Ratchasima Rajabhat University
- Roi Et Rajabhat University
- Sakon Nakhon Rajabhat University
- Sisaket Rajabhat University
- Surindra Rajabhat University
- Ubon Ratchathani Rajabhat University
- Udon Thani Rajabhat University
- Nakhon Phanom Rajabhat University (since 2005 combined to Nakhon Phanom University)

=== Central group ===
- Phranakhon Si Ayutthaya Rajabhat University (Ayutthaya)
- Muban Chom Bung Rajabhat University (Chom Bung, Ratchaburi)
- Kanchanaburi Rajabhat University
- Nakhon Pathom Rajabhat University
- Phetchaburi Rajabhat University
- Rajabhat Rajanagarindra University (Chachoengsao)
- Rambhai Barni Rajabhat University (Chanthaburi)
- Thepsatri Rajabhat University (Lopburi)
- Valaya Alongkorn Rajabhat University (Khlong Luang, Pathum Thani)

=== Southern group ===
- Nakhon Si Thammarat Rajabhat University
- Phuket Rajabhat University
- Songkhla Rajabhat University
- Suratthani Rajabhat University
- Yala Rajabhat University
