= Hiroyoshi Nishi =

Japanese politician

- 西 博義
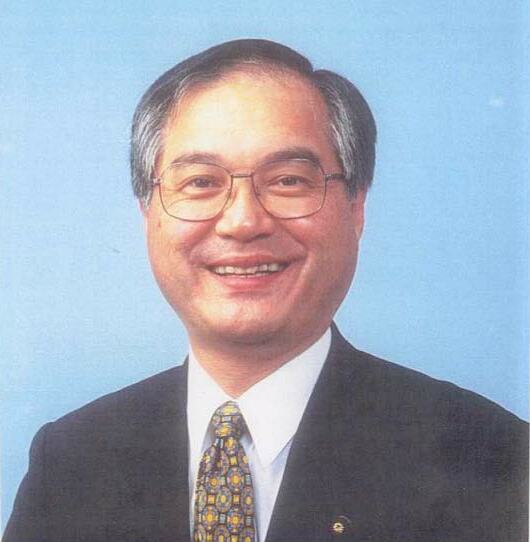

Member of the House of Representatives
- In office 18 July 1993 – 16 November 2012
- Preceded by: Hiroichi Sakai
- Succeeded by: Multi-member district
- Constituency: Wakayama 1st (1993–1996); Kinki PR (1996–2012)

Personal details
- Born: 3 October 1948 (age 78) Hirogawa, Wakayama, Japan
- Party: Komeito
- Other political affiliations: CGP (1993–1994); NFP (1994–1998); LP (1998)
- Education: University of Tokushima

Hiroyoshi Nishi (西 博義, Nishi Hiroyoshi; born 3 October 1948) is a Japanese politician of the New Komeito Party, a member of the House of Representatives in the Diet (national legislature). A native of Arida District, Wakayama he attended University of Tokushima as both an undergraduate and graduate student and taught at a school in Wakayama from 1973 to 1992. In 1993, he was elected for the first time.
