= PROITERES =

Japanese satellite

- Mission type: Technology demonstrator
- Operator: Osaka Institute of Technology
- COSPAR ID: 2012-047B
- SATCAT no.: 38756
- Website: Official Page

Spacecraft properties
- Launch mass: 15 kg (33 lb)

Start of mission
- Launch date: 04:23, September 9, 2012 (UTC)
- Rocket: PSLV-CA
- Launch site: Satish Dhawan FLP

Orbital parameters
- Reference system: Geocentric
- Regime: Sun Synchronous
- Perigee altitude: 566 km
- Apogee altitude: 566 km
- Inclination: 97,9°
- Period: 97 min

PROITERES or Project of OIT Electric-Rocket-Engine Onboard Small Space Ship (Japanese: 大阪工業大学 電気推進ロケットエンジン搭載小型スペースシッププロジェクト) is a satellite launched by ISRO in 2012 for Osaka Institute of Technology (OIT). This small (15 kg) boxlike system, with solar panels on the hull, is the testbench for the 4.4 W Pulsed Plasma Thruster operating on the microsatellite platform. The total power budget of the satellite is 15 watt.

PROITERES stands for "Project of Osaka Institute of Technology Electric-Rocket-Engine onboard Small Space Ship". The project started at the Osaka Institute of Technology in 2007. Its main mission was powered flight of a nano-satellite in orbit using electrothermal pulsed plasma thrusters (PPTs), alongside observation of Japan's Kansai district with a high-resolution camera. Researchers described the aim as the first powered flight of a micro-satellite by an electric thruster anywhere in the world.

== Project description and goals ==
PROITERES' secondary goals, as stated by the manufacturer, are:

- Experiments of two-way radio signal propagation characteristics using amateur radio (430 MHz) band.
- Communication tests of satellite communication technology using off-the-shelf consumer-grade components.
- Tracking and communicating by amateur radio users around the world.
- Monitoring with a high-resolution camera the Yodogawa basin near Osaka and other parts of Kansai District.

It is equipped with 3-axis magnetic torquers and gyro-sensors for attitude control (orientation), a magnetic sensor on the boom, a solar sensor, and the Complementary Metal Oxide Semiconductor (CMOS) visible spectrum camera with a five-lens system and a focal length of 85.3 mm and a f number of 3.6.

== Failure ==
As of 2013, PROITERES does not respond to any ground commands, although still broadcasting telemetry data. According to the PROITERES development team report on 17 January 2014 at JAXA annual symposium, the PROITERES had a design error resulting in the flight computer engaged in a boot loop. The root cause of the boot loop was the electromagnetic incompatibility issue, resulting in a reset signal being generated if power-up ramp rate of the flight computer is high enough.

The Osaka Institute of Technology team abandoned attempts to restore communications with PROITERES satellite and proceeded with development of the PROITERES-2 design.

== See also ==
- Miniaturized satellite
