= Lak Hok (Rangsit University) station =

SRT Dark Red Line Station, located in Lak hok, Pathum thani, Thailand

Lak Hok (Rangsit University) หลักหก (มหาวิทยาลัยรังสิต)
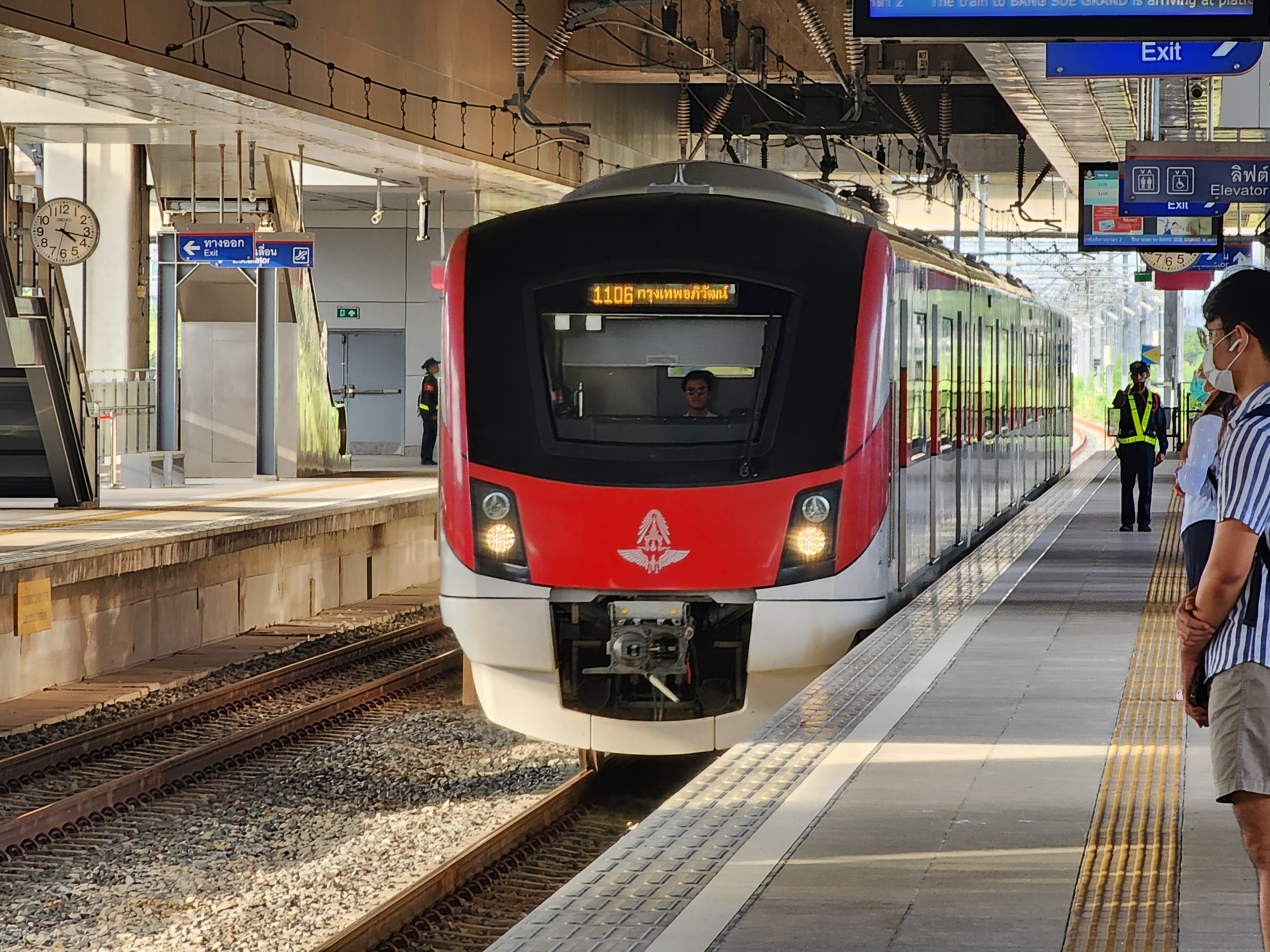

General information
- Location: Lak Hok, Mueang Pathum Thani District, Pathum Thani, Thailand; Pathum Thani Province; Thailand
- Coordinates: 13.9656°N 100.6054°E
- Operator: State Railway of Thailand
- Manager: Ministry of Transport
- Platforms: 2
- Tracks: 2

Construction
- Structure type: Elevated
- Parking: Yes
- Cycle facilities: Yes

Other information
- Station code: RN09

History
- Opened: 1893 (Halt); 2 August 2021 (SRT Red Lines)
- Closed: 15 September 2020 (Halt)
- Electrified: 25 kV 50 Hz AC overhead catenary

Services
Preceding station	SRT Red Lines	Following station
Don Mueang towards Krung Thep Aphiwat	Dark Red Line	Rangsit Terminus
Location

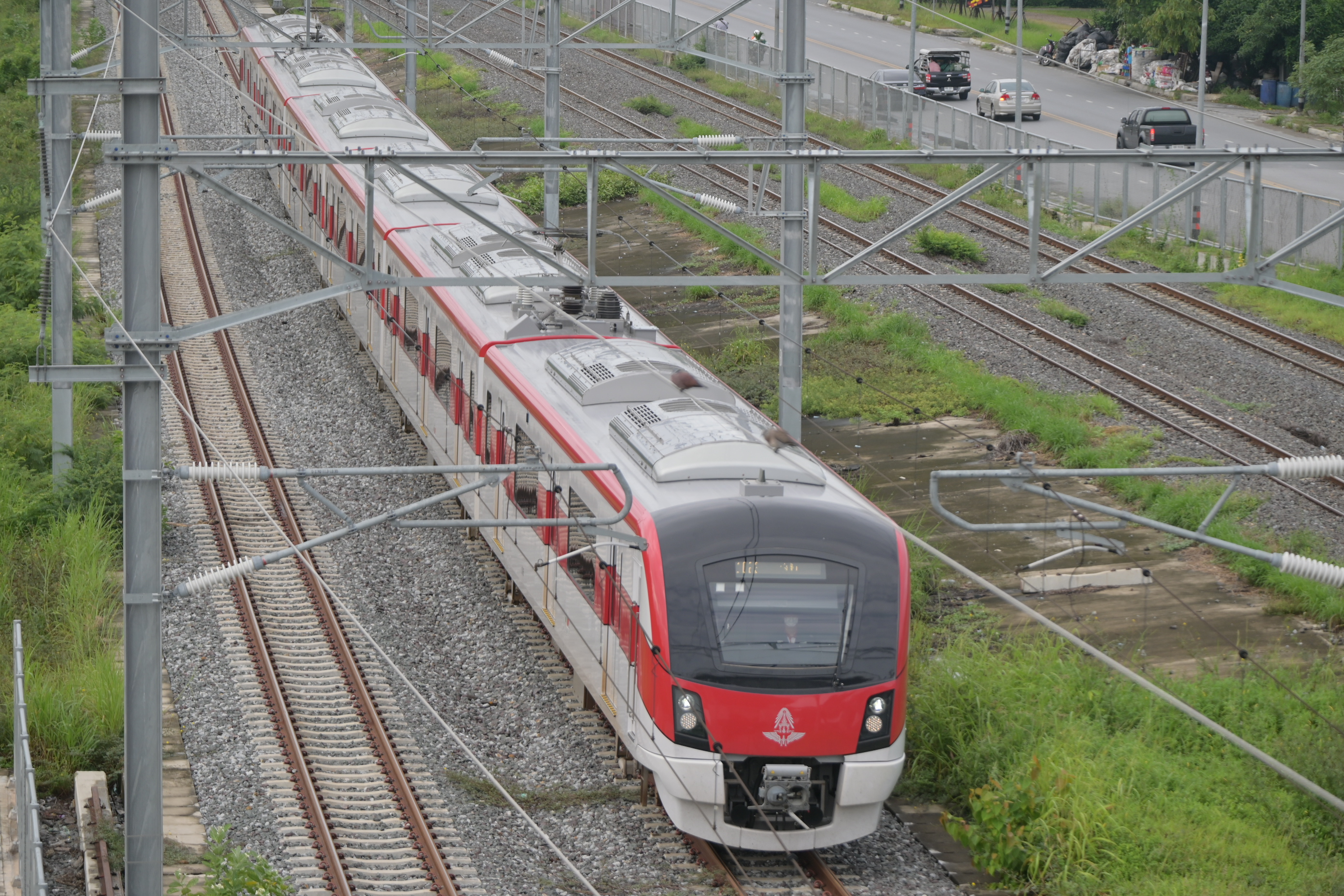
A Hitachi-built SRT 1000 series approaching Lak Hok (Rangsit University) station on the dark red line.

Lak Hok (Rangsit University) Station (Thai: สถานีหลักหก (มหาวิทยาลัยรังสิต)) is a railway station in Mueang Pathum Thani District, Pathum Thani Province. It serves the SRT Dark Red Line.

== History ==
Lak Hok opened in 1898 as a railway station as part of Thailand's first railway between Bangkok and Ayutthaya. It was reduced to a railway halt during sometime in the 20th century and remained as a ground-level railway halt on the State Railway of Thailand's Northern and Northeastern Main Line which primarily served commuter trains. The halt officially closed on 15 September 2020 in preparation for the opening of the Dark Red Line.

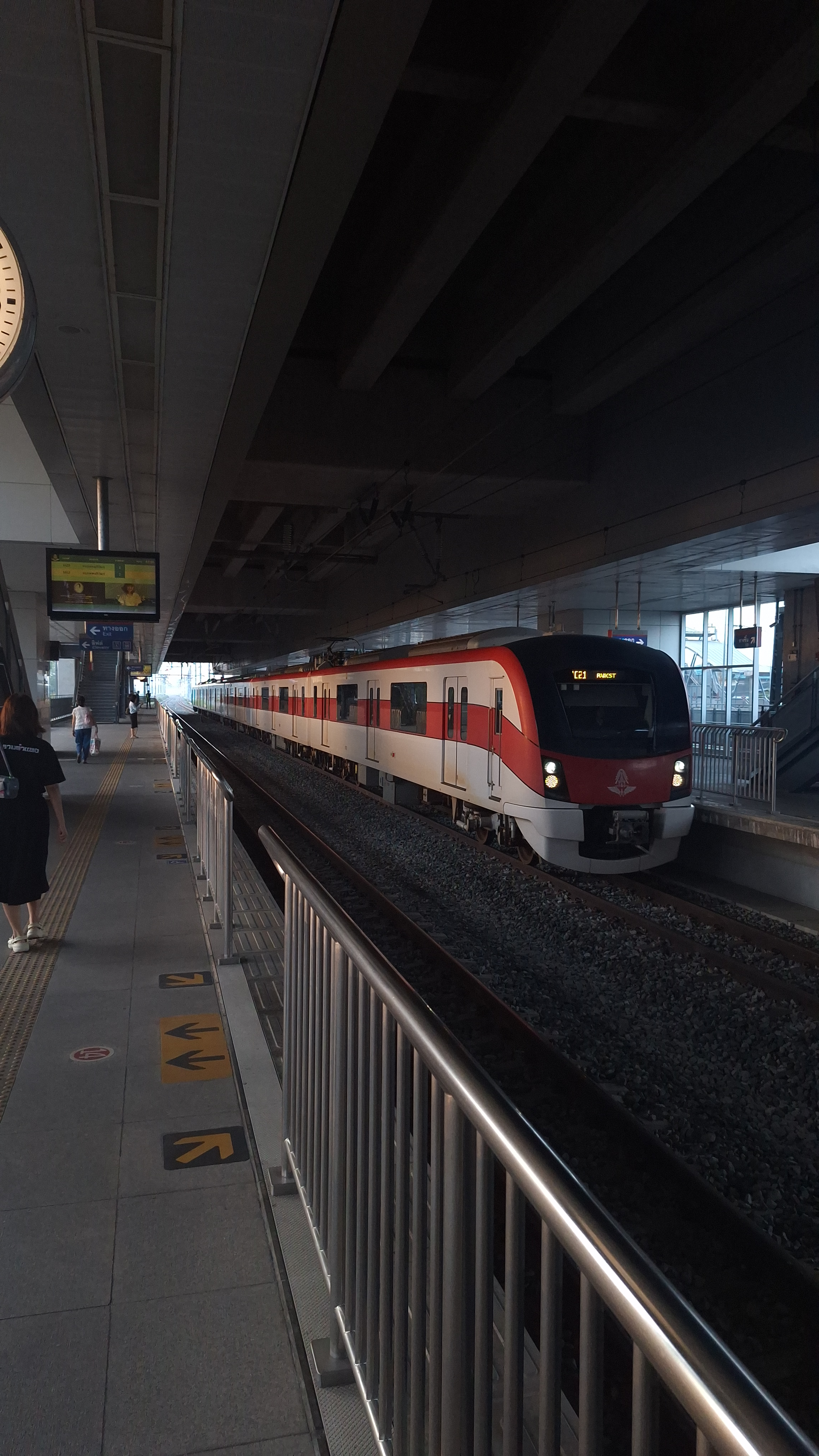
6 car train arriving at Lak Hok (Rangsit University) station

The new Lak Hok station was built in 2013 during the construction of the SRT Dark Red Line. It was initially named only as Lak Hok Station to reflect the existing halt, but "Rangsit University" was added afterwards to increase public awareness about its location close to the Rangsit University main campus. The station opened on 2 August 2021 following the opening of the line.
