= Uttaradit Rajabhat University =

University in Uttaradit, Thailand

Coordinates: 17°37′58″N 100°05′35″E

- มหาวิทยาลัยราชภัฏอุตรดิตถ์
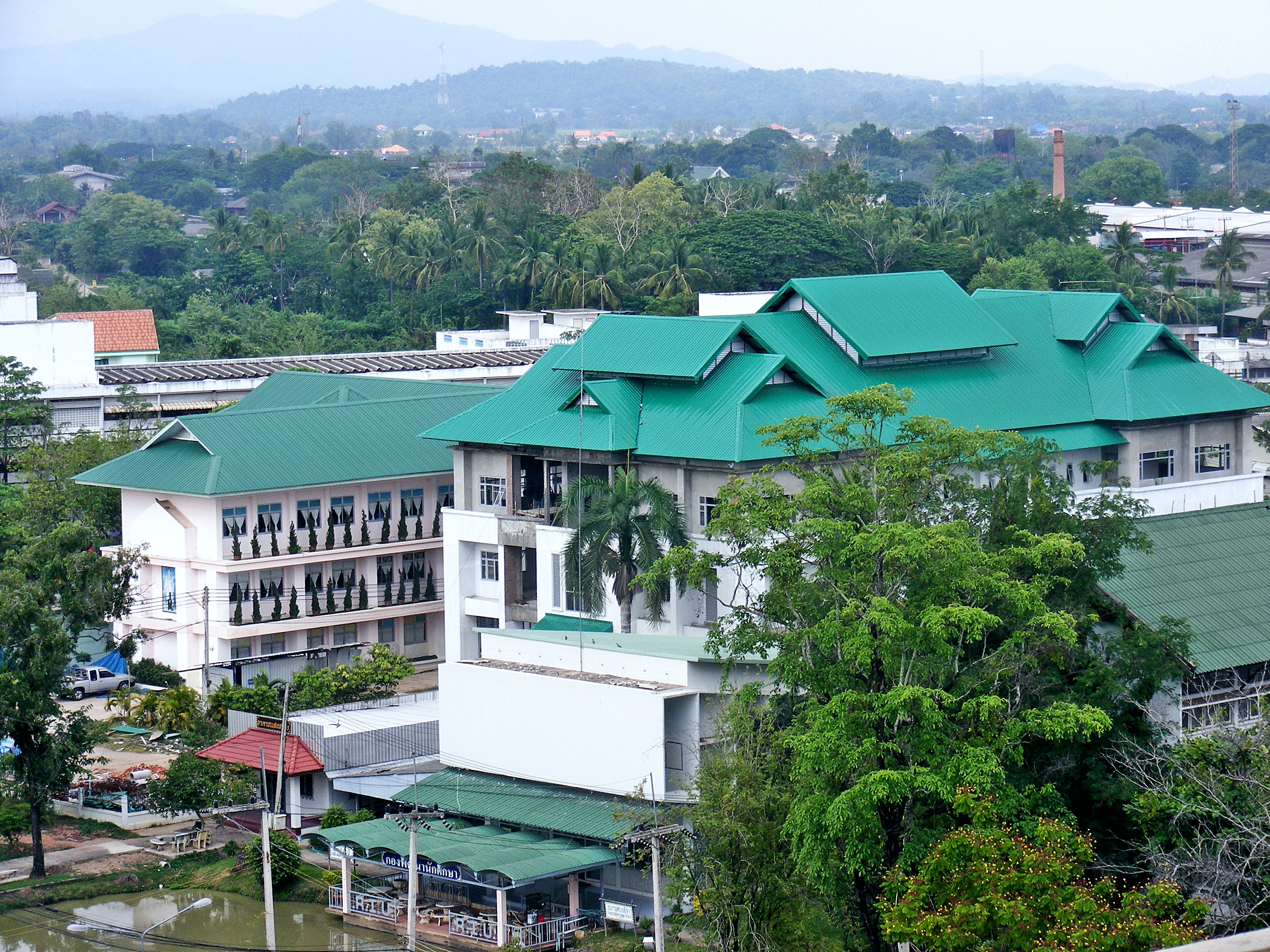
- Type: Public
- Established: 1 August 1936
- President: Asst. Prof. Sitthisai Hansombut
- Location: Uttaradit, Thailand
- Campus: Uttaradit (Main Campus)
- Colours: Green - yellow
- Website: www.uru.ac.th

Uttaradit Rajabhat University (URU.) (Thai: มหาวิทยาลัยราชภัฏอุตรดิตถ์) (URU) is a Thai public university under the Rajabhat system. The campus is in Uttaradit, a small city north of Bangkok. It was established in 1936 as the Uttaradit Teachers College. Uttaradit Rajabhat University is the first university of Uttaradit Province.

On 14 June 2004, all Rajabhat institutes nationwide were upgraded the king, who signed the Rajabhat University Act, B.E 2547 (2004), which was announced in the Royal Gazette for implementation from 15 June 2004. This promoted all Rajabhat institutes to become Rajabhat Universities, a closely knit group of Thai universities dedicated to the preservation of Thai heritage and subject to the National Tertiary Education Commission of the Ministry of Education.
