= Rajamangala University of Technology Lanna =

University in Thailand

- Motto: Hard working good people who specialized technology
- Type: Public
- Established: 2005
- President: Assoc. Prof Dr Numyoot Songthanapitak
- Royal conferrer: Maha Chakri Sirindhorn, Princess Royal of Thailand
- Students: 22,725 (2009)
- Location: Chiang Mai, Thailand; 18.810334°N 98.952673°E
- Campus: 6
- Colors: Hazel
- Nickname: RMUTL
- Website: www.rmutl.ac.th

Rajamangala University of Technology Lanna (RMUTL, Thai: มหาวิทยาลัยเทคโนโลยีราชมงคลล้านนา) is a science and technology university in Chiang Mai Province, northern Thailand. It offers vocational certificate, advanced vocational certificate, undergraduate, and master's degrees.

== History ==
RMUTL was founded in 1957 under a royal charter granted by His Majesty the King Bhumibol Adulyadej under the name Vocational Institute. In 1975, it was considered a campus of the Institute of Technology and Vocational Education and it used to be under the name of " Northern Technical Institution, in Chiang Mai, Thailand. In 1988 it was named Rajamangala Institute of Technology (RIT), Northern Campus by His Majesty the King. To serve the needs of people in Thailand and other countries and to meet international standards, RIT developed its administration structure and education management and became Rajamangala University of Technology (RMUT) in 2003. RMUT consists of nine universities with six campuses in the north of Thailand: Chiang Mai, Chiang Rai, Lampang, Tak, Phitsanulok Province, and Nan.

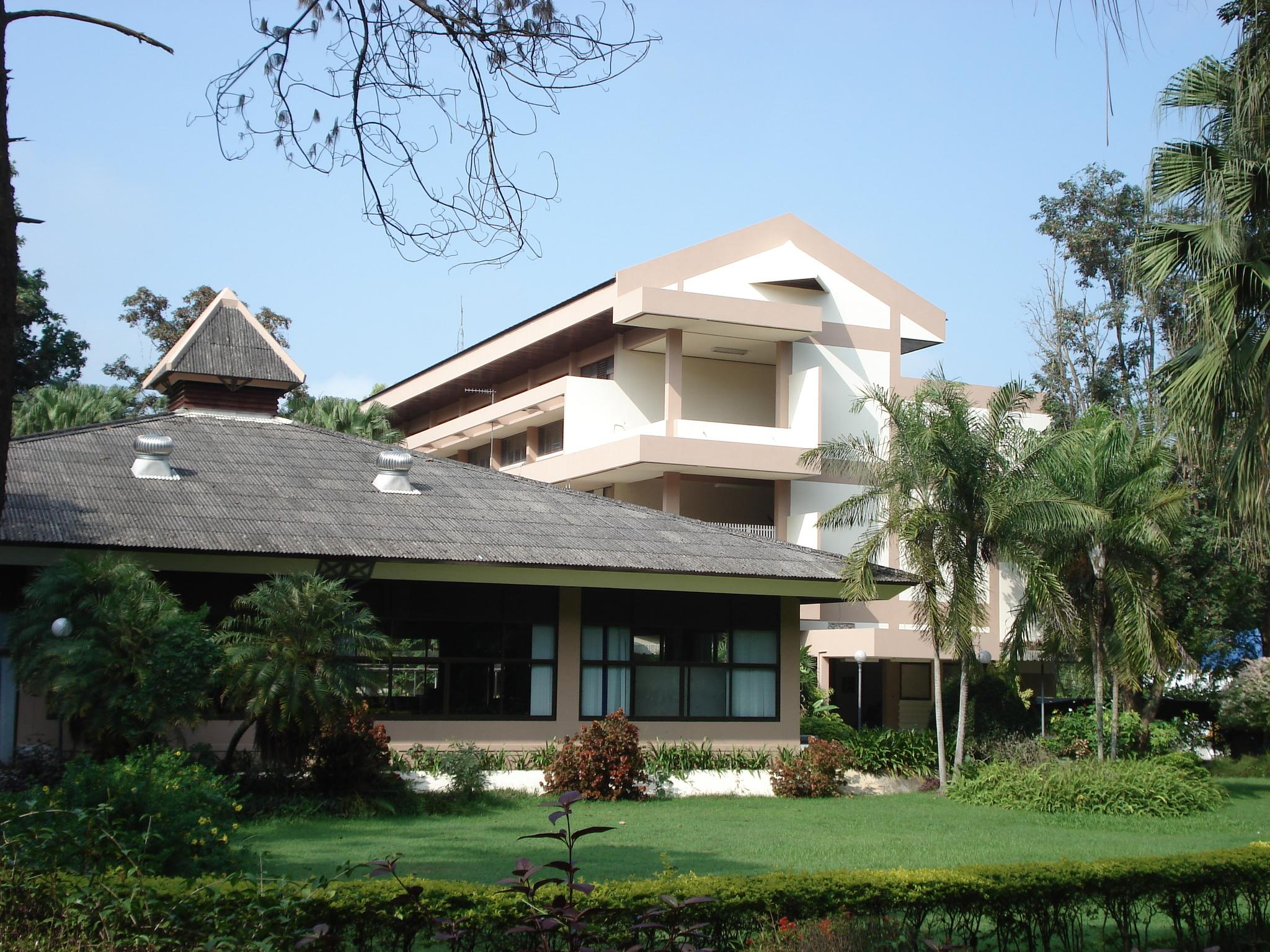
Institute of Agricultural Technology

== Faculty ==
- Faculty of Business Administration and Liberal Arts
- Faculty of Agricultural Science and Technology
- Faculty of Engineering
- Faculty of Arts and Architecture
- College of Technology and Interdisciplinary

== Student union ==
Rajamangala University of Technology Lanna Students’ Union is run by the students. It provides artistic, cultural, sporting, recreational, and educational activities. Each campus has a student union.

=== Activities ===
- Wai Khru Ceremony (Thai: พิธีไหว้ครู) (to show respect to teachers)
- The Social Development Camp
- Rajamangala University Games
- Lanna Heritage

== Application for admission ==
=== Application for the Diploma program ===
- Quota system (for students in 17 northern provinces)
- Direct admission system

=== Application for the undergraduate program ===
- Quota system (for students in 17 northern provinces)
- Direct admission system
- Entrance system

== Education and research scholarships ==
- Income Contingent Loans: students obtain a loan for school fees and pay it back after they graduate and have a salary.
- General Scholarship is a scholarship is donated from many places, such as the student alumni, cooperative stores, public donations, bank, and other stores.
- The scholarship of Commission on Higher Education and the cooperative of International Science and Technology Development Agency Northern Network.
- The scholarship International Association for the Exchange of student for Technical Experience.

== Facilities ==
- Academic Resources Center provides reading and audio-visual materials to support learning. The Academic Resources Center consists of the library, education technology division, and self–access learning center.
- Arts and Culture Center preserves and promotes arts and culture including cooperation with the Central Arts and Culture Center.
- Language Center at Lampang Campus offers teaching to its students, staff, and the wider community to develop their English through computer-assisted instruction (CAI).
- Chulalongkorn University Test of English Proficiency (CU – TEP) Center: Rajamangala University of Technology cooperates with Chulalongkorn University in providing the test of English proficiency to measure students, staff, and interested people's abilities to use English.
- Northern CNC Technology Center at Northern and Tak campuses provides information on computer numerically controlled milling machines (CNC machines).

== Cooperation network ==
=== Australia ===
- University of South Australia, Australia
- Massey University, New Zealand

=== Asia ===
- Zhen Jen University, People's Republic of China
- Guangxi Normal University, People's Republic of China
- Guilin University of Technology, People's Republic of China
- University of Electro Communications, Japan
- Central Luzon State University, The Philippines
- Kolej University Teknikal Kebangsaan Malaysia (KUTKM), Malaysia
- University Collegye of Technology Tun Hussein Onn (KUITHO), Malaysia
- Kolej Universiti Kejuruteraan Utara Malaysia (KUKTM), Malaysia

=== United States ===
- Oklahoma State University, USA
