= Rajamangala University of Technology =

University system in Thailand

Rajamangala University of Technology (Thai: มหาวิทยาลัยเทคโนโลยีราชมงคล) (RMUT) is one of the university systems in Thailand. It has nine universities providing undergraduate and graduate level education. It was elevated to university status in 2005. Before that it was known as Rajamangala Institute of Technology (สถาบันเทคโนโลยีราชมงคล).

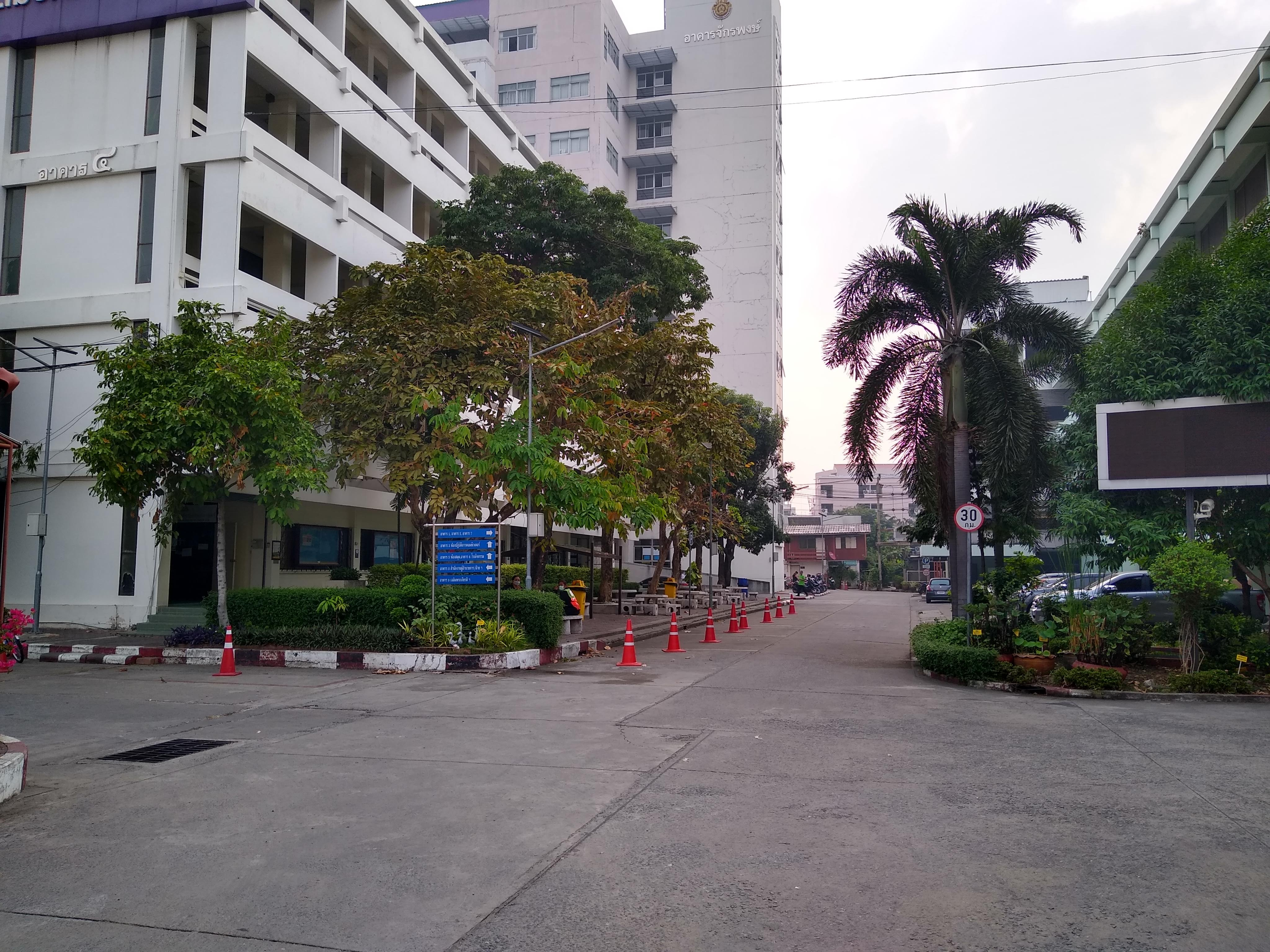
Rajamangala University of Technology Tawan-ok Chakrabongse Bhuvanarth Campus

In September 2016, Prime Minister Prayut Chan-o-cha invoked Section 44 of the interim charter allowing him to form a special panel to take over administration of Rajamangala University of Technology Tawan-ok as it was judged to be incapable of administering itself.

== Branches ==
The following is the list of state-run universities in Rajamangala University of Technology system. Most of them have several campuses.

- Rajamangala University of Technology Thanyaburi
  - RMUT (Khlong 6)
  - RMUT Thanyaburi Pathumthani Campus
- Rajamangala University of Technology Suvarnabhumi
  - RMUT Suvarnabhumi Nonthaburi Campus
  - RMUT Suvarnabhumi Phra Nakhon Si Ayutthaya Hantra Campus
  - RMUT Suvarnabhumi Phra Nakhon Si Ayutthaya Wasukri Campus
  - RMUT Suvarnabhumi Suphanburi Campus
- Rajamangala University of Technology Krung Thep
  - RMUT Krung Thep Bangkok Technical Campus
  - RMUT Krung Thep Bophit Phimuk Mahamek Campus
  - RMUT Krung Thep Phra Nakhon Tai Campus
- Rajamangala University of Technology Rattanakosin
  - RMUT Rattanakosin Salaya Campus
  - RMUT Rattanakosin Bophit Phimuk Chakkrawat Campus
  - RMUT Rattanakosin Pohchang Campus
  - RMUT Rattanakosin Wangklaikangwon Campus (near Hua Hin District)
- Rajamangala University of Technology Phra Nakhon
  - RMUT Phra Nakhon Thewet Campus
  - RMUT Phra Nakhon Chotiwet Campus
  - RMUT Phra Nakhon Bangkok Commerce Campus
  - RMUT Phra Nakhon Chumphonkhet Udomsak Campus
  - RMUT Phra Nakhon North Bangkok Campus
- Rajamangala University of Technology Tawan-ok
  - RMUT Tawan-ok Chakrabongse Bhuvanarth Campus
  - RMUT Tawan-ok Uthenthawai Campus
  - RMUT Tawan-ok Bangphra Campus
  - RMUT Tawan-ok Faculty of Agriculture at Bangphra
  - RMUT Tawan-ok Chanthaburi Campus
- Rajamangala University of Technology Lanna
  - RMUT Lanna Northern Campus
  - RMUT Lanna Chiang Rai Campus
  - RMUT Lanna Tak Campus
  - RMUT Lanna Phitsanulok Campus
  - RMUT Lanna Nan Campus
  - RMUT Lanna Lampang Campus
  - RMUT Lanna Lampang Agricultural Research and Training Center
- Rajamangala University of Technology Isan
  - RMUT Isan Nakhon Ratchasima Campus
  - RMUT Isan Khon Kaen Campus
  - RMUT Isan Kalasin Campus (since 2016 combined to Kalasin University)
  - RMUT Isan Surin Campus
  - RMUT Isan Sakon Nakhon Campus
  - RMUT Isan Roi Et establishing campus
  - RMUT Isan Sakon Nakhon Agricultural Research and Training Center
- Rajamangala University of Technology Srivijaya
  - RMUT Srivijaya Songkhla Campus
  - RMUT Srivijaya Nakhon Si Thammarat Campus
  - RMUT Srivijaya Faculty of Agriculture Nakhon Si Thammarat
  - RMUT Srivijaya Trang Campus
