= Liquid marbles =

Non-stick droplets

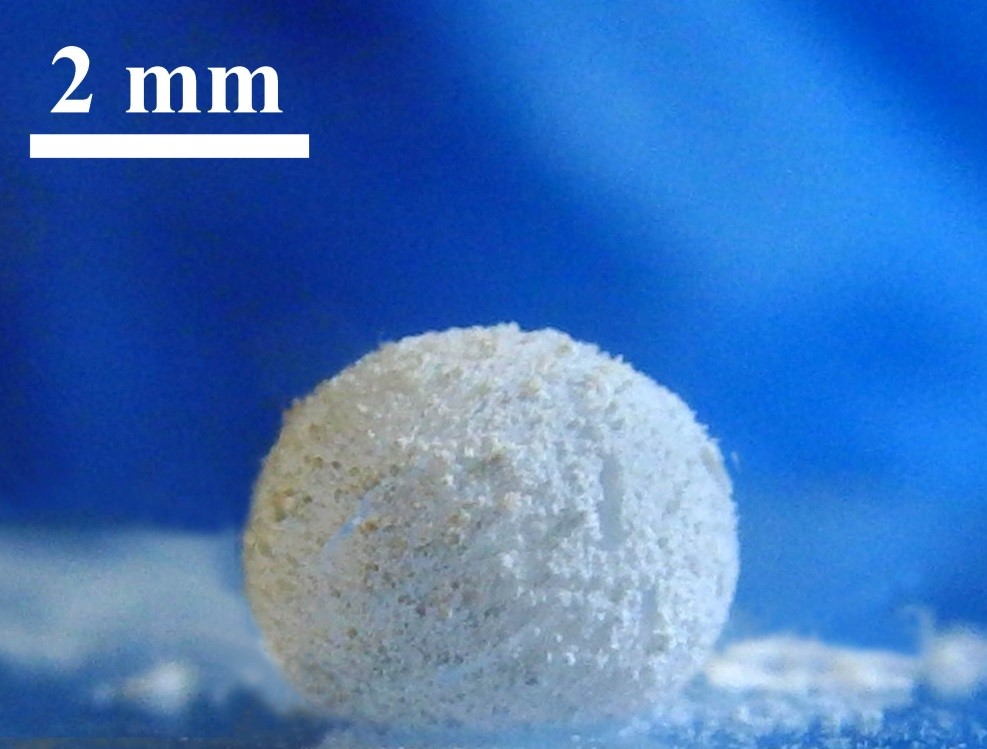
20 μL liquid marble coated with the Teflon powder

Liquid marbles are non-stick droplets (normally aqueous) wrapped by micro- or nano-metrically scaled hydrophobic, colloidal particles (Teflon, polyethylene, lycopodium powder, carbon black, etc.); representing a platform for a diversity of chemical and biological applications. Liquid marbles are also found naturally; aphids convert honeydew droplets into marbles. A variety of non-organic and organic liquids may be converted into liquid marbles. Liquid marbles demonstrate elastic properties and do not coalesce when bounced or pressed lightly. Liquid marbles demonstrate a potential as micro-reactors, micro-containers for growing micro-organisms and cells, micro-fluidics devices, and have even been used in unconventional computing. Liquid marbles remain stable on solid and liquid surfaces. Statics and dynamics of rolling and bouncing of liquid marbles were reported. Liquid marbles coated with poly-disperse and mono-disperse particles have been reported. Liquid marbles are not hermetically coated by solid particles but connected to the gaseous phase. Kinetics of the evaporation of liquid marbles has been investigated.

== Interfacial water marbles ==
Liquid marbles were first reported by P. Aussillous and D. Quere in 2001, who described a new method to construct portable water droplets in the atmospheric environment with hydrophobic coating on their surface to prevent the contact between water and the solid ground (Figure 1). Liquid marbles provide a new approach to transport liquid mass on the solid surface, which sufficiently transform the inconvenient glass containers into flexible, user-specified hydrophobic coating composed of powders of hydrophobic materials. Since then, the applications of liquid marbles in no-loss mass transport, microfluidics and microreactors have been extensively investigated. However, liquid marbles only reflect the water behavior at the solid-air interface, while there is no report on the water behavior at the liquid-liquid interface, as a result of the so-called coalescence cascade phenomenon.

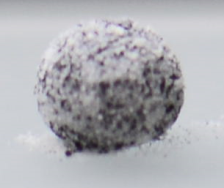
Figure 1. A liquid marble sitting on the glass slide.

When a water droplet is in contact with a water reservoir, it will quickly pinch off from the reservoir and form a smaller daughter droplet, while this daughter droplet will continue to go through a similar contact-pinch off-splitting process until completed coalescence into the reservoir, the combination or summary of these self-similar coalescence processes is called coalescence cascade. The underlying mechanism of coalescence cascade has been studied in detail but there has been mere attempt to control and make use of it. Until recently, Liu et al. has filled this void by proposing a new method to control coalescence cascade by using nanostructured coating at the liquid-liquid interface, —the interfacial liquid marbles.

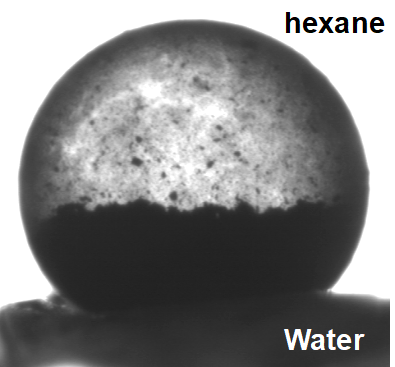
Figure 2. An interfacial water marble sitting on the hexane-water interface.

Similar to liquid marbles at the solid-air interface, the interfacial liquid marbles are constructed on the hexane/water interface using water droplets with a surface coating composed of nanoscale materials with special wettability (Figure 2). To realize interfacial water marbles at hexane/water interface, the individual particle size of the surface coating layer should be as small as possible, so that the contact line between the particles and the water reservoir can be minimized; special wettability with mixed hydrophobicity and hydrophilicity is also preferred for the interfacial water marble formation. The interfacial water marble can be fabricated by firstly coating a water droplet with nanomaterials with special wettability, e.g. hybrid carbon nanowires, graphene oxide. Afterwards a secondary coating layer of polyvinylidene fluoride (PVDF) is applied onto the coated water droplet. The doubly-coated water droplet is then cast into the hexane/water mixture and eventually settled at the hexane/water interface to form the interfacial water marble. During this process, the PVDF coating quickly diffused into hexane to balance the hydrophobic interaction between hexane and the water droplet, while the nanomaterials quickly self-assembled into a nanostructured protective layer on the droplet surface through the Marangoni effect.

The interfacial water marble can completely resist coalescence cascade and exist nearly permanently at the hexane/water interface, providing that the hexane phase is not depleted by vaporization. The interfacial water marbles can also realize a series of stimuli-responsive motions by integrating the functional materials into the surface coating layer. Due to their uniqueness in both form and behavior, the interfacial water marbles are speculated to have remarkable applications in microfluidics, microreactors and mass-transport.

== See also ==
- Pickering emulsion
- Spherification (culinary process)
