= Nakhon Phanom University =

University in Thailand

- มหาวิทยาลัยนครพนม
- Motto: พัฒนาตน ตื่นรู้ ผู้รับใช้สังคม
- Type: Public
- Established: 2 September 2005
- President: Dr. Promsawat Tipkongka
- Royal conferrer: Maha Chakri Sirindhorn, Princess Royal of Thailand on behalf of the King
- Location: Nai Mueang, Mueang, Nakhon Phanom 48000; 17.288616°N 104.782055°E
- Colours: Gold
- Website: www.npu.ac.th

Nakhon Phanom University (NPU) (Thai: มหาวิทยาลัยนครพนม, RTGS: Mahawitthayalai Nakhon Phanom) was established in 2005 by combining the existing tertiary schools of Nakhon Phanom Province, Thailand: Nakhon Phanom Rajabhat University, Nakhon Phanom Technical College, Nakhon Phanom College of Agriculture and Technology, Thatphanom Community Education College, Nawa Community Education College, and Boromarjonani College of Nursing.

== Faculties ==
Nakhon Phanom University is different from other new universities in that it continues the existing functions of the combined institutions. It provides academic training at the vocational, undergraduate, and graduate levels. The faculties, colleges, and institutes are:

- Faculty of Management Sciences and Information Technology
- Faculty of Liberal Arts and Sciences
- Faculty of Industrial Technology (former Nakhon Phanom Technical College)
- Faculty of Agriculture and Technology (former Nakhon Phanom College of Agriculture and Technology)
- Nawa College (former Nawa Industrial Community Education College)
- Thatphanom College (former Thatphanom Industrial Community Education College)
- Boromarjonani College of Nursing, Nakhon Phanom
- Tourism and Service Industry College
- International Aviation College
- Research and Development Institute
- Academic Resources Center
- Language Institute
- Srisongkram Industrial and Technology College
