= Rajamangala University of Technology Thanyaburi =

- มหาวิทยาลัยเทคโนโลยีราชมงคลธัญบุรี (มทร. ธัญบุรี)
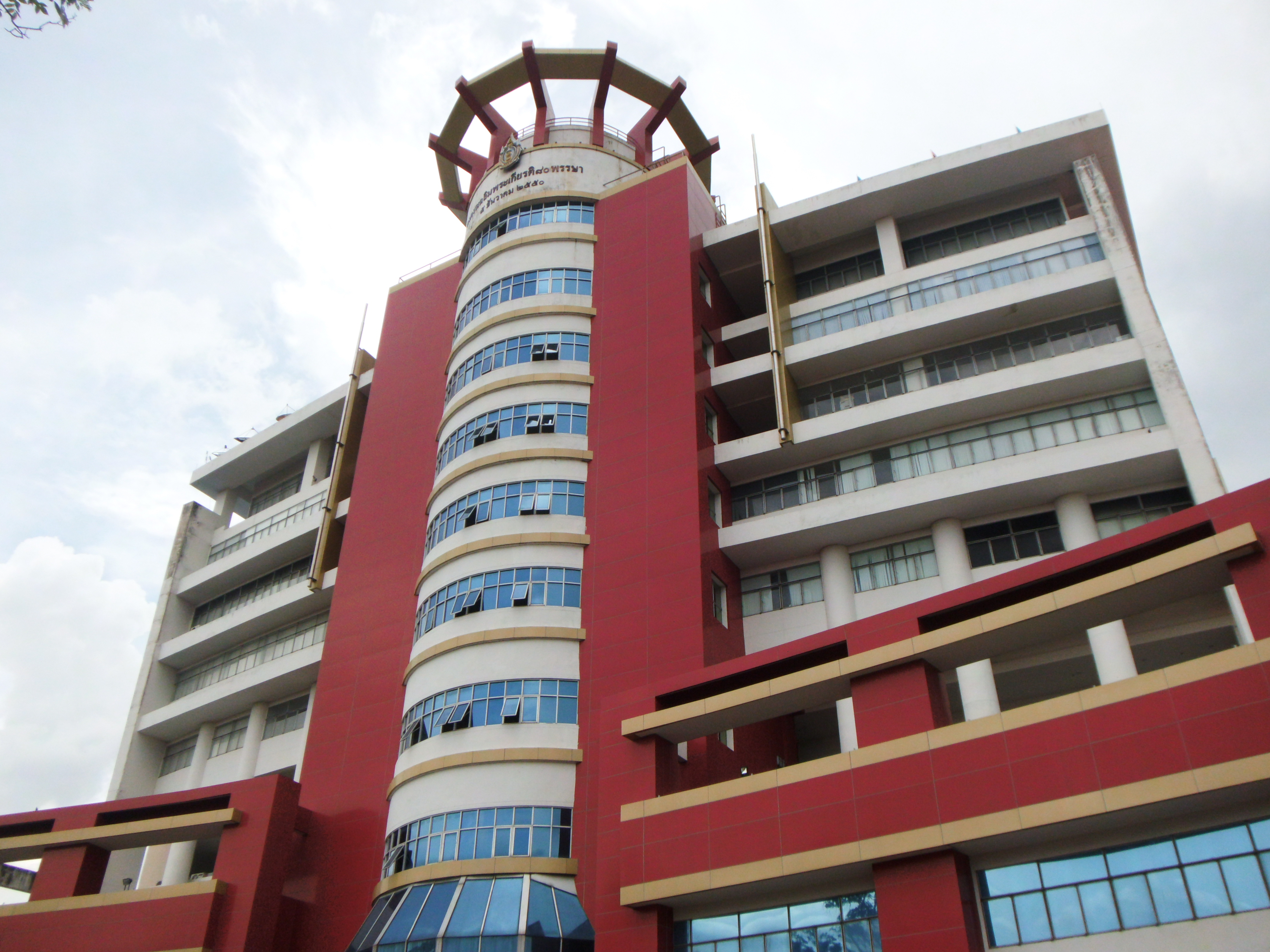
- Type: Public, RMUT
- Established: January 18, 2005
- President: Assoc. Prof. Dr. Prasert Pinpathomrat
- Royal conferrer: Maha Chakri Sirindhorn, Princess Royal of Thailand
- Faculty: 11 (10 faculties and 1 college)
- Location: 39 Moo 1 Rangsit-Nakorn Nayok Rd., Klong 6, Klong Luang, 12110, Pathum Thani, Thailand
- Campus: 1 (at Prachadipat, Thanyaburi, Pathum Thani)
- Colors: Blue
- Website: www.rmutt.ac.th

Rajamangala University of Technology Thanyaburi (abbreviated as RMUTT; Thai: มหาวิทยาลัยเทคโนโลยีราชมงคลธัญบุรี) is a public university in Pathum Thani Province, Thailand. It was established on January 18, 2005, and is a member of the Rajamangala University of Technology system. It offers undergraduate programs in various fields such as engineering, industrial technology, agriculture, business administration, industrial design, architecture, fine arts, science and technology, education, mass communication technology, arts, Thai traditional medicine, and arts-related disciplines. The university aims to produce quality professionals in alignment with the rapidly changing fields of science and technology.

RMUTT has two campuses: the central university office located in Khlong Hok Subdistrict, Khlong Luang District, Pathum Thani Province, and the Thanyaburi campus located in Prachathipat Subdistrict, Thanyaburi District, Pathum Thani Province.

== History ==
The university was established under the name Rajamangala Institute of Technology (RIT) with its campuses found nationwide which consists of nine Rajamangala Universities of Technology. Its original main campus (RMUTT) sits on an area of 750-rai on Rangsit-Nakhon Nayok Road, Tambon Klong 6 (Canal 6), Thanyaburi District, Pathum Thani province. It was one university called Rajamangala University of Technology Thanyaburi (RMUTT).

RMUTT has 10 faculties and one college, the Thai Traditional Medicine College, which offer four levels of educational programs, diploma programs in vocational education, Bachelor's Degree, Master's Degree and Doctor's Degree programs.

Under the Institute of Technology and Vocational Education Act 1975, the Institute of Technology and Vocational Education (ITVE) was founded on 27 February 1975 as a department under the Ministry of Education and took the key roles of a tertiary education Institute in offering educational programs, undertaking research, and providing academic services to the community.

== Faculty ==
The location of the two six-centered universities is at Khlong Luang District and Pathum Thani Campus.

There are 11 Faculties in the University. They contain many of programs and some of them has split Department

1. Faculty of Liberal Arts [visit]
  1. Bechelor's Degree
    1. Program of Arts Tourism
    2. Program of Arts in English Communication
    3. Program of Arts Hotel Management
    4. Program of Arts in Aviation Service Industry
    5. Program of Arts in Physical Education
    6. Program of Arts in English for International Professions
  2. Master's Degree
    1. Program of Arts English for Career Development
    2. Program of Arts Public Management Innovation
  3. Doctor of Philosophy Degree
    1. Doctor of Philosophy Environmental Social Sciences and Sustainable Development
    2. Doctor of Philosophy Doctor of Philosophy Program in Public Management Innovation
2. Faculty of Technical Education [visit]
  1. Bachelor Degree
    1. Program of Education Educational Technology and Communication
    2. Program of Science in Technical Education Electrical Engineering
    3. Program of Education Computer Education
    4. Program of Education Digital Technology for Education
    5. Program of Science in Technical Education Mechanical Engineering
    6. Program of Education Educational Information Technology
    7. Program of Science in Technical Education Industrial Engineering
    8. Science in Technical Education Electronics and Automation Systems Engineering
    9. Program of Engineering Mechatronics Engineering
    10. Program of Education Digital Technology for Education
    11. Program of Science Learning Innovation and Information Technology
    12. Program of Industrial Technology Construction Management Technology
    13. Program of Industrial Technology Industrial Production
    14. Program of Industrial Technology Production Technology
  2. Master's Degree
    1. Program of Education Educational Technology and Communications
    2. Program of Education Technology in Curriculum Research and Development
    3. Program of Education Research and Curriculum Development
    4. Program of Education Educational Administration Technology
    5. Program of Engineering Mechatronics Engineering
    6. Program of Education M.Ed. Educational Administration Technology
    7. Program of Education M.Ed. Educational Administration
    8. Program of Education Educational Administration
    9. Program of Engineering Mechatronics Engineering (International Program)
  3. Doctor of Philosophy Degree
    1. Doctor of Philosophy Technical Education
    2. Doctor of Science in Technical Education Vocational Education
    3. Doctor of Science in Technical Education Research and Development on Learning of Vocational Education
3. Faculty of Agricultural Technology [visit]
  1. Bachelor Degree
    1. Program of Science Plant Science-Horticulture
    2. Program of Science Crop Production
    3. Program of Science Animal Science
    4. Program of Science Integrated Animal Production
    5. Program of Science Fisheries
    6. Program of Science Animal Health Science
    7. Program of Science Landscape Technology
    8. Program of Applied Thai Traditional Medicine Applied Thai Traditional Medicine
    9. Program of Science Aesthetic Health and Thai Spa
    10. Program of Science Post Harvest and Processing Technology
    11. Program of Science Agricultural Products Processing Engineering
  2. Master Degree
    1. Program of Science Crop Production Technology
    2. Program of Science Sustainable Pest Management
    3. Program of Science Agro - Industry Technology
    4. Program of Science Food Technology
    5. Program of Science Innovation and technology of plant production
    6. Program of Science Innovation and technology of animal production
    7. Program of Science Innovation and Technology of Food
    8. Program of Science Innovation and technology of aquaculture
4. Faculty of Engineering [visit]
  1. Bachelor Degree
    1. Program of Engineering Engineering (General Engineering)
    2. Program of Engineering Civil Engineering
    3. Program of Engineering Surveying Engineering
    4. Program of Engineering Environmental Engineering
    5. Program of Engineering Electrical Engineering (General Electrical Engineering)
    6. Program of Engineering Electrical Engineering-Electrical Power (Power and Energy Engineering)
    7. Program of Engineering Mechanical Engineering
    8. Program of Engineering Industrial Engineering - Manufacturing Processes Engineering
    9. Program of Engineering Industrial Engineering (General Industrial)
    10. Program of Engineering Industrial Engineering - Automation Production System Engineering
    11. Program of Engineering Industrial Engineering - Engineering Management
    12. Program of Engineering Industrial Engineering - Industrial and Logistics Engineering
    13. Program of Textile Engineering - Garment Engineering
    14. Program of Engineering Electronics and Telecommunication Engineering
    15. Program of Engineering Avionic Engineering
    16. Program of Engineering Computer Engineering
    17. Program of Engineering Chemical Engineering
    18. Program of Engineering Plastics Engineering
    19. Program of Materials Engineering
      1. Department of Polymers Engineering
      2. Department of Composites Engineering
    20. Program of Engineering Agricultural Industrial Engineering
    21. Program of Engineering Irrigation Engineering and Water Management
    22. Program of Engineering Food Engineering
  2. Master Degree
    1. Program of Engineering Civil Engineering
    2. Program of Engineering Electrical Engineering
    3. Program of Engineering Electrical Engineering-Electrical Power
    4. Program of Engineering Mechanical Engineering
    5. Program of Engineering Industrial Engineering
    6. Program of Engineering Industrial Engineering - Manufacturing Processes Engineering
    7. Program of Engineering Industrial Engineering - Automation Production System Engineering
    8. Program of Engineering Industrial Engineering - Engineering Management
    9. Program of Engineering Textile Engineering
    10. Program of Engineering Electronics and Telecommunication Engineering - Telecommunication Engineering
    11. Program of Engineering Computer Engineering
    12. Program of Engineering Plastics Engineering
    13. Program of Engineering Garment Engineering
    14. Program of Structural Engineering
    15. Program of Transportation Engineering
    16. Program of Engineering Construction Engineering and Management Construction Engineering and Management
    17. Program of Engineering Geotechnical Engineering Geotechnical Engineering
    18. Program of Engineering Transportation Engineering Transportation Engineering
    19. Program of Engineering Water Resource Engineering
    20. Program of Environmental Engineering Environmental Engineering
    21. Program of Electrical Power Engineering
    22. Program of Electronics and Telecommunication Engineering
    23. Program of Engineering Electrical Engineering and Automation Control Electrical Engineering and Automation Control
    24. Program of Engineering Computer Engineering
    25. Program of Mechanical Engineering
    26. Program of Robotics and Controls
    27. Program of Railway System Engineering
    28. Program of Energy Engineering
    29. Program of Mechanical Systems and Design
    30. Program of Agricultural and Food Engineering
    31. Program of Engineering Textile Engineering
    32. Program of Engineering Electronics and Telecommunication Engineering
      1. Department of Electronics Engineering
      2. Department of Telecommunication Engineering
    33. Program of Chemical Engineering
    34. Program of Materials Engineering
  3. Doctor of Philosophy Degree
    1. Doctor of Engineering Civil Engineering-Structural Engineering
    2. Doctor of Engineering Structural Engineering
    3. Doctor of Engineering Construction Engineering and Management Construction Engineering and Management
    4. Doctor of Engineering Electrical Engineering
    5. Doctor of Engineering Energy and Materials Engineering
    6. Doctor of Philosophy Civil Engineering
    7. Doctor of Environmental Engineering
    8. Doctor of Philosophy Electrical Engineering
    9. Doctor of Philosophy Mechanical Engineering
    10. Doctor of Industrial Engineering
    11. Doctor of Material Engineering
    12. Doctor of Chemical Engineering
5. Faculty of Business Administration [visit]
  1. Bachelor Degree
    1. Program of Business Administration Marketing
      1. Department of Marketing
      2. Department of Retailing
      3. Department of Exhibition and Event Marketing
    2. Program of Business Administration Management
      1. Department of General Management
      2. Department of Office Management
      3. Department of Management-Human Resource Management
      4. Department of Innovative Business Management
    3. Program of Accountancy Bachelor of Accountancy
    4. Program of Business Computer
    5. Program of Business Administration Finance and Investment
    6. Program of Business Administration International Business Administration
    7. Program of Business Administration Logistics and Supply Chain Management
    8. Program of Economics
  2. MBA (Master Degree)
    1. Program of Business Administration Marketing
    2. Program of Business Administration Management
    3. Program of Business Administration Business Engineering Management
    4. Program of Business Administration Logistics and Supply Chain Management
    5. Program of Business Administration Accounting
    6. Program of Business Administration Information Systems for Business
    7. Program of Business Administration Finance
    8. Program of Business Administration International Business
  3. Doctor of Philosophy Degree
    1. Doctor of Philosophy Marketing
    2. Doctor of Philosophy Management
    3. Doctor of Philosophy Accounting
    4. Doctor of Philosophy Information System Information System
    5. Doctor of Philosophy Business Administration
    6. Doctor of Philosophy Finance
    7. Doctor of Philosophy Economic
    8. Doctor of Philosophy International Business Administration
6. Faculty of Home Economics Technology [visit]
  1. Bachelor Degree
    1. Program of Home Economics Fashion Design and Clothing Innovation
    2. Program of Home Economics Textiles and Clothing
      1. Department of Clothing Technology
      2. Department of Clothing Business
      3. Department of Fashion Design
    3. Program of Home Economics Fashion Design and Merchandising
    4. Program of Home Economics Fashion Design and Clothing
    5. Program of Home Economics Foods and Nutrition
    6. Program of Home Economics Foods Service Industry
    7. Program of Economics Creative Crafts Technology
    8. Program of Home Economics Creative Arts Innovation
    9. Program of Home Economics Family and Child Development
    10. Program of Home Economics General Home Economics
    11. Program of Education Early Childhood Education
  2. Master Degree
    1. Program of Home Economics Home Economics Technology
    2. Program of Home Economics Textiles and Clothing
    3. Program of Home Economics Food and Nutrition
    4. Program of Home Economics Crafts
    5. Program of Home Economics Family and Child Development
7. Faculty of Fine and Applied Arts [visit]
  1. Bachelor Degree
    1. Program of Fine Arts Painting
    2. Program of Fine Arts Leatherwork
    3. Program of Fine Arts Visual Art
    4. Program of Fine Arts Graphic Arts
    5. Program of Fine Arts Sculpture
    6. Program of Fine Arts Thai Arts
    7. Program of Fine Arts Ceramics
    8. Program of Fine Arts Interior Design
    9. Program of Fine Arts Crafts
    10. Program of Fine Arts Music
    11. Program of Fine Arts Visual Communication Design
    12. Program of Fine Arts Fashion Design and Textile Art
    13. Program of Fine Arts Innovative Contemporary Product Design
    14. Program of Education Dance Education
    15. Program of Education Thai Classical Dance Education
    16. Program of Education Thai Music
    17. Program of Education Western Music Education
    18. Program of Education Arts Education
  2. Master Degree
    1. Program of Fine Arts and Design
    2. program of Education Dramatic Arts Education
8. Faculty of Mass Communication Technology [visit]
  1. Bachelor Degree
    1. Program of Technology Film and Television Production Technology
    2. Program of Technology Digital Printing and Packaging Technology
    3. Program of Technology Advertising and Public Relations Technology
    4. Program of Creative Media Technology
      1. Department of Full Stack Development Technology
      2. Department of Digital Game Development Technology
  2. Master Degree
    1. Program of Science Mass Communication Technology
    2. Program of Science Color Technology and Design
  3. Doctor of Philosophy Degree
    1. Doctor of Philosophy Color Science and Human Vision
    2. Doctor of Philosophy Color Technology and Design
9. Faculty of Science and Technology [visit]
  1. Bechalor Degree
    1. Program of Science Applied Mathematics
    2. Program of Science Applied Chemistry
    3. Program of Science Applied Biology
    4. Program of Science Mathematics
    5. Program of Science Biology
    6. Program of Science Applied Physics-Instrumentation Technology
    7. Program of Science Applied Physics-Materials Innovation and Nanotechnology
    8. Program of Applied Statistics
    9. Program of Computer Science
    10. Program of Information Technology and Digital Communication
    11. Program of Big Data Management and Analytics
    12. Program of Applied Physics
    13. Program of Food Science and Technology Management
  2. Master Degree
    1. Program of Science Innovative Chemistry
    2. Program of Science Materials Chemistry and Nanotechnology
    3. Program of Science Analytical Chemistry and Biological Chemistry
    4. Program of Applied Biology
    5. Program of Science Biotechnology in Industry
    6. Program of Science Biotechnology in Agricultures and Environments
    7. Program of Data and Information Science
    8. Program of Science Mathematics
  3. Doctor of Philosophy Degree
    1. Doctor of Philosophy Materials Chemistry and Nanotechnology
    2. Doctor of Philosophy Environmental and Analytical Chemistry
    3. Doctor of Philosophy Biochemicals
    4. Doctor of Philosophy Biotechnology in Industry
10. Faculty of Architecture [visit]
  1. Bechalor Degree
    1. Program of Architectural Technology
    2. Program of Interior Architecture
  2. Master Degree
    1. Program of Creative Innovation Architecture for Sustainability
11. Faculty of Integrative Medicine [visit]
  1. Bechalor Degree
    1. Program of Applied Thai Traditional Medicine
    2. Program of Science Health and Aesthetic
    3. Program of Science Innovation of Health Products
  2. Master Degree
    1. Program of Science General Complementary and Alternative Medicine
    2. Program of Science Herbal Science
12. Faculty of Nursing [visit]
  1. Bechalor Degree
    1. Program of Nursing Science Bachelor of Nursing Science
  2. None Degree (Certificated)
    1. Certificate Program for Practical Nursing Practical Nursing

== Stadium ==
The University owns and operates the multi-purpose Rajamangala University of Technology Thanyaburi Stadium. It is currently used mostly for football matches and is the home stadium of Rangsit F.C.
