= Candidates of the 2026 Thai general election =

The 2026 Thai general election will be held on 8 February to elect 500 seats of the House of Representatives – 400 will be elected from constituency seats and 100 from a party-list. Registration for candidates and political parties seeking to contest seats was open from 27 to 31 December 2025. By the end of the period, 57 parties were registered. In total, 5,096 individuals registered as candidates with 3,526 seeking to contest constituency seats and 1,570 seeking to contest party-list seats. 93 politicians from 47 parties were also nominated as candidates for prime minister. Candidates were allowed to nominate up to three candidates for prime minister and the prime minister can only be elected if they were nominated. Bangkok Constituency 30 has the highest number of candidates contesting the seat at 19.

== Prime ministerial candidates ==
=== By major parties ===
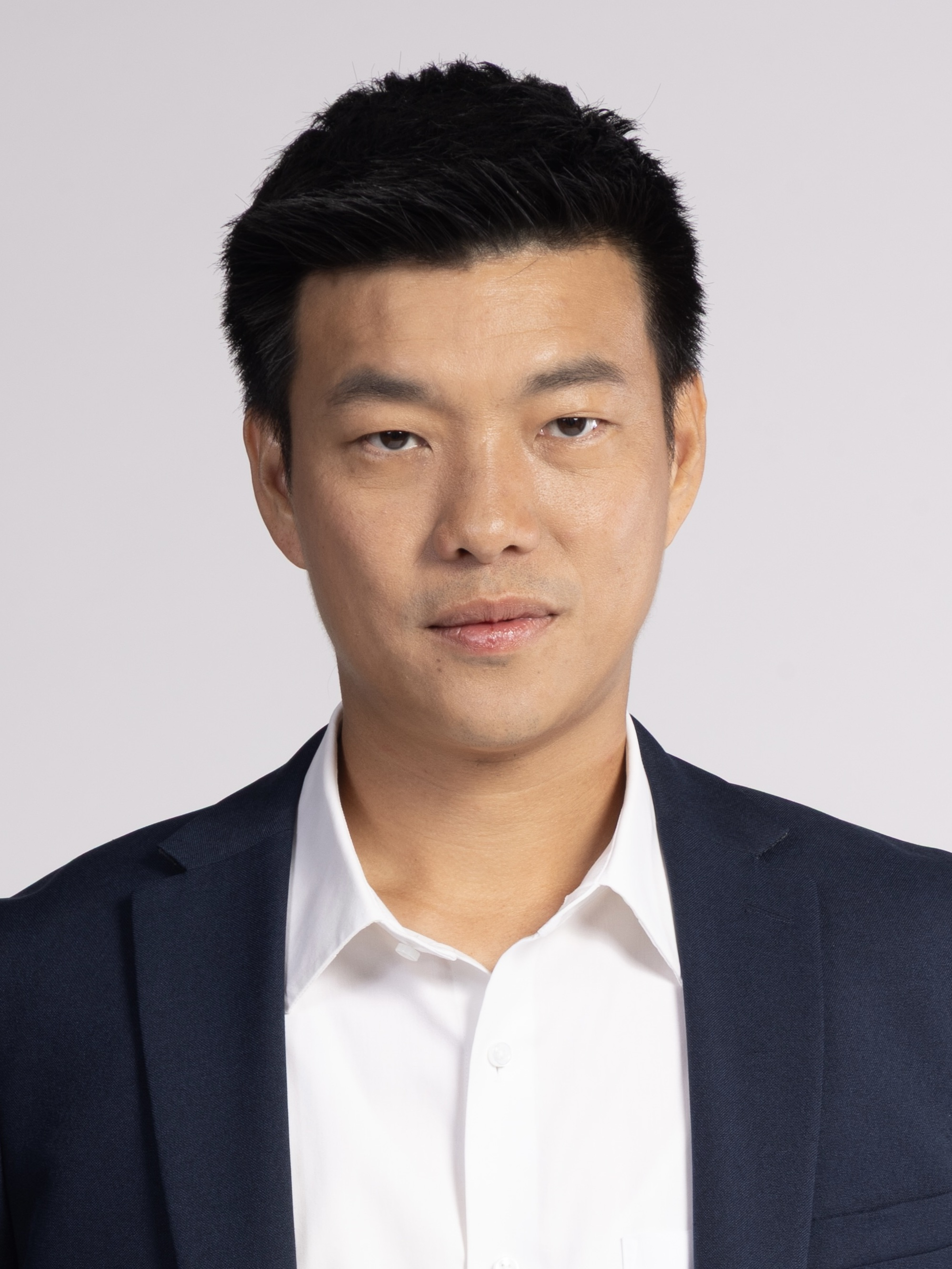
Natthaphong Ruangpanyawut, the People's Party lead candidate for PM.

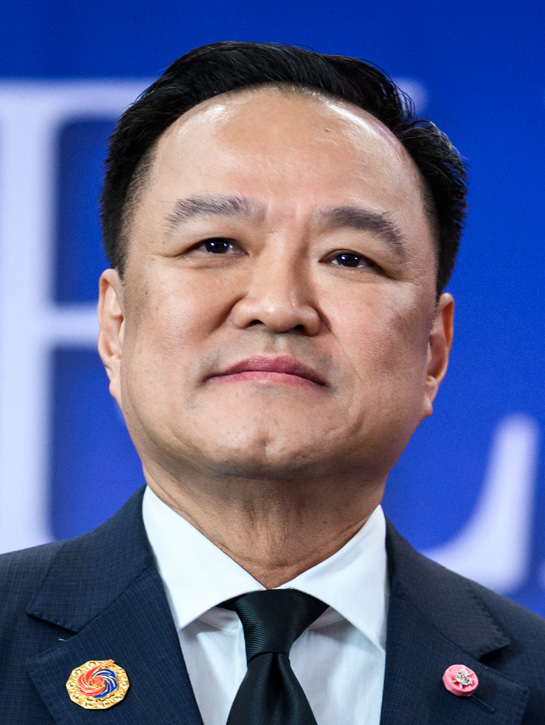
Anutin Charnvirakul, Bhumjaithai's lead candidate for PM.

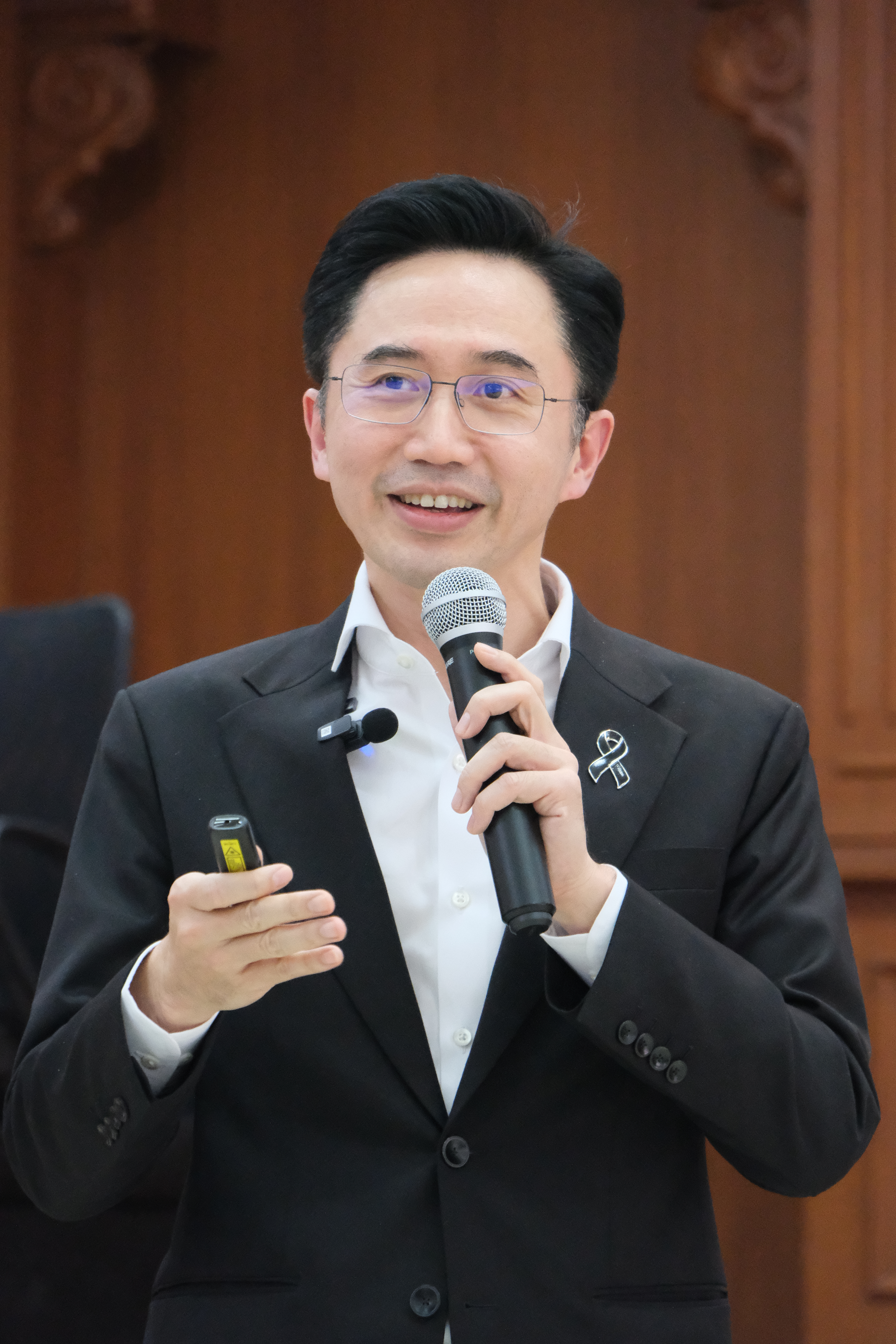
Yodchanan Wongsawat, Pheu Thai's lead candidate for PM.

This is a list of candidates nominated for prime minister by major parties (parties who held a significant number of seats in the House of Representatives by the time it was dissolved on 12 December 2025).

| Party | Lead candidate | Other candidates | |
|---|---|---|---|
| Bhumjaithai Party | Anutin Charnvirakul | Sihasak Puangketkaew | |
| Democrat Party | Abhisit Vejjajiva | Korn Chatikavanij | Karndee Leopairote |
| Kla Tham Party | Thamanat Prompow | | |
| Palang Pracharath Party | Trinuch Thienthong | | |
| People's Party | Natthaphong Ruengpanyawut | Sirikanya Tansakun | Veerayooth Kanchoochat |
| Pheu Thai Party | Yodchanan Wongsawat | Julapun Amornvivat | Suriya Juangroongruangkit |
| Prachachat Party | Tawee Sodsong | Wan Muhamad Noor Matha | |
| Thai Sang Thai Party | Sudarat Keyuraphan | Paradon Pattanatabut | Phokhin Polkul |
| United Thai Nation Party | Pirapan Salirathavibhaga | Atavit Suwanpakdee | Narapat Kaeothong |

=== By minor parties ===
This is a list of candidates nominated for Prime Minister by minor parties (parties who either held no seats in the House of Representatives when it was dissolved or who held only a few seats).

| Party | Lead candidate | Other candidates | |
|---|---|---|---|
| Economic Party | Rangsi Kitiyansap | | |
| Fair Party | Pitipong Temcharoen | Punyavee Temcharoen | Monwalee Panthonothai |
| Fusion Party | Kittipat Liengprasert | | |
| Independent Party | Kochaporn Werojn | Kiatphum Siriphan | Chanchai Tophrueksa |
| Movement Party | Kannavee Suebsang | | |
| Nation Building Labour Party | Manas Kosol | Wasan Phanngoen | |
| New Alternative Party | Rachen Trakunwiang | Mongkolkit Suksintharanon | Sitthisak Phattanachai |
| New Democracy Party | Suratin Pichan | | |
| New Opportunity Party | Jatuporn Buruspat | Prabhat Jongsanguan | Tossaporn Serirak |
| New Party | Surasit Matchadet | Songtrakun Somkham | Nawinda Sawatdechdee |
| Party of Thai Counties | Bancha Dejcharoensirikul | Attasit Chuensanguan | Thanongsak Sirirat |
| People's Power Party | Thanaporn Vaithayanuvat | Chalermphon Uttarath | Aphiwitch Thiprat |
| Phue Cheevit Mai Party | Thongprasert Chantharamphon | | |
| Promp Party | Pichcha Khamsuwann | Phimmaithong Sakkhipatphokin | |
| Rak Chart Party | Jetsada Tonawanik | Chaiwut Thanakamanusorn | |
| Thai Chana Party | Chakraphong Chinduang | Chaiyong Rattanawan | Chiamsak Chansena |
| Thai Citizen Party | Kanisorn Sommaluan | Narong Phrueksarungreung | Thunrawin Phongkamlanon |
| Thai Kao Mai Party | Suchatvee Suwansawat | Kalaya Sophonpanich | |
| Thai Liberal Party | Sereepisuth Temeeyaves | | |
| Thai Morality Party | Supisarn Pakdeenarunath | Kitikon Wichairueangtham | Wisarut Krutkaivan |
| Thai Pakdee Party | Warong Detkitvikrom | | |
| Thai People's Party | Ekasit Kunanantakul | | |
| Thai Population Party | Boonyong Chansang | | |
| Thai Progress Party | Watcharapol Butsomkorn | Sit Sitthimongkhon | Kusumalawati Sirikomut |
| Thai Ruam Palang Party | Wasawat Puangphonsri | | |
| The Farmer Network of Thailand Party | Wachira Supharam | | |
| The Nation Thai's People Volunteer Party | Jiradech Prommana | Wetchasak Duangurai | |
| Vision Mai Party | Thongrob Danampai | Pichet Sathirachawal | Chotananpricha Sapphiran |

== Constituency candidates ==
In the registration period, 3,526 people registered as candidates to contest the 400 available constituency seats. In Nakhon Nayok province, Pheu Thai failed to register their candidates in time. The party had won both constituencies in the province in 2023. Just prior to the election, 18 constituency candidates were disqualified by the Electoral Commission and any votes towards them would be counted as invalid. Six were from Kla Tham, three from Palang Pracharath, two each from the Movement Party and Pheu Thai, and one each from Thai Sang Thai, Democrat, People's, Puea Ban Muang and Thai Kao Mai parties.

This list is a summary of the number of constituency candidates nominated by some of the major parties in each of Thailand's 76 provinces and Bangkok.

| Province | Seats | PP | BJT | PT | DEM | UTN | KT | PPRP | TST | PCC | Other | Total: |
|---|---|---|---|---|---|---|---|---|---|---|---|---|
| Amnat Charoen | 2 | 2 | 2 | 2 | 2 | 1 | 1 | 2 | | | 5 | 17 |
| Ang Thong | 2 | 2 | 2 | 2 | 2 | | 1 | 1 | | | | 10 |
| Bangkok | 33 | 33 | 33 | 33 | 33 | 33 | 33 | 23 | 33 | | 249 | 503 |
| Bueng Kan | 3 | 3 | 3 | 3 | 3 | 3 | 3 | 1 | | | 8 | 27 |
| Buriram | 10 | 10 | 10 | 10 | 10 | 10 | 10 | | 2 | | 26 | 88 |
| Chachoengsao | 4 | 4 | 4 | 4 | 4 | | 4 | 1 | | | 5 | 26 |
| Chai Nat | 2 | 2 | 2 | 2 | 2 | | 2 | 2 | | | | 12 |
| Chaiyaphum | 7 | 7 | 7 | 7 | 7 | 7 | 6 | 2 | | | 19 | 57 |
| Chanthaburi | 3 | 3 | 3 | 3 | 3 | 1 | 3 | 1 | | | 7 | 24 |
| Chiang Mai | 10 | 10 | 10 | 10 | 10 | 7 | 10 | 6 | | | 44 | 107 |
| Chiang Rai | 7 | 7 | 6 | 7 | 7 | 7 | 6 | 2 | | | 10 | 52 |
| Chonburi | 10 | 10 | 10 | 10 | 10 | 5 | 2 | 9 | 5 | | 31 | 93 |
| Chumphon | 3 | 3 | 3 | 3 | 3 | | 1 | 1 | | | 6 | 20 |
| Kalasin | 6 | 6 | 6 | 6 | 6 | 6 | 6 | 5 | | | 26 | 67 |
| Kamphaeng Phet | 4 | 4 | 4 | 4 | 4 | 1 | 4 | 3 | | | 6 | 30 |
| Kanchanaburi | 5 | 5 | 5 | 5 | 5 | 2 | 2 | 2 | | | 13 | 39 |
| Khon Kaen | 11 | 11 | 11 | 11 | 11 | 9 | 9 | 4 | 1 | | 30 | 97 |
| Krabi | 3 | 3 | 3 | 3 | 3 | | 1 | 2 | | | 4 | 19 |
| Lampang | 4 | 4 | 4 | 4 | 4 | 2 | 4 | 3 | 1 | | 6 | 32 |
| Lamphun | 2 | 2 | 2 | 2 | 2 | 2 | 2 | 1 | | | 7 | 20 |
| Loei | 4 | 4 | 4 | 4 | 4 | 2 | 4 | 3 | | | 5 | 30 |
| Lopburi | 4 | 4 | 4 | 4 | 4 | 4 | 3 | 4 | 2 | | 8 | 37 |
| Mae Hong Son | 2 | 2 | 1 | 2 | 2 | 2 | 2 | 1 | | | | 12 |
| Maha Sarakham | 6 | 6 | 6 | 6 | 6 | 5 | 6 | 4 | | | 21 | 60 |
| Kalasin | 6 | 6 | 6 | 6 | 6 | 6 | 6 | 5 | | | 26 | 67 |
| Mukdahan | 2 | 2 | 2 | 2 | 2 | 1 | 2 | 2 | | | 6 | 19 |
| Nakhon Nayok | 2 | 2 | 2 | | 2 | 1 | 2 | 1 | | | 1 | 11 |
| Nakhon Pathom | 6 | 6 | 6 | 6 | 6 | 2 | 6 | 1 | | | 19 | 52 |
| Nakhon Phanom | 4 | 4 | 4 | 4 | 4 | 4 | 4 | 1 | 2 | | 13 | 40 |
| Nakhon Ratchasima | 16 | 16 | 16 | 16 | 16 | 6 | 14 | 10 | | | 48 | 142 |
| Nakhon Sawan | 6 | 6 | 6 | 6 | 6 | | 6 | 1 | | | 12 | 43 |
| Nakhon Si Thammarat | 9 | 9 | 9 | 9 | 9 | 7 | 6 | 3 | | | 23 | 75 |
| Nan | 3 | 3 | 3 | 3 | 3 | 3 | 3 | 3 | | | 8 | 29 |
| Narathiwat | 5 | 4 | 5 | 5 | 5 | 1 | 5 | 2 | | 5 | 4 | 36 |
| Nong Bua Lamphu | 3 | 3 | 3 | 3 | 3 | 3 | 3 | 2 | 1 | | 11 | 32 |
| Nong Khai | 3 | 3 | 3 | 3 | 3 | | 1 | 2 | | | 5 | 20 |
| Nonthaburi | 8 | 8 | 8 | 8 | 7 | 4 | 8 | 4 | | | 21 | 68 |
| Pathum Thani | 8 | 8 | 8 | 8 | 8 | 8 | 5 | 8 | | | 19 | 72 |
| Pattani | 5 | 5 | 5 | 5 | 5 | 1 | 5 | 1 | | 5 | 1 | 33 |
| Phang Nga | 2 | 2 | 2 | 2 | 2 | | 2 | | | | 1 | 11 |
| Phatthalung | 3 | 3 | 3 | 3 | 3 | 1 | 3 | | | | 8 | 24 |
| Phayao | 3 | 3 | 3 | 3 | 3 | 1 | 3 | 1 | | | | 17 |
| Phetchabun | 6 | 6 | 6 | 6 | 6 | 1 | 6 | 3 | | | 16 | 50 |
| Phetchaburi | 3 | 3 | 3 | 3 | 3 | | 1 | | | | 2 | 15 |
| Phichit | 3 | 3 | 3 | 3 | 3 | 3 | 3 | 1 | | | 3 | 22 |
| Phitsanulok | 5 | 5 | 5 | 5 | 5 | 1 | 5 | 2 | | | 6 | 34 |
| Phra Nakhon Si Ayutthaya | 5 | 5 | 5 | 5 | 5 | 5 | 2 | 2 | 2 | | 8 | 39 |
| Phrae | 3 | 3 | 3 | 3 | 3 | 1 | 3 | 1 | | | | 17 |
| Phuket | 3 | 3 | 3 | 3 | 3 | | 3 | 1 | | | 4 | 20 |
| Prachinburi | 3 | 3 | 3 | 3 | 3 | | 1 | | | | 5 | 18 |
| Prachuap Khiri Khan | 3 | 3 | 3 | 3 | 3 | | 3 | | 2 | | 5 | 22 |
| Ranong | 1 | 1 | 1 | 1 | 1 | | 1 | | | | | 5 |
| Ratchaburi | 5 | 5 | 5 | 5 | 5 | 5 | 4 | 1 | 1 | | 4 | 35 |
| Rayong | 5 | 5 | 4 | 5 | 5 | 4 | 1 | 2 | 4 | | 4 | 34 |
| Roi Et | 8 | 8 | 7 | 8 | 8 | 8 | 6 | 5 | 3 | | 12 | 65 |
| Sa Kaeo | 3 | 3 | 3 | 3 | 3 | | 3 | 2 | | | 9 | 26 |
| Sakon Nakhon | 7 | 7 | 7 | 7 | 7 | 5 | 7 | 3 | | | 19 | 62 |
| Samut Prakan | 8 | 8 | 8 | 8 | 8 | 3 | 8 | 6 | | 1 | 30 | 80 |
| Samut Sakhon | 4 | 4 | 4 | 4 | 4 | 1 | 4 | 3 | 3 | | 6 | 33 |
| Samut Songkhram | 1 | 1 | 1 | 1 | 1 | | 1 | | | | 1 | 6 |
| Saraburi | 4 | 4 | 4 | 4 | 4 | 3 | 4 | 2 | | | 8 | 33 |
| Satun | 2 | 2 | 2 | 2 | 2 | 2 | 2 | | | | 2 | 14 |
| Sing Buri | 1 | 1 | 1 | 1 | 1 | | 1 | 1 | | | | 6 |
| Sisaket | 9 | 9 | 9 | 9 | 9 | 6 | 9 | 4 | | | 29 | 83 |
| Songkhla | 9 | 9 | 9 | 9 | 9 | 7 | 7 | 2 | | 2 | 11 | 65 |
| Sukhothai | 4 | 4 | 4 | 4 | 4 | 3 | 4 | 1 | | | 6 | 30 |
| Suphan Buri | 5 | 5 | 5 | 5 | 5 | | 4 | 2 | 2 | | 8 | 36 |
| Surat Thani | 7 | 7 | 7 | 7 | 7 | 4 | 5 | 2 | | | 14 | 51 |
| Surin | 8 | 8 | 8 | 8 | 8 | 7 | 8 | 4 | | | 22 | 73 |
| Tak | 3 | 3 | 3 | 3 | 3 | 2 | 3 | | | | 7 | 24 |
| Trang | 4 | 4 | 4 | 4 | 4 | 4 | 3 | | | | 5 | 28 |
| Trat | 1 | 1 | 1 | 1 | 1 | | 1 | 1 | 1 | | | 7 |
| Ubon Ratchathani | 11 | 11 | 10 | 11 | 11 | 3 | 5 | 7 | 3 | | 25 | 86 |
| Udon Thani | 10 | 10 | 10 | 10 | 10 | 10 | 9 | 8 | | 1 | 26 | 94 |
| Uthai Thani | 2 | 2 | 2 | 2 | 2 | | | | | | 1 | 9 |
| Uttaradit | 3 | 3 | 3 | 3 | 3 | 3 | 3 | 1 | | | 4 | 23 |
| Yala | 3 | 3 | 3 | 3 | 3 | | 3 | 1 | | 3 | 4 | 23 |
| Yasothon | 3 | 3 | 3 | 3 | 3 | | 1 | 2 | | | 8 | 23 |
| Total: | 400 | 399 | 393 | 398 | 399 | 249 | 350 | 203 | 113 | 17 | 1076 | 3,526 |
