= Sujate Jantarang =

Dr. Sujate Jantarang is the President of Mahanakorn University of Technology in Thailand. He succeeded Professor Sitthichai Pookaiyaudom to become president. Prior to his current position, he was an associate professor in the department of computer engineering at Mahanakorn University of Technology.

He attended public school, graduating from Suankularb Wittayalai School. He entered King Mongkut's Institute of Technology Ladkrabang (KMITL) where he received his B.Eng., M.Eng., and D.Eng. degrees in Electronics and Computer Engineering. His research in electronic circuits and systems and key inventions have made significant contributions to the betterment of Thai society. Among his major inventions are a prototype taxi meter nowadays found in Bangkok cabs, THAI-PHAT earth-mapping satellite launched by a Russian rocket, and an unmanned aerial vehicle (UAV). Dr. Jantarang received Thailand's Young Scientist Award in 1994 for his research achievements.
