= Detention and deportation of Uyghurs by Thailand =

2014–2015 humanitarian and diplomatic incident in Thailand

From 2014 to 2025, a series of humanitarian and diplomatic incidents arose around the detention and deportation of Uyghur refugees by the Thai government, following their capture from a human smuggling camp in Songkhla Province. While 173 of the asylum seekers, mostly women and children, were sent to Turkey in 2015, over 100 others were deported back to China, and 40 were held in detention for over a decade before being sent to China in February 2025, prompting condemnation from international organizations and human rights groups.

== Background ==
The Uyghurs are a Turkic ethnic group from Xinjiang, a region now in northwest China that is subject to a long-standing ethnic conflict. Following riots in 2009 and subsequent violent attacks, the Chinese government increasingly imposed restrictions in what has been described as persecution of the populace. Since 2009, an increasing number of Uyghurs from Xinjiang have tried to escape China via Southeast Asia, with the aim of reaching Turkey. Many have been unsuccessful, with groups captured in Cambodia, Myanmar and Malaysia respectively in 2009, 2010 and 2011 being deported back to China. This was likely in response to pressure from the Chinese government, which views the refugees as a security threat, concerned that they might join terrorist groups and plan attacks back in China.

In late 2013, Thai immigration police chief Panu Kerdlarppol met with officials in Kunming to discuss the issue of North Korean refugees. However, the Chinese officials were more concerned with illegal Uyghur migration and warned of such groups attempting to travel through Thailand. Thailand had also been dealing with an influx of Rohingya escaping Myanmar, thousands of whom were detained in 2013 in an early phase of the Rohingya refugee crisis.

== Initial detention and 2015 deportations ==
On 13 March 2014, Thai police raided a human-smuggling camp in the jungles of Songkhla province, near the Malaysian border, and detained around 220 refugees. They initially claimed to be Turkish, but were suspected and later found to be Uyghurs attempting to enter Malaysia, where they expected to secure Turkish travel documents for onward travel to Turkey. Earlier, 112 suspected Uyghurs had been detained in Sa Kaeo province near the Cambodian border. Further arrests in Songkhla, later in March, brought the total number of detainees up to over 400.

Thai officials liaised with the UNHCR as well as Turkish and Chinese consular officials to determine the proper course of action, but while Turkey signified that it would accept the refugees as its citizens, Chinese officials insisted that they be sent back to China—an option warned against by rights groups, saying that they faced harsh treatment and punishment if returned. In November, Turkish foreign minister Mevlut Cavusoglu asked Thailand to send the refugees to Turkey, prompting a sharp rebuke from the Chinese foreign ministry. Amid the dispute between Turkey and China, the refugees continued to be held in detention by Thailand, with women and children housed in shelters while the men and older boys were interred in facilities known as immigration detention centers (IDCs). By November, over a hundred of the women and children had escaped; some were recaptured, while some eventually reached Turkey.

By May 2015, almost 400 Uyghurs remained in Thai custody. Then in June, 173 detainees, mostly women and children, were suddenly revealed to have been sent to Turkey, arriving on a 30 June flight. Shortly after, however, 109 detainees were deported to China on 8 July, drawing condemnation from Turkey, the United States, and the UNHCR. Protesters attacked the Thai consulate in Istanbul. According to analysis by The New York Times, the actual figure may have been as high as 150, and up to 306 had initially been planned for deportation.

The Chinese government alleged that the deported Uyghurs were on their way to fight in the Middle East and that some had been implicated in terrorist activities in China.

The following month, a terrorist bombing at the Erawan Shrine in Bangkok on 17 August killed 20 and injured 125. Two Uyghur suspects were arrested, prompting speculation that the attack was in retribution for the deportations. The Thai government, however, has played down the connection, and the court case has progressed very slowly. The suspects were sentenced to death in June 2026 by a Thai court in Bangkok.

== Extended detention ==
After 2015, the remaining refugees were left in a state of indefinite detention, with the Thai government apparently unwilling to commit to a course of action. Around 20 escaped in 2017, but over 50 still remained in IDCs throughout the country. After another 3 escaped in 2022, the remaining refugees were moved to the Suan Plu IDC in Bangkok.

Conditions at the overcrowded Suan Plu IDC were bad, and the Uyghurs were subject to worse treatment than the other detainees, without access to communication, legal counsel, or humanitarian assistance. Two detainees died in 2023 (adding to previous deaths of a newborn child and a three-year-old boy in 2014, and another man in 2018), prompting a renewed wave of international attention calling for the release of the remaining 48 detainees (43 held in Suan Plu and 5 in prison for a previous escape attempt), though the Thai government refused to take action.

Among the remaining 48 Uyghurs, United Nations human rights experts asserted nearly half suffered from serious health conditions, including kidney dysfunction, diabetes, and lung and heart conditions.

On 8 January 2025, the 43 detainees were asked by Thai immigration officials to sign voluntary deportation papers. The detained men later made a public plea against their deportation, in a letter obtained by the Associated Press. The letter claimed the Thai Government was planning to deport them to China.

In January 2025, US Senator Marco Rubio pledged to press Thailand against deporting the 48 Uyghurs during his Senate confirmation hearing for Secretary of State.

== 2025 deportation ==
At around 02:00 on the morning of 27 February 2025, a convoy of trucks with black sheets covering windows left Bangkok's Immigration Detention Center in Soi Suan Phlu. The trucks traveled to Don Mueang International Airport, where an unscheduled China Southern Airlines flight left at 04:48 local time. The flight landed 6 hours later in Kashgar, Xinjiang.

The Chinese Embassy in Bangkok confirmed that 40 Chinese nationals who had entered Thailand illegally were deported by a chartered flight.

The deportation was confirmed by the Thai government on the evening of 27 February. Minister of Defense Phumtham Wechayachai commented that the Thai government had received assurances from China that the Uyghurs would be looked after, and that they were sent back in accordance with international standards.

== Last detainees ==
On 27 April, the last three Uyghur detainees at Suan Plu IDC were transferred for resettlement in Canada. They were not deported to China as they held Kyrgyz passports.

== Reactions ==
The 2025 deportation was condemned by human rights groups, including Asia Human Rights and Labour Advocates, Human Rights Watch, and Amnesty International.

United Nations High Commissioner for Human Rights Volker Türk described the deportation as "a clear violation of international human rights laws and standards".

US Secretary of State Marco Rubio condemned the deportation in a statement. In March 2025, Rubio announced sanctions on Thai government officials and potential restrictions on family members of those sanctioned.

On 28 February 2025, the US and Japanese embassies in Bangkok issued security alerts following the deportation. The alerts cited previous deportations of Uyghurs as factors in the 2015 bombing of the Erawan Shrine, which killed 20.

Opposition lawmaker Kannavee Suebsang claimed Australia, the United States, and Sweden had offered to resettle the 48 Uyghurs prior to their deportation. An official for the US State Department confirmed the US had offered to resettle the asylum-seekers, along with Canadian government sources confirming Canada had offered resettlement. Thailand's Vice Minister for Foreign Affairs, Russ Jalichandra, confirmed that other countries had offered resettlement, but noted that Thailand could face retaliation from China if the Uyghurs were sent to another country.

== See also ==
- Transnational repression by China
