= List of international guests hosted by President Alexander Stubb =

List of international guests hosted by President of Finland Alexander Stubb. The list includes mainly people who are mentioned in the press releases of the Office of the President of the Republic of Finland.

== 2024 ==
International guests hosted by President Alexander Stubb in 2024.
No.	Year	Date	Guest	Country/Organization	Reason for visit	Other	References
1.	2024	5–6 June	Jens Stoltenberg, Secretary General of NATO	NATO	Security and defence policy issues, the situation in Ukraine and the forthcoming NATO summit		
2.	2024	13–14 June	Baiba Braže, Foreign minister of Latvia, Espen Barth Eide, Foreign minister of Norway, Gabrielius Landsbergis, Foreign minister of Lithuania, Mark Rutte, Prime minister of the Netherlands, Radosław Sikorski, Foreign minister of Poland	Latvia, Norway, Lithuania, The Netherlands, Poland	Kultaranta Talks		
3.	2024	4–5 September	Tamim bin Hamad Al Thani, Emir of Qatar	Qatar	Economic and political cooperation between the two countries, the ongoing wars in Ukraine and Gaza		
4.	2024	19 September	Filippo Grandi, United Nations High Commissioner for Refugees	UNHCR			

== 2025 ==
International guests hosted by President Alexander Stubb in 2025.
No.	Year	Date	Guest	Country/Organization	Reason for visit	Other	References
5.	2025	23 February	Tim Kaine, US Democratic senator	United States			
6.	2025	26–27 February	Alar Karis, President of Estonia	Estonia	Working visit		
7.	2025	4–5 March	Frederik X, King of Denmark, and Mary, Queen	Denmark	State visit	Stubb’s speech at the gala dinner	
8.	2025	12 March	Pedro Sánchez, Prime minister of Spain	Spain	Working visit		
9.	2025	18–20 March	Volodymyr Zelenskyy, President of Ukraine with spouse	Ukraine	Official visit		
10.	2025	3–4 April	Alexander Van der Bellen, President of Austria	Austria	Working visit		
11.	2025	3 April	Jim Skea, president of IPCC	Scotland	Working visit		
12.	2025	22–23 April	Victoria, Crown Princess of Sweden	Sweden	Working visit		
13.	2025	23–24 April	Vjosa Osmani-Sadriu, President of Kosovo	Kosovo	Working visit		
14.	2025	23–24 April	Ahmed Attaf, Foreign Minister of Algeria	Algeria	Working visit		
15.	2025	6 May	Luc Frieden, Prime Minister of Luxembourg	Luxembourg	Working visit		
16.	2025	19 May	Gintautas Paluckas, Prime Minister of Lithuania	Lithuania	Working visit		
17.	2025	22 May	Nikos Christodoulides, President of Cyprus	Cyprus	Working visit		
18.	2025	27 May	Friedrich Merz, Chancellor of Germany	Germany	Working visit		
19.	2025	2 June	Carl XVI Gustaf, King of Sweden and Queen Silvia	Sweden	50th anniversary of the Hanasaari Swedish-Finnish cultural centre		
20.	2025	16–17 June	Alar Karis, President of Estonia	Estonia	Kultaranta Talks 2025		
21.	2025	16–17 June	Edgars Rinkēvičs, President of Latvia	Latvia	Kultaranta Talks 2025		
22.	2025	16–17 June	Musalia Mudavadi, Prime Minister of Kenya	Kenya	Kultaranta Talks 2025		
23.	2025	16–17 June	Arnoldo André Tinoco, Minister of Foreign Affairs	Costa Rica	Kultaranta Talks 2025		
24.	2025	16–17 June	Olushegun Adjadi Bakar, Minister of Foreign Affairs	Benin	Kultaranta Talks 2025		
25.	2025	16–17 June	Russ Jalichandra, Vice Minister for Foreign Affairs	Thailand	Kultaranta Talks 2025		
26.	2025	16–17 June	Carl Bildt, Vice Chairman of European Council on Foreign Relations	Sweden	Kultaranta Talks 2025		
27.	2025	29–30 July	Santiago Peña, President of Paraguay	Paraguay	Working visit		
28.	2025	31 July	Feridun Sinirlioğlu, Secretary General of OSCE	(Organization for Security and Co-operation in Europe) OSCE	Helsinki+50 Conference		
29.	2025	28 August	Ursula von der Leyen, President of the European Commission	(European Union) EU	von der Leyen's visits in frontline states		
30.	2025	2 September	Gitanas Nausėda, President of Lithuania	Lithuania	Working visit		
31.	2025	9 September	Karol Nawrocki, President of Poland	Poland	Working visit		
32.	2025	7–8 October	Halla Tómasdóttir, President of Iceland	Iceland	State visit	Speech by President of the Republic of Finland Alexander Stubb at the Gala Dinner on the occasion of the state visit from Iceland	
33.	2025	21–22 October	Tô Lâm, General Secretary of the Communist Party of Vietnam	Vietnam	Official visit		
34.	2025	26 November	Alain Berset, President of the European Council	(European Union) European Council	Working visit		

== 2026 ==
International guests hosted by President Alexander Stubb in 2026
No.	Year	Date	Guest	Country/Organization	Reason for visit	Other	References
35.	2026	26 March	Keir Starmer, Prime Minister of the United Kingdom, Gitanas Nausėda, President of Lithuania, Jonas Gahr Støre, Prime Minister of Norway, Ulf Kristersson, Prime Minister of Sweden, Evika Siliņa, Prime Minister of Latvia, Kristen Michal, Prime Minister of Estonia, Kristrún Frostadóttir, Prime Minister of Iceland, Rob Jetten, Prime Minister of the Netherlands, Anders Friborg, Danish Permanent Under-Secretary of State for Foreign Affairs	United Kingdom; Lithuania; Norway; Sweden; Latvia; Estonia; Iceland; Netherlands; Denmark	JEF Leaders’ Summit		
36.	2026	18 April	Roberta Metsola, President of the European Parliament	European Union	Working visit		
37.	2026	28–29 April	Alar Karis, President of Estonia	Estonia	State visit		
38.	2026	7 May	Frank-Walter Steinmeier, President of Germany	Germany	Working visit		
39.	2026	1 June	Nataša Pirc Musar, President of Slovenia	Slovenia	Working visit		
40.	2026	10–11 June	William Ruto, President of Kenya	Kenya	State visit		
41.	2026	2 June	Numan Kurtulmuş, Speaker of the Turkish parliament	Turkey	Working visit		
42.	2026	5 July	Wang Yi, Foreign Minister of China	China	Working visit		
43.	2026	2 October	Maia Sandu, President of Moldova	Moldova	Working visit		
44.	2026	6–7 October	Felipe VI, King of Spain; Letizia, Queen of Spain	Spain	State visit		
45.	2026	14 October	Ülle Madise, President of Estonia	Estonia	Working visit		
46.	2026	23 October	Ukhnaagiin Khürelsükh, President of Mongolia	Mongolia	Working visit		
