= Virachai Virameteekul =

- วีระชัย วีระเมธีกุล

Minister of Science and Technology
- In office 6 June 2010 – 9 August 2011
- Prime Minister: Abhisit Vejjajiva
- Preceded by: Kalaya Sophonpanich
- Succeeded by: Plodprasop Suraswadi

Minister to the Office of the Prime Minister
- In office 20 December 2008 – 6 June 2010
- Prime Minister: Abhisit Vejjajiva
- Preceded by: Sutin Klangsang; Sukumpan Ngonkam
- Succeeded by: Ongart Klampaiboon

Personal details
- Born: 8 June 1967 (age 59) Bangkok, Thailand
- Party: Democrat Party
- Education: Chulalongkorn University
- Profession: Politician; businessman

Virachai Virameteekul (Thai: วีระชัย วีระเมธีกุล, RTGS: Wirachai Wiramethikun; born 8 June 1967) is a Thai economist, university professor, and Democrat Party politician.

== Education ==
Virachai Virameteekul holds a doctorate degree in accounting from the Chulalongkorn University in Bangkok. Prior to that, he spent his high school and college years in the United States, both on the West and the East coasts. He is a fluent speaker of English and Mandarin Chinese with a keen interest in the Spanish language. In his leisure time, he likes to read books, particularly on travel and wellness, and listen to classical music. Apart from this, jogging, cycling and practicing yoga and are also his favorite recreation.

== Business career ==
Virachai began his career as a lecturer at Chulalongkorn University in 1990. While teaching full-time there, he also gave lectures at various places such as Thammasat University, Assumption University, Bangkok University and Dhuradijbundit University as a visiting lecturer. His career path changed dramatically in 1994 when he decided to move to China to accept a position in the financial sector. He started as an Executive Vice President at the TM International Bank, and was later promoted to Senior Executive Vice President and President of the bank. He left his banking career in China in 2000 as Vice Chairman at the Business Development Bank.

== Political career ==
After returning to Thailand, Virachai contested the general election in 2001 and was elected Member of Parliament for the Democrat Party. He has continued to work in the public sector since then, acting in both legislative and executive capacities. In the legislative body, he occupied important positions such as First Vice Chairman of the Standing Committee on Monetary Affairs, Finance, Banking, and Finance Institutions (2001–2003), and First Vice Chairman of the Standing Committee on Economic Development (2001–2003). In the executive body, he was also appointed a number of senior government positions, including Vice Minister of the Ministry of Agriculture and Cooperatives (2003–2004), Vice Minister of the Ministry of Finance (2004–2005), Vice Minister of the Ministry of Foreign Affairs (2005–2006), Deputy Secretary-General to the Prime Minister for Political Affairs (2006–2008) and lately Minister attached to the Prime Minister’s Office (2008–2010).

In 2010, Virachai changed to the Ministry of Science and Technology, succeeding Kalaya Sophonpanich. He held that office until the Democrats' electoral defeat in 2011.

== Royal Decorations ==
As regards the Royal Decorations of Thailand, he was appointed a Knight Grand Cross (1st Class) of the Most Exalted Order of the White Elephant in 2007, and later a Knight Grand Cordon (Special Class) of the Most Noble Order of the Crown of Thailand in 2009.

- - Knight Grand Cross (1st Class) of the Most Exalted Order of the White Elephant (ประถมาภรณ์ช้างเผือก)
- - Knight Grand Cordon (Special Class) of the Most Noble Order of the Crown of Thailand (มหาวชิรมงกุฎ)
- - Knight Grand Cordon (Special Class) of the Most Exalted Order of the White Elephant (มหาปรมาภรณ์ช้างเผือก)
