= Rayong =

City in Thailand

Rayong ระยอง
- City Municipality
- City of Rayong เทศบาลนครระยอง
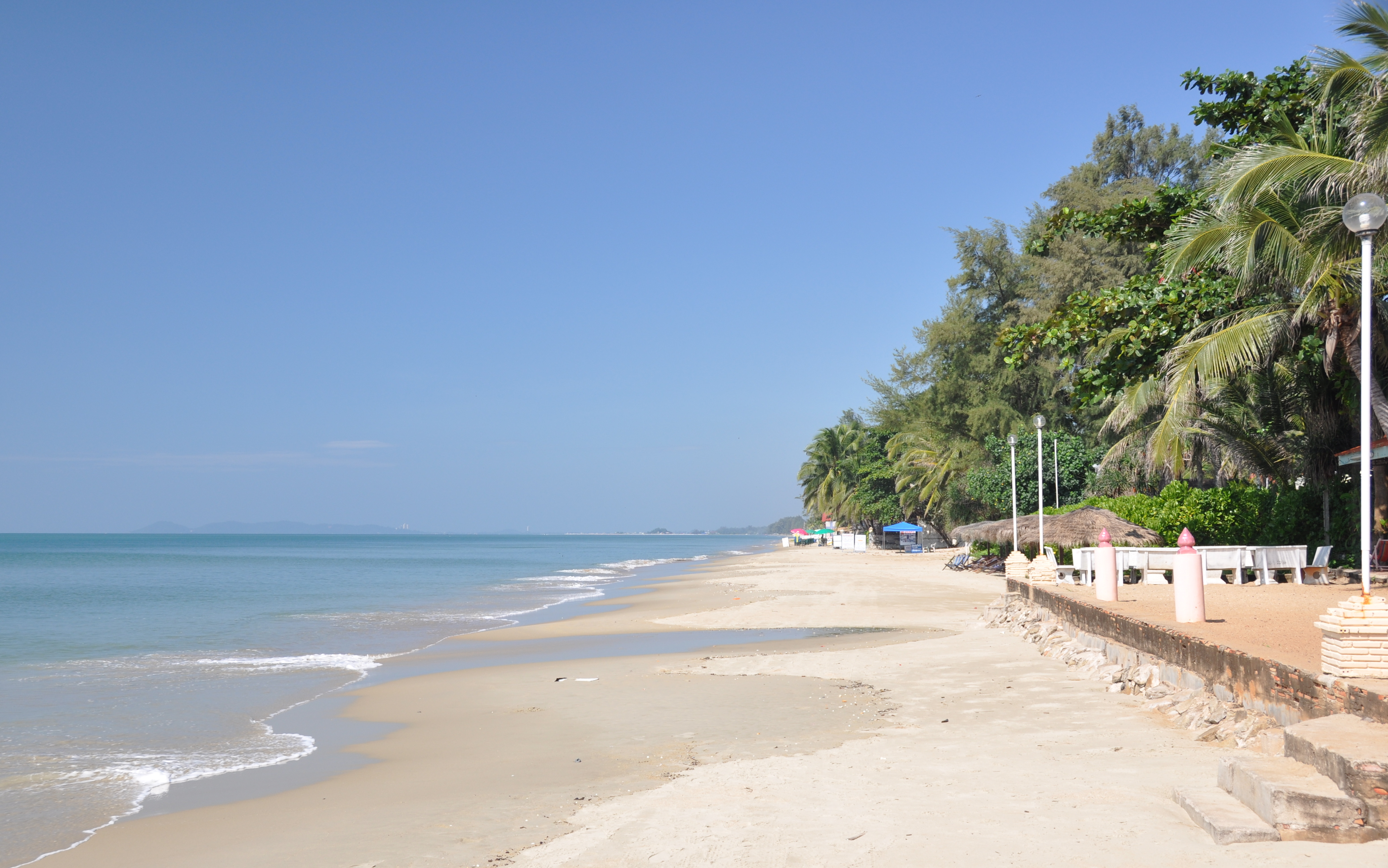
- Chakphong, Klaeng district, Rayong

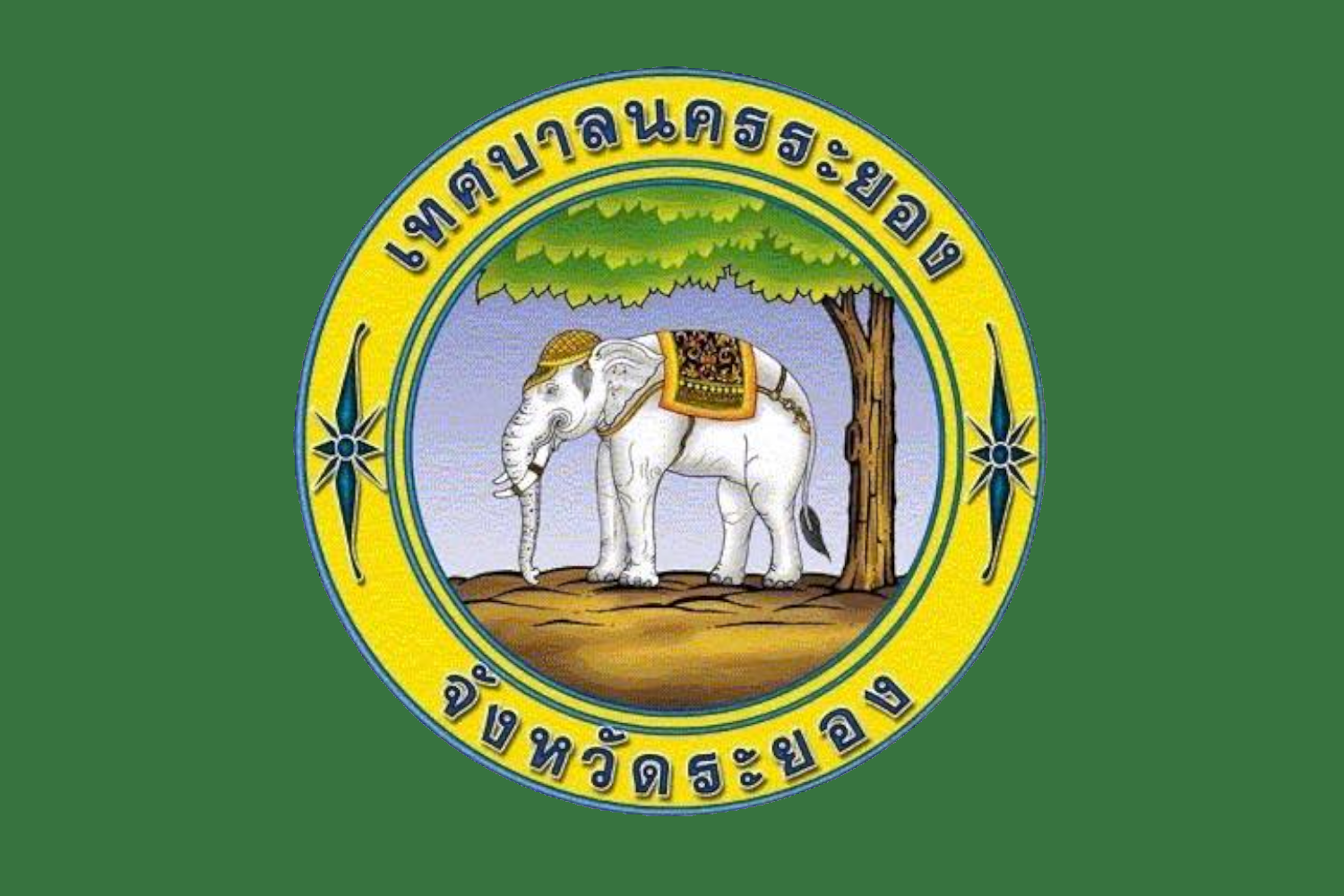
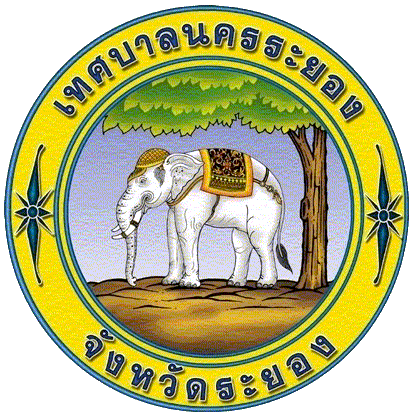
- Flag Seal

- Location in Rayong province

- Location in Thailand
- Coordinates: 12°40′27″N 101°16′44″E
- Country: Thailand
- Province: Rayong
- District: Mueang Rayong

Government
  - Type: City Municipality
  - Mayor: Worawit Sopchokchai

Area
  - Total: 16.95 km^{2} (6.54 sq mi)

Population (2016)
  - Total: 64,256
  - Density: 3,791/km^{2} (9,818/sq mi)
- Time zone: UTC+7 (ICT)
- Area code: (+66) 38
- Website: rayongcity.go.th

Rayong (Thai: ระยอง, pronounced [rá(ʔ).jɔ̄ːŋ]) is a city (thesaban nakhon) on the east coast of the Gulf of Thailand and the capital of Rayong province. It covers tambons Tha Pradu and Pak Nam and parts of tambons Choeng Noen and Noen Phra, all within Mueang Rayong district. As of 2016 the population was 64,256 (est.). The main industry is fishing, and it is also the main producer of Thailand's fish sauce. It is also the center of the chemical and auto industries. In 2012 Ford Motor Company opened an assembly plant in Rayong to expand Ford's presence in the ASEAN area, employing some 2,200 people.

Rayong was named an Asia-Pacific City of the Future by the Financial Times in 2017.

== Etymology ==
Rayong comes from the Chong word for Pterocarpus macrocarpus, (commonly known as Burma Padauk, and in Thai “Pradu”) a tree that is common in the region.

== History ==
During the late Ayutthaya period, when the former capital of Thailand was being destroyed by the invading Burmese, general Phaya Tak marched his troops to Rayong in order to build up his navy before proceeding on to Chanthaburi. He was later anointed "king" in Rayong. Phaya Tak later became King Taksin of the Kingdom of Thonburi, after which he returned to Ayutthaya, defeated the Burmese and set up a new capital in Thonburi.

Yomjinda Road bisects one of Rayong's oldest settlements. The road follows the Rayong River which, in the reign of King Rama VI, was the chief means of transport. The community rehabilitated the old town and today it has become a tourist destination.

== Education ==
- Rayongwittayakom School
- Rayongwittayakhompaknam School

== People ==
- Sutthi Atchasai: (environmentalist fighting pollution at Map Ta Phut; died in 2014)
- Narasak Ittiritpong: (racing driver; born 1983)
- Nadthawan Panthong: (mixed martial artist; born 1997; better known as Stamp Fairtex)

== Gallery ==
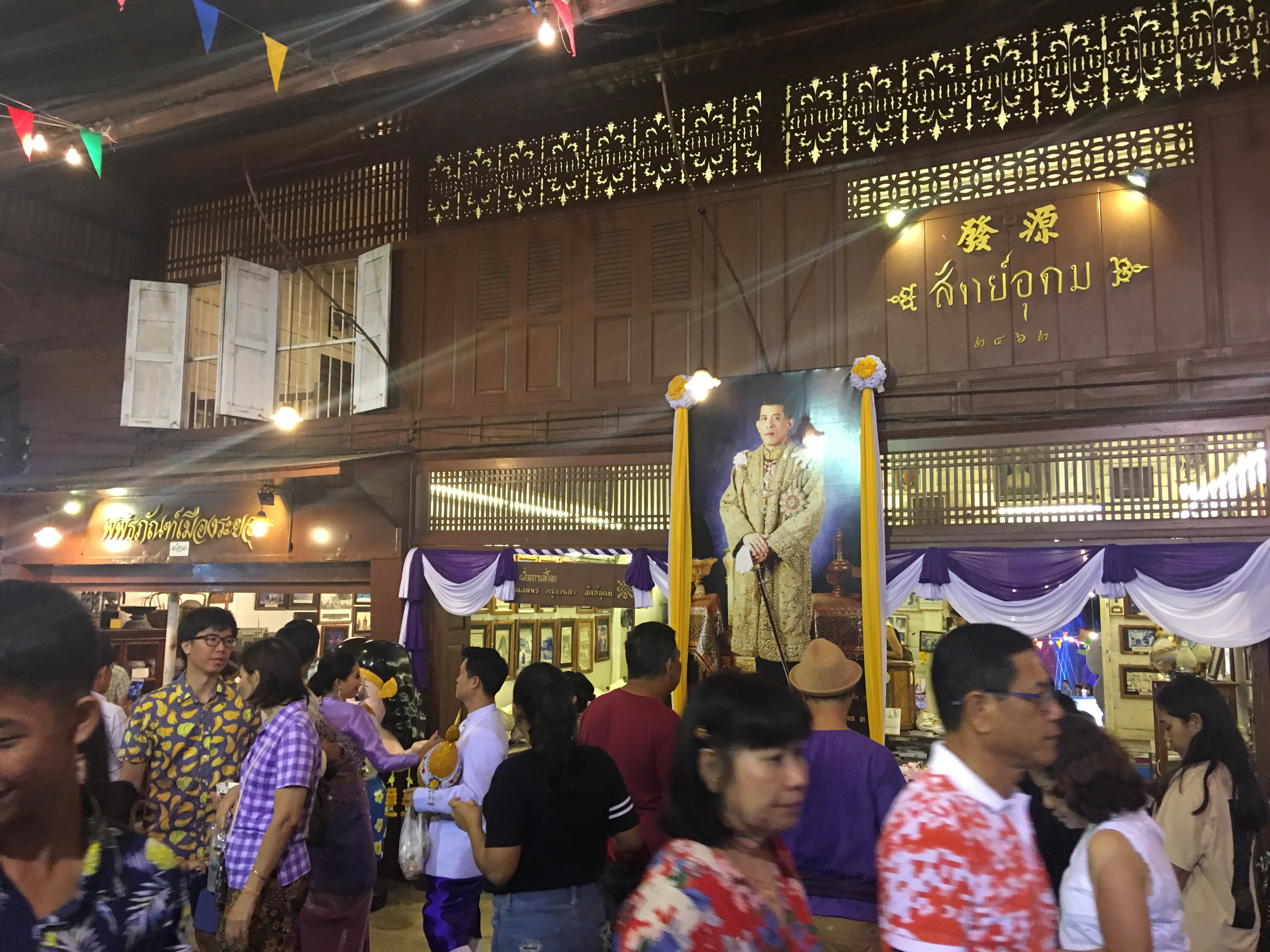
Rayong Storytelling Festival, Yomjinda Road, 31 March 2018

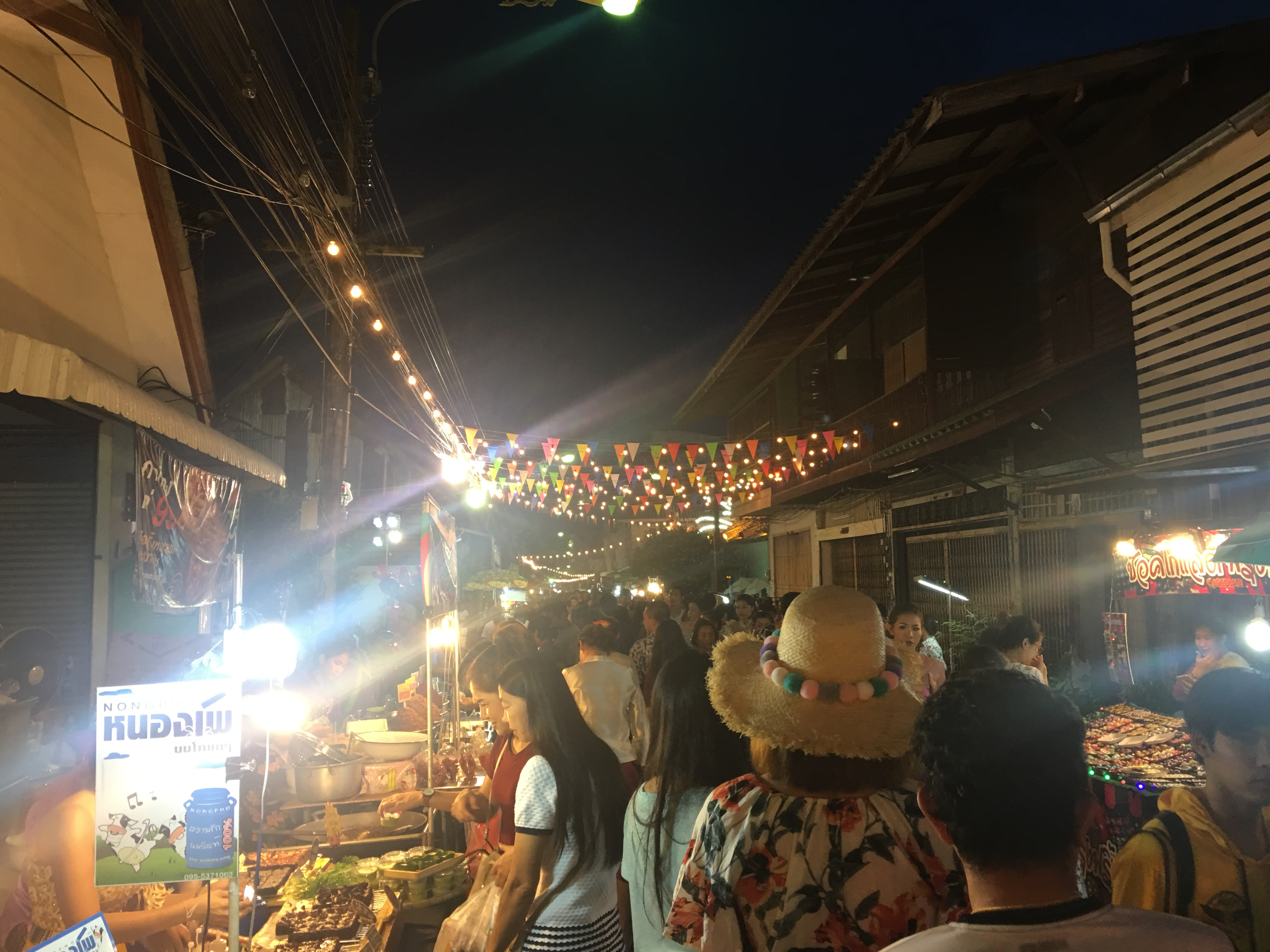
Yomjinda Road, 31 March 2018

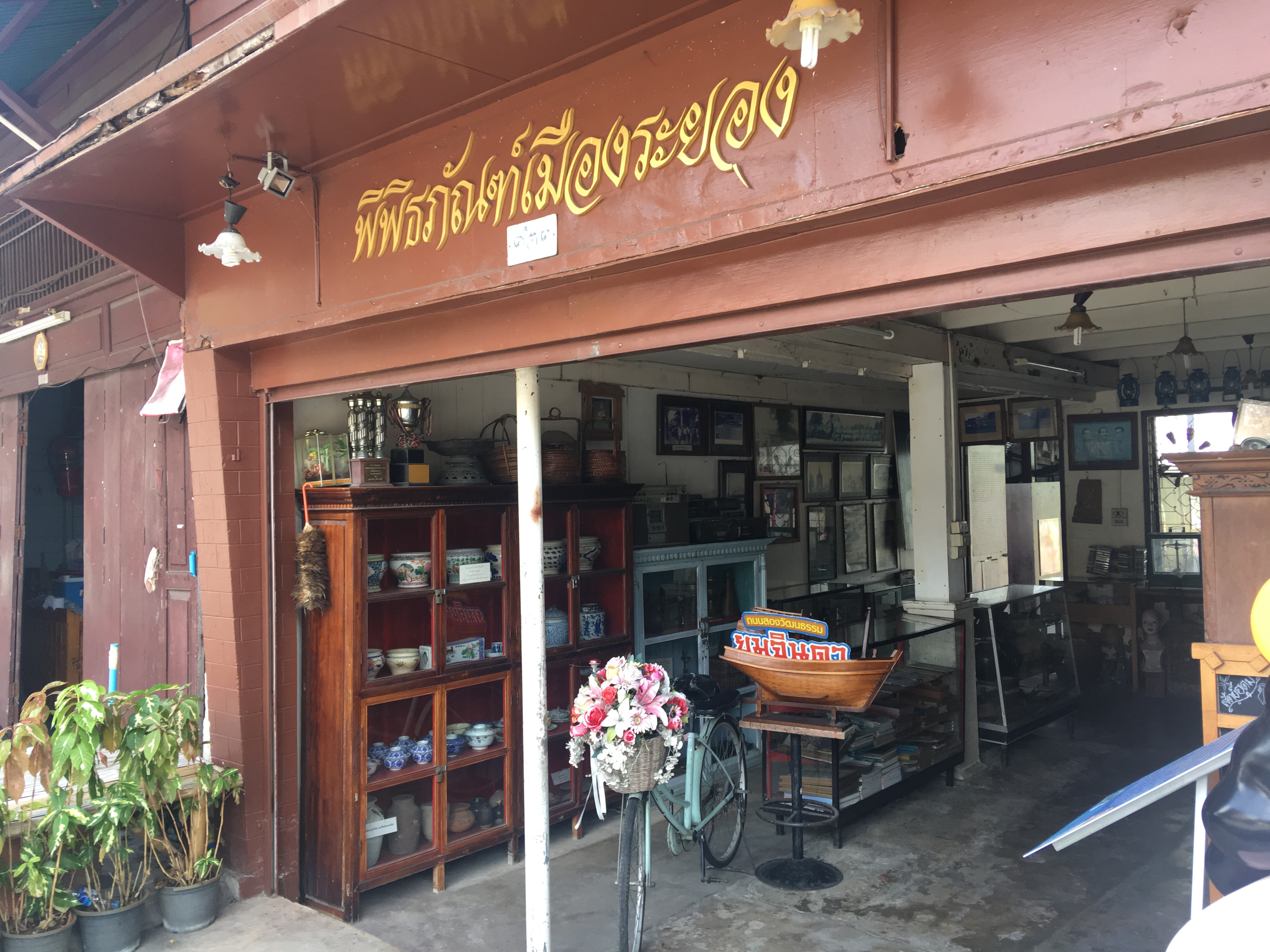
Rayong Museum, Yomjinda Road

== Climate ==
Climate data for Rayong (1991–2020, extremes 1981-present)
Month	Jan	Feb	Mar	Apr	May	Jun	Jul	Aug	Sep	Oct	Nov	Dec	Year
Record high °C (°F)	37.0 (98.6)	37.5 (99.5)	37.9 (100.2)	40.0 (104.0)	39.5 (103.1)	38.0 (100.4)	38.0 (100.4)	38.0 (100.4)	37.3 (99.1)	37.2 (99.0)	37.3 (99.1)	37.5 (99.5)	40.0 (104.0)
Mean daily maximum °C (°F)	31.9 (89.4)	32.4 (90.3)	33.0 (91.4)	34.0 (93.2)	33.5 (92.3)	32.7 (90.9)	32.2 (90.0)	32.0 (89.6)	31.8 (89.2)	32.3 (90.1)	32.8 (91.0)	32.2 (90.0)	32.6 (90.6)
Daily mean °C (°F)	26.5 (79.7)	27.8 (82.0)	29.0 (84.2)	30.0 (86.0)	29.9 (85.8)	29.5 (85.1)	29.0 (84.2)	28.8 (83.8)	28.3 (82.9)	27.7 (81.9)	27.5 (81.5)	26.4 (79.5)	28.4 (83.1)
Mean daily minimum °C (°F)	22.2 (72.0)	24.5 (76.1)	26.4 (79.5)	27.3 (81.1)	27.3 (81.1)	27.0 (80.6)	26.8 (80.2)	26.6 (79.9)	25.7 (78.3)	24.7 (76.5)	23.7 (74.7)	22.1 (71.8)	25.4 (77.6)
Record low °C (°F)	14.5 (58.1)	16.3 (61.3)	17.5 (63.5)	19.0 (66.2)	22.3 (72.1)	21.5 (70.7)	22.0 (71.6)	22.5 (72.5)	21.7 (71.1)	18.3 (64.9)	17.0 (62.6)	13.3 (55.9)	13.3 (55.9)
Average precipitation mm (inches)	29.3 (1.15)	32.2 (1.27)	70.5 (2.78)	84.7 (3.33)	190.5 (7.50)	177.9 (7.00)	176.5 (6.95)	128.2 (5.05)	268.8 (10.58)	196.3 (7.73)	44.3 (1.74)	7.5 (0.30)	1,406.7 (55.38)
Average precipitation days (≥ 1.0 mm)	2.2	2.6	4.0	5.2	10.8	12.0	11.0	9.8	14.6	13.3	4.2	1.1	90.8
Average relative humidity (%)	75.0	76.4	77.5	77.0	78.7	79.1	79.5	80.0	82.3	82.2	74.5	70.6	77.7
Mean monthly sunshine hours	229.4	211.9	201.5	204.0	155.0	114.0	117.8	114.7	108.0	145.7	189.0	226.3	2,017.3
Mean daily sunshine hours	7.4	7.5	6.5	6.8	5.0	3.8	3.8	3.7	3.6	4.7	6.3	7.3	5.5
Source 1: World Meteorological Organization
Source 2: Office of Water Management and Hydrology, Royal Irrigation Department (sun 1981–2010) (extremes)
