= CMKL University =

Higher Education and Research Institution

Coordinates: 13°43′39″N 100°46′26″E

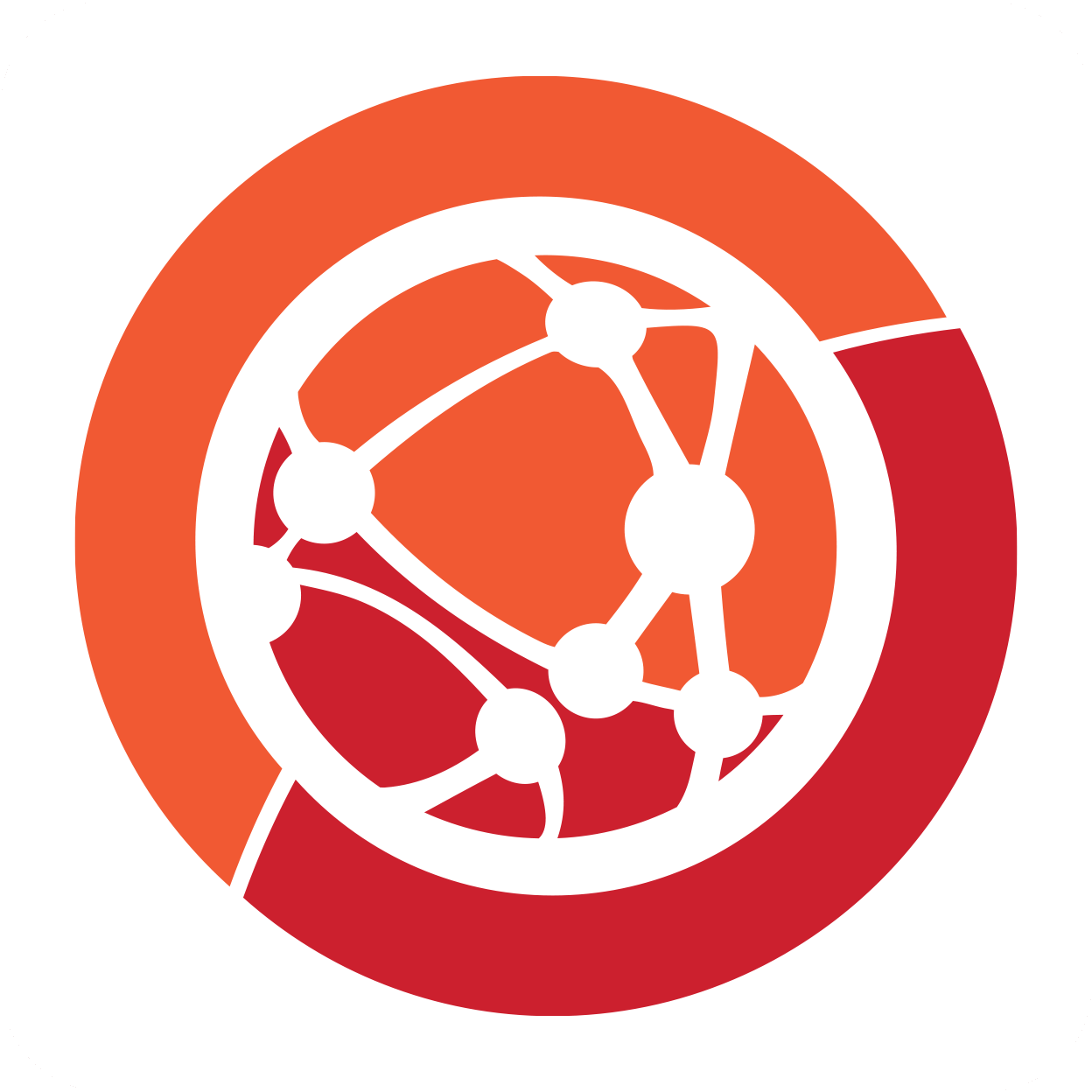
- CMKL University Logo
- Motto: Enabling Endless Possibilities
- Established: October 25, 2017
- Chairman: Surakiart Sathirathai
- Chancellor: Associate Professor Supan Tungjitkusolmun
- Location: Located in King Mongkut's Institute of Technology Ladkrabang: 1 Soi Chalongkrung 1 Ladkrabang Bangkok Thailand 10520
- Colors: ████ orange, crimson red
- Website: www.cmkl.ac.th

CMKL University (CMKL, Thai: มหาวิทยาลัยซีเอ็มเคแอล) is a joint collaboration between Carnegie Mellon University and King Mongkut's Institute of Technology Ladkrabang a leading engineering university in Thailand, for the dual-degree graduate programs in Electrical & Computer Engineering (ECE). located in King Mongkut's Institute of Technology Ladkrabang

== History ==
CMKL University is established as a collaboration between Carnegie Mellon University (CMU) and King Mongkut's Institute of Technology Ladkrabang (KMITL) by applying Carnegie Mellon's globally acclaimed research and education programs.

On October 26, 2017, the head of the National Council for Peace and Order Prayut Chan-o-cha got order No.29/2560 from the head of the National Council for Peace and Order about promoting education management by high-potential institutions from abroad. In order to drive educational reform and raise the country's competitiveness by enhancing the knowledge of technology and modern science in the development of the country, especially in The Eastern Economic Corridor (EEC), this order allows the establishment of universities with high-potential institutions through international cooperation.

In October 2017, President Suchatvee Suwansawat, and Assistant Professor Supan Tungjitkusolmun (the President of CMKL University), the academic administration of King Mongkut's Institute of Technology Ladkrabang (KMITL), Teerakiat Jaroensettasin the Minister of Education and teams travelled to Carnegie Mellon University in the United States to sign a contract between Carnegie Mellon University and King Mongkut's Institute of Technology Ladkrabang to jointly establish "CMKL University."

The Senior Administration of Carnegie Mellon University gave the Faculty of King Mongkut's Institute of Technology Ladkrabang a warm welcome. The venue is decorated with the flag of the United States with the flag of Thailand during the signing ceremony. Bagpipes are played, courtesy of the late Andrew Carnegie, founder of Carnegie Mellon University Scottish Americans heritage.

The collaboration between Carnegie Mellon University and King Mongkut's Institute of Technology Ladkrabang is a new page in history. The mission is to present research and education in computing, artificial intelligence, big data, and high-impact research to accelerate digital transformation in Thailand and Southeast Asia.

The university was officially established on October 25, 2017 with Assistant Professor Supan Tangchitkusolman, appointed as the first university president on December 16, 2017 and opening the first branch of the electrical and computer engineering program. In addition, first-time admission to CMKL University for master's and doctoral degree opened in 2018.

In 2022, the university's undergraduate program in Artificial Intelligence and Computer Engineering was opened for the first time.

On May 29, 2022, Surakiart Sathirathai, Chair of the Board of Trustee presided over the graduating ceremony for the first generation of master's degrees. students consisting of 16 Thais and international students.

== Education ==
- Based on the Carnegie Mellon University educational management approach, the student admission system and teaching management have several research projects, including setting graduation criteria. Thus, students may need to conduct part of their studies in the United States.
- The teaching faculties are made up of Carnegie Mellon University professors, some of whom have come to conduct local research in Thailand or through a distance learning system Carnegie Mellon University has also certified the local Thai teachers who are available.
- Research supervision is conducted through advisory board made up of Carnegie Mellon University faculty members and the private sector supporting the project.
- Carnegie Mellon University admission will be the main lead in charge of the admissions process, using the same criteria and standards as the United States to admit new students into the programs. Graduates from the Electrical & Computer Engineering (ECE) program would receive a dual degree from both Carnegie Mellon University and King Mongkut's Institute of Technology Ladkrabang

== Academic ==
Courses
Bachelor's degree	Master's degree	Doctoral degree
Artificial Intelligence & Computer Engineering (AiCE)	Artificial Intelligence & Computer Engineering (AiCE); Electrical and Computer Engineering (ECE); Technology and Creative Innovation (TCI)	Artificial Intelligence & Computer Engineering (AiCE); Electrical and Computer Engineering (ECE)
