= Wibool Piyawattanametha =

Professor

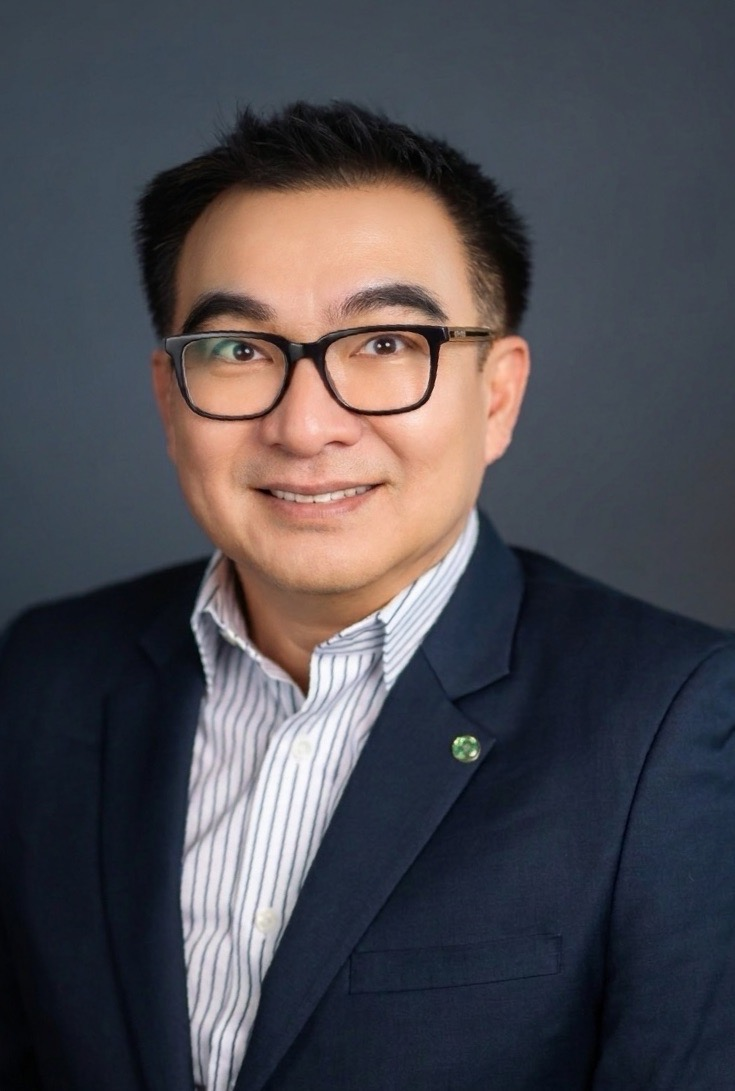
- Wibool in 2026
- Education: KMITL (BS); UCLA (MS, PhD)
- Known for: MEMS-based endoscopic imaging in human
- Scientific career
- Fields: MEMS, optical imaging, NEMS, AI, cancer diagnosis

Wibool Piyawattanametha (Thai: วิบูลย์ ปิยวัฒนเมธา, RTGS: Wibun Piyawatthanametha) is the head of Advanced Imaging Research (AIR) Center, King Mongkut's Institute of Technology Ladkrabang, Thailand.

== Education ==
Piyawattanametha completed his Bachelor of Electronics Engineering (magna cum laude) from the King Mongkut's Institute of Technology Ladkrabang, Bangkok, Thailand. He completed his post graduate degrees in Electrical engineering from University of California, Los Angeles, USA in 1999 (MS) and 2004 (PhD).

== Career ==
Piyawattanametha worked as a senior scientist and later became a research associate at Stanford University's Bio-X Program. He was a director of the advanced imaging research center and an adjunct professor in department of internal medicine at Chulalongkorn University, Faculty of medicine, Thailand from 2009 until 2014. He was a Fraunhofer Bessel awardee which provided him an opportunity to work as a technology consultant in microsystem technology at Fraunhofer IPMS, Dresden, Germany.

He is the head of Advanced Imaging Research (AIR) Center, King Mongkut's Institute of Technology Ladkrabang, Thailand. He is also an adjunct professor at Institute for Quantitative Health Science & Engineering, Michigan State University, US.

=== Committee and conference connections ===
He co-founded and served on the executive board of the Global Young Academy (GYA) in Berlin, Germany, from 2010 to 2012. He is a current conference chairman for the Society of Photo-Optical Instrumentation Engineers (SPIE) in MOEMS and Miniaturized Systems XIII of The Photonics West Conference in California, USA. He served as a committee member on Addressing Inaccurate and Misleading Information about Biological Threats through Scientific Collaboration and Communication, The National Academies of Sciences, Engineering, and Medicine, Washington DC, USA, from 2021 to 2022.

== Research ==
Piyawattanametha's research interests are in the fields of micro-electromechanical systems (MEMS), cancer diagnosis, molecular imaging, AI, optical microscopy, and nanotechnology.

== Awards and honors ==
- 2010 – Member of the Institute of Electrical and Electronics Engineers (IEEE).
- 2011 – Member of the Optical Society of America (OSA).
- 2013 – Awarded Young Scientists Award from the World Economic Forum (WEF), Geneva, Switzerland.
- 2013 – Awarded the Fraunhofer-Bessel Research Award from the Alexander von Humboldt Foundation, Berlin, Germany.
- 2015 – Awarded the Newton Fund Researcher Links from the British Council, United Kingdom.
- 2016 – Recognized on Times Higher Education Ranking Website as a notable KMITL Alumni.
- 2019 – Invited to be on a session at the World Science Forum, Budapest, Hungary.
- 2021 – Elevated to the Society of Photo-Optical Instrumentation Engineers (SPIE) Fellow Status.
