= King Mongkut's Institute of Technology Ladkrabang =

University in Bangkok, Thailand

Coordinates: 13°43′36″N 100°46′48″E

- สถาบันเทคโนโลยีพระจอมเกล้าเจ้าคุณทหารลาดกระบัง
- Motto: การศึกษาวิจัยด้านวิทยาศาสตร์และเทคโนโลยีเป็นรากฐานของการพัฒนาประเทศ (transl. Education and research on science and technology form the basis of national development)
- Type: Autonomous public university
- Established: 1960
- Affiliations: ASAIHL
- President: Komsan Maleesee
- Royal conferrer: Maha Chakri Sirindhorn, Princess Royal of Thailand on behalf of the King
- Undergraduates: 5500
- Postgraduates: 2,000-3,000
- Location: Bangkok, Thailand
- Campus: Suburban
- Colors: Orange; White
- Website: www.kmitl.ac.th

King Mongkut's Institute of Technology Ladkrabang (KMITL or KMIT Ladkrabang for short) is a research and educational institution in Thailand. It is situated in Lat Krabang District, Bangkok, approximately 30 kilometres (20 mi) east of the city center. The university consists of nine faculties: engineering, architecture, science, industrial education and technology, agricultural technology, information technology, food industry, liberal arts, and medicine.

== History ==
King Mongkut statue at KMITL

KMITL was founded in 1960 in Nonthaburi province as a telecommunications training center under the technical support of the Japanese government; the center was later named the Nonthaburi Institute of Telecommunications. After moving to a new location at Lat Krabang near Suvarnabhumi Airport, the campus became King Mongkut's Institute of Technology Ladkrabang.

Engineering began at KMITL in 1960 with a course on telecommunications engineering.

Since a technical cooperation agreement (August 1960-August 1965) was reached between the Japanese and Thai governments in 1960 to establish a telecommunications training center in Thailand, Japan has continued the cooperation over the course of 40 years. The telecommunications training center became a three-year specialty college in 1964, and then in 1971 joined two other colleges and rose to the ranks of an institute of technology. Part of the school moved to the Ladkrabang campus, and architecture, industrial education/science, and agricultural technology departments were established.

On the Japanese side, Tokai University (1977), Tokyo Institute of Technology (1992) and University of Electro-Communications (1997) concluded academic exchange agreements with the school and assisted with such things as the expansion of the university, human resource development and research promotion as part of second phase (December 1978-August 1983) and third phase (April 1988-March 1993) "Project-type Technical Cooperation" projects. A Japanese corporation funded scholarship system was established (1971), as well as practical factory-based training (1977), a construction scholarship system (1989), etc. Thus, actual cooperation activities involving linkages with industry as well as things like the start of an invitation program to the Institute for Posts and Telecommunications Policy and a human resource exchange with a public institution were promoted.

In 1982 KMITL launched the nation's first doctoral degree in electrical engineering and awarded a doctorate in electrical engineering to Dr. Chom Kimpan, who also earned the first Doctor of Engineering granted by a Thai university.

Through the "Partners Project" (1992), using a satellite launched by Japan, there were joint experiments in applied technology (areas such as distance medicine, distance education, computer networking, satellite broadcast, and joint development of a human resource training system using distance education, as well as the implementation of a continuation project called the "Post-Partners Project" (1996).

Besides this, as using the developed skills and facilities for the benefit of other developing countries, JICA has been active in supporting KMITL in organizing "third-country training" in information technology (started in 1978; presently known as the Japan-Thai Partnership Program, JTTP; having completed 11 programs with 13 courses established), dispatched KMITL professors to the engineering department of National University of Laos and supported KMITL's acceptance of research students from universities in Laos.

More recently KMITL has partnered with Thailand Advanced Institute of Science and Technology, a joint effort among Tokyo Institute of Technology, Thailand National Science and Technology Development Agency, KMITL and SIIT to offer international master's degree in Automotive Engineering. From its inception, KMITL has grown to include seven faculties and affiliated research centers.

At present, KMITL has been recognized as one of the science and technology universities in Thailand. This could be because of Japan's long-term and ongoing assistance; comprehensive assistance to the university, industry and each level of government; the significant influence of early graduates of study abroad programs in Japan. In the future, one can expect continued development through KMITL's participation in the Southeast Asia Engineering Education Network (SEED-NET) and strengthening of links with other higher education institutions.

In 2017, Carnegie Mellon University set up a joint institute with KMITL with the support of the Office of the Higher Education Commission. This was named CMKL University and first opened for student admissions in the 2018 academic year.

== Faculties and departments ==
- KMITL Business School (KBS)
  - International Programs
    - Doctor of Philosophy in Industrial Business Administration
    - Master of Business Administration
    - Bachelor of Business Administration
      - Innovation & Technological Marketing
      - Global Business & Financial Management
      - Digital Logistics & Supply Chain Management
    - Bachelor of Business Administration in Global Entrepreneurship
  - Thai-language Programs
    - Doctor of Philosophy in Business Administration
    - Master of Business Administration
    - Bachelor of Business Administration
      - Innovative Industrial Management
      - Management and Innovative Entrepreneurship
    - Bachelor of Business Administration in Digital Transformation and Technology Management
    - Bachelor of Arts in Business Economics and Management
- Faculty of Engineering
  - Department of Agricultural Engineering
  - Department of Biomedical Engineering
  - Department of Chemical Engineering
  - Department of Civil Engineering
  - Department of Computer Engineering
  - Department of Electrical Engineering
  - Department of Electronics Engineering
  - Department of Food Engineering
  - Department of Industrial Engineering
  - Department of Instrumentation Engineering
  - Department of Mechanical Engineering
  - Department of Telecommunication Engineering
- Faculty of Architecture
  - Department of Architecture
  - Department of Interior Architecture
  - Department of Industrial Design
    - Industrial Design
    - 3D-Based Communication Design
  - Department of Communication Arts and Design
    - Communication Design
    - Film and Video
    - Photography
  - Department of Fine Arts
    - Painting
    - Sculpture
    - Printmaking
  - Department of Urban and Environmental Planning
- Faculty of Science
  - Department of Biology
  - Department of Chemistry
  - Department of Computer Science
  - Department of Mathematics
  - Department of Physics
  - Department of Statistics
- Faculty of Industrial Education
  - Department of Engineering Education
  - Department of Architecture Education
  - Department of Agricultural Education
  - Department of Industrial Education
  - School of Liberal Arts
    - Japanese
    - English
- Faculty of Agricultural Technology
  - Department of Agronomy
  - Department of Horticulture
  - Department of Animal Production Technology
  - Department of Animal Science
  - Department of Agricultural Development
    - Agricultural Development
    - Agricultural Communication
  - Department of Soil Science
  - Department of Plant Pest Management
- Faculty of Agro-Industry
  - Department of Agricultural Industry
  - Department of Fermentation Technology
  - Department of Food process Engineering
- Faculty of Information Technology
- Faculty of International College
  - Department of Software Engineering
  - Department of Engineering and Technology Management
- College of Advanced Manufacturing Innovation (AMI)
- Faculty of Medicine

== Centers and services ==
=== Research Center for Communication and Information Technology (ReCCIT) ===
The KMITL Research Center for Communication and Information Technology (ReCCIT) project is the fourth "project-type technical cooperation" project implemented at KMITL and has as its goals strengthening the center's research and development capacity and the graduate school program.

The implementing partner organizations are the Ministry of University Affairs, KMITL, and a Japan-based advisory committee (Ministry of Internal Affairs and Communications or formerly Ministry of Public Management, Home Affairs, Posts and Telecommunications; Tokyo Institute of Technology; Tokai University) has been established. Through the dispatch of experts in information technology, technical training of overseas participants, provision of research and educational equipment, the goals of the project are being pursued:

- establishment of an information technology research center
- strengthening of graduate school programs in the field of information technology at the Center and other research labs that are the targets of the cooperation.

Through these research facilities, KMITL maintains creative partnerships with government and private industry.

=== Industry/University Cooperative Research Center in Data Storage Technology and Applications ===
The I/UCRC in Data Storage Technology and Applications or iDSTA is formed under partnership between KMITL and NECTEC under the Thailand's Hard Disk Drive Competitiveness Enhancement Program. The aim is to increase research and development activities in this area and to enhance cooperation among researchers and between the researchers and the HDD industry in Thailand.

- Advanced Research Center for Photonics
- Nanotechnology Research Center (in co-operation with NANOTECH of NSTDA)
- Business Incubator Center
- Electronics Research Center
- Computer Research and Service Center
- Electrical and Electronic Products Testing Center (PTEC) established under the co-operation of NSTDA and KMITL
- Engineering Service and Development Center
- Scientific Instruments Service Centre (SISC)
- Engineering Research Park

== Campuses ==
- King Mongkut's Institute of Technology Ladkrabang
- King Mongkut's Institute of Technology Ladkrabang Prince of Chumphon Campus

== Notable faculty and alumni ==
- Pakorn Peetathawatchai - President, The Stock Exchange of Thailand
- Sumeth Damrongchaitham - CEO and President, Thai Airways
- Punya Thitimajshima, co-inventor of Turbo code, Shannon limit-approaching code and the recipient of the 1998 IEEE Information Theory Society Golden Jubilee Award and Former Professor of Telecommunication Engineering, KMITL
- Pirada Techavijit, first Thai to space, selected by Axe Apollo Space Academy
- Saravoot Yoovidhya, youngest son of tycoon Chaleo Yoovidhya and Managing Director of The Red Bull Beverage Co., Ltd.
- Suchatvee Suwansawat, former president of King Mongkut's Institute of Technology Ladkrabang (KMITL), former president of Engineering Institute of Thailand, Council Member of University Council of Rajamangala University of Technology Srivijaya, Rangsit University and Nakhonratchasima Rajabhat University
- Wanpracha Chaovalitwongse, Professor of Industrial Engineering, 21st Century Leadership Chair in Engineering, and Co-Director of the Institute of Advanced Data Analytics., The University of Arkansas, USA
- Agachai Sumalee, APEC Science Prize winner, professor of Civil and Transportation Engineering at Hong Kong Polytechnic University, China
- Thanwa Laohasiriwong, former IBM Country General Manager
- Vatsun Thirapatarapong, managing director for Cisco (Thailand)
- Chaiwat Kovavisarach, CEO, Bangchak Petroleum Public Company
- Pitipan Tepartimargorn, COO and senior executive vice president at PTT Public Co. Ltd
- Bundit Sapienchai, senior executive vice president at Bangchak Petroleum Public Co., Ltd
- Itti Palangkool, pop rock singer during the 1990s
- Kongdej Jaturanrasamee, Thai screenwriter and film director
- Wibool Piyawattanametha, "Top 40 Under 40 Young Scientist" selected by the World Economic Forum
- Sermsak Jaruwatanadilok, NASA scientist at Jet Propulsion Laboratory
- Dusit Niyato, Professor of Computer Science, School of Computer Science and Engineering (SCSE) and School of Physical and Mathematical Sciences (SPMS) at the Nanyang Technological University and a Fellow of IEEE.
- Yaowalak Traisurat, Miss Thailand Universe 2003
- Kokaew Pikulthong, former member of Parliament and leader of National United Front of Democracy Against Dictatorship
- Songkarn Chitsuthipakorn, former member of Parliament
- Kongdej Jaturanrasamee, screenwriter and film director
- Somsak Thepsutin, former vice leader of the Thai Rak Thai Party and former deputy prime minister, former Minister of Labour and Social Welfare, and former Minister of Industry
- Srimuang Charoensiri, former Minister of Education and senator
- Putthi Tulayathun, vice president, Mercedes-Benz (Thailand)
- Chaiyot Piyawannara, president and country manager, ABB (Thailand)
- Pimuk Simaroj, president of SUSCO Dealers Ltd, former Member of Parliament
- Anusorn Kraiwatnussorn, former Member of Parliament and Vice Minister of Labour
- Somsak Phurisrisak, Minister of Tourism and Sports, Former Governor of Suphan Buri
- Songsak Premsuk, managing director of Voice TV
- Samai Anuwatkasem, Chairman of the Board of Metropolitan Waterworks Authority
- Nath Vongpanich - CEO of Central Familymart Company Limited
- Yongkiat Kitaphanich - CEO and Executive Director, Somboon Advance Technology PCL
- Kitisak Sriprasert - CEO and President of CAT Telecom
- Jirayuth Rungsritong - Former CEO and President of CAT Telecom
- Arnon Tubtiang - Former CEO of TOT Public Company
- Nopporn Witoonchart - CEO and Co-founder of Siam Future Development
- Pongchai Amatanon - CEO and Founder of Forth Corporation
- Polsak Lertputipinyo - CEO and Co-Founder, Stars Microelectronics (Thailand) PCL
- Pairash Thajchayapong - 2005 PICMET Leadership in Technology Management Award Recipient, Outstanding Scientist of 1991, former C11 Professor of Computer Engineering, former Permanent Secretary of the Ministry of Science and Technology, President of the National Science & Technology Development Agency (NSTDA), and former KMITL Rector
- Sitthichai Pookaiyaudom - IEEE Fellow, Minister of Information and Communication Technology, Former President of Mahanakorn University of Technology, former Professor of Electronics Engineering and former Dean of the School of Engineering and of Graduate Studies
- Sujate Jantarang - President of Mahanakorn University of Technology
- Chalermek Intanagonwiwat - Computer Scientist known for his work on directed diffusion
- Wanchat Padungrat - Founder of Pantip.com
- Chusak Limsakul - President of Prince of Songkla University
- Jareerat Petsom - Environmental advocate, host, director, scriptwriter and beauty pageant titleholder won Miss Earth Thailand 2021 and Miss Earth - Fire 2021
- Naravit Lertratkosum - Actor, Model, Singer.
- Natachai Boonprasert - Actor, Model, Singer
- Dechchart Tasilp - Actor, Singer.

== Sister universities ==
- Taiwan
  - National Formosa University
