= Suchatvee Suwansawat =

Thai politician, engineer and academic (born 1972)

- สุชัชวีร์ สุวรรณสวัสดิ์
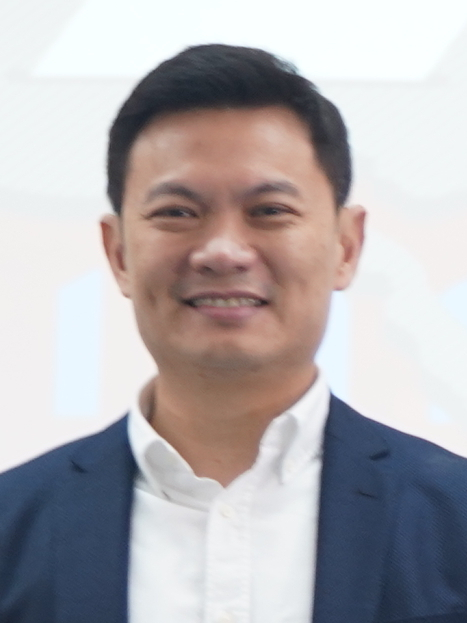
- Suchatvee in 2022

President of King Mongkut's Institute of Technology Ladkrabang
- In office 2 October 2015 – 12 December 2021
- Preceded by: Monai Krairuek
- Succeeded by: Anuwat Jangwanichloet (acting)

Personal details
- Born: 20 April 1972 (age 54) Chonburi, Thailand
- Party: Thai Kao Mai (2025–present)
- Other political affiliations: Democrat (2021–2025)
- Spouse: Sawita Suwansawat (née Pitawan)
- Education: King Mongkut's Institute of Technology Ladkrabang (B.E.); University of Wisconsin-Madison (M.S.); Massachusetts Institute of Technology (M.S.), (Sc.D.)
- Occupation: Politician; Engineer; Academic
- Website: suchatvee.org

Suchatvee Suwansawat (Thai: สุชัชวีร์ สุวรรณสวัสดิ์, RTGS: Suchatwi Suwansawat; born 20 April 1972) is a professor of Civil Engineering at King Mongkut's Institute of Technology Ladkrabang (KMITL), where he served as the president of institute from 2015 to 2021. In December 2021, he announced his intention to contest in the 2022 Bangkok gubernatorial election as a candidate for the Democrat Party. He came in a distant second place. As of January 2026, he is the Prime Minister candidate of the Thai Kao Mai Party.

== Early life and education ==
Suchatvee was born on 20 April 1972 at Chonburi's Si Racha, eastern Thailand, but grew up in the neighbouring Rayong. Suchatvee father and mother worked as a teacher at vocational school.

Suchatvee attended Rayongwittayakom School before graduating from King Mongkut's Institute of Technology Ladkrabang (KMITL) with a Bachelor of Construction Engineering.

At the age of 20, Suchatvee envisioned an underground transport system for the capital, submitting "Bangkok's Subway Tunnel Design" as his final undergraduate project.

He subsequently went on to complete a Master of Science degree in Civil Engineering at the University of Wisconsin–Madison, Master of Science in Technology and Policy at Massachusetts Institute of Technology(MIT). and Doctor of Science in Geotechnical Engineering at Massachusetts Institute of Technology (MIT). He received Royal Thai Government fellowship to pursue his graduate study and was a Microsoft scholar while studying at MIT.

== Professional career ==
=== King Mongkut's Institute of Technology Ladkrabang ===
Suchatvee began his career as a lecturer of engineering at King Mongkut's Institute of Technology Ladkrabang in 2003 based on his expertise in geotechnical engineering, underground and tunnel construction. He was appointed as assistant president the same year.

In 2010 he was appointed professor of civil engineering at KMITL. and dean of engineering faculty the same year.

He was appointed president of KMITL first term in 2015 and second term in 2019. During his time as president he contributed to the development of the institute such as the Research and Education collaboration between Carnegie Mellon University and KMITL, resulting the founding of CMKL University in 2017. He signed a memorandum of understanding between Kosen Institute and KMITL to develop manpower in engineering technology and innovation. He helped establish coding school 42 Bangkok through a memorandum of understanding between the institute and Ecole 42 Paris in 2019. He presided over a foundation to create King Mongkut Chaokhun Tahan Hospital. He pushed for the establishment of Faculty of Medicine KMITL, and King Mongkut's Institute of Technology Ladkrabang International Demonstration School (KMIDS).

He has served as Council Member of University Council of Rajamangala University of Technology Srivijaya, Rangsit University and Nakhonratchasima Rajabhat University

=== Education ===
Suchatvee was elected Chairperson of the Council of University Presidents of Thailand for two consecutive terms. During his tenure from 2017 to 2020 Thai university admission system was changed to reduce inequality. He was also elected President of the Association of Southeast Asian Institutions of Higher Learning for 2019-2020.

=== Civil Engineer ===
During his studies at MIT, Suchatvee returned to Thailand from 1999-2000 to work as a geotechnical engineering specialist in the Bangkok MRTA project. In that time he founded the Young Member Committee of Engineering Institute of Thailand, where he served as its first chairperson. He also became a member of the Geotechnical Engineering Committee of the Engineering Institute of Thailand in 1999. He was a member of the government panel who investigated the damage of runways and tarmacs at Bangkok's new Suvarnabhumi Airport. He is the Chairman of Thailand Underground and Tunneling Group (TUTG) in 2012, a national member of the International Tunneling and Underground Space Association (ITA-AITES), an organization that promotes underground use for human and environmental benefits.

In 2014, he was elected Chairman of Committee of the Engineering Institute of Thailand with term form 2014-2016.

Suchatvee was appointed as a board member of The Council of Engineers Thailand (COE). In 2015. He was later elected Chairman of The Council of Engineers Thailand in 2019. He resigned in 2021 to campaign for the 2022 Bangkok gubernatorial election.

=== Board Members ===
He served on Board members and spokesperson for Board of State Railway of Thailand in 2008 Since 2012 he served as Chairman of National Housing Authority (Thailand). which has plans to launch 22 projects with 7,812 units worth 4.7 billion baht in July 2013. Suchatvee has served Bangkok Mass Transit Authority (BMTA) the Executive Board of the organization has resolution to appoint him to take the Position as Chairman of the Sub-Committee on Promotion of Good Corporate Governance in 2014. and Board members of Metropolitan Electricity Authority (MEA) in 2018.

== Political career ==
On 13 December 2021, in a meeting of the Democrat Party Executive Committee, Suchatvee was unanimously approved as the party's candidate for the 2022 Bangkok gubernatorial election. Although not elected, he got second place with 254,723 votes (9.60%).

In September 2022 Suchatvee has been named one of the candidates for the Democrat Party in Bangkok. He will lead its education campaign efforts for the next general election. In October 2022 party leader Jurin Laksanawisit appointed him to head its policy team for Bangkok to prepare for the 2023 general election. He was 12th party-list candidate.

On July 4, 2025, he resigned from the Democrat Party. It is speculated that he will join forces with Khunying Kalaya Sophonpanich, a prominent member of the Democrat Party, to establish a new political party — Thai Kao Mai (ไทยก้าวใหม่; "The Progressive Thai Party"), with a primary focus on education reform as a catalyst for national transformation.

That period marked what could be considered the most critical time in the Democrat Party's history. Prior to his resignation, several party members had already stepped down following the 2023 general election, in which the Democrats won only 25 seats, the lowest in the party’s nearly 80-year history (he himself was not elected). The party was also plagued by internal conflicts, as many members disagreed with the direction set by the new executive committee, led by party leader Chalermchai Sri-on and secretary-general Det-it Khaothong, who had resolved to bring the party into a coalition government under prime minister Paetongtarn Shinawatra, the daughter of former prime minister Thaksin Shinawatra, whose lineage and political camp have traditionally been ideological rivals of the Democrats.

As of January 2026, he is running for Prime Minister as a candidate of the Thai Kao Mai Party, although the party failed to win a single seat in the election.

== Royal decorations ==
- 2017 – Knight Commander (Second Class) of The Most Exalted Order of the White Elephant
- 2022 – Knight Grand Cross (First Class) of The Most Noble Order of the Crown of Thailand
