= Russ Jalichandra =

Thai diplomat

- รัศม์ ชาลีจันทร์

Vice Minister for Foreign Affairs
- Incumbent
- Assumed office 13 September 2023
- Minister: Maris Sangiampongsa

Russ Jalichandra (Thai: รัศม์ ชาลีจันทร์; RTGS: Rat Chalichan) is a Thai diplomat, serving as Vice Minister for Foreign Affairs since 2023. He previously served as the Thai Ambassador to Kazakhstan, Kyrgyzstan, and Tajikistan from 2019 to 2020.

== Career ==
Russ was appointed advisor to the Dice Minister for Foreign Affairs on 13 September 2023. Following the February 2025 deportation of Uyghurs in Thailand, Russ confirmed the deportation was done in order to avert "retaliation" by China.
