= Movement Party (Thailand) =

Political party in Thailand

Movement Party พรรคพลวัต
- Leader: Vacant
- Secretary-General: Sorayuth Phet-trakul
- Spokesperson: Kulthorn Kasemsant
- Founded: 17 December 2025
- Split from: Fair Party; People’s (faction)
- Headquarters: 199/78 Vibhavadi Rangsit Road, Samsen Nai, Phaya Thai, Bangkok 10400
- Membership: 14,050
- Colors: Green
- Slogan: Smart Support and Sincere
- House of Representatives: 0 / 500

The Movement Party (Thai: พรรคพลวัต; RTGS: Phak Phlawat) is a Thai political party registered with the Election Commission of Thailand. The party's headquarters are located in the Phaya Thai District of Bangkok. The party was officially launched on 17 December 2025.

== History ==
In December 2025, Kannavee Suebsang resigned from the Fair Party and announced plans to establish the Phlawat Party. During the announcement, he stated the party's strategic goal was to participate in a coalition government to effectively implement its policies, rather than remaining in the opposition. The party held its official inauguration on 17 December 2025.

== Administration ==
The party assembly elected Kannavee Suebsang as Party Leader, with Suraphan Waiyakorn serving as Deputy Leader. Sorayuth Phet-trakul was appointed Secretary-General, and Kulthorn Kasemsant was named Party Spokesperson.

== Executive Committee ==
The founding executive committee of the Phlawat Party consists of the following members:

Position	Name
Leader	Kannavee Suebsang
Deputy Leader	Suraphan Waiyakorn
Secretary-General	Sorayuth Phet-trakul
Treasurer	Duangchan Phromwi-in
Registrar	Phattranit Phanitthananchai
Spokesperson	Kulthorn Kasemsant

== List of Party Leaders ==
No.	Portrait	Name	Term Start	Term End	Notes
1		Kannavee Suebsang	15 December 2025	Incumbent	Founding Leader
