= Sitthichai Pokai-udom =

Thai inventor and politician

Sitthichai Pokai-udom (Thai: สิทธิชัย โภไคยอุดม, born 10 November 1948) is a Thai inventor and politician. He was appointed as Minister of the Ministry of Information and Communication Technology of Thailand in 2006 by a military junta. He founded the Mahanakorn University of Technology in 1990. From 1990 to 1998, he was a visiting professor at the University of London's Imperial College of Science, Technology and Medicine. From 1984 to 1986, he was appointed to the board of directors of the Communications Authority of Thailand (now CAT Telecom). He is married to Pornpan Mahattananon Pookaiyaudom and has one son and two daughters. He is the son of a wealthy Shanghainese general, C.L. Shin, who fought for Chiang Kai-shek and left China for Thailand in 1948. He changed his Chinese name to a Thai one at the age of 10.

== Education ==
Sitthichai studied high school at Saint John's School in Bangkok. Sitthichai received the Colombo Plan scholarship and studied at the University of New South Wales, where he graduated with a Bachelor of Engineering in 1972. He graduated with a PhD in Solid State Electronics from the University of New South Wales in 1975.

== Academic career ==
=== King Mongkut's Institute of Technology Ladkrabang ===
From 1976 to 1990, Sitthichai taught at King Mongkut's Institute of Technology Ladkrabang (KMITL). He was the head of the Electronics Engineering Department from 1978 to 1982, associate dean of the Faculty of Engineering from 1982 to 1984, dean of the Faculty of Engineering from 1984 to 1988, and dean of the Faculty of Graduate Study from 1988 to 1990.

During his time at KMITL, Sitthichai developed a rice moisture monitor based on electrical capacitance. At the time, General Surayud Chulanont was in charge of the army's rice promotion project, and the two men met. General Surayud had Sitthichai's device mass-produced and rice mills and markets were forced to buy it. Surayud's Minister of Science and Technology, Yongyuth Yutthawong, later noted that "[the device] never worked. It was like the taxis and hats. Every taxi driver was ordered to buy a hat, but they never wore it. The government forced everyone to buy these machines and they lay unused at the rice mills because nobody educated them about the system."

=== Mahanakorn University of Technology ===
Sitthichai founded the Mahanakorn University of Technology in 1990 and became its first rector.

== Open source software ==
A military junta headed by Generals Sonthi Boonratkalin and Surayud Chulanont overthrew the elected government of Thaksin Shinawatra on 19 September 2006. Surayud appointed Sitthichai, who he had previously known while working for the Army's rice project, as Minister of Information and Communication Technologies (ICT).

ICT Minister Sitthichai became a vocal critic of open source software. In an interview, he noted, "With open source, there is no intellectual property. Anyone can use it and all your ideas become public domain. If nobody can make money from it, there will be no development and open source software quickly becomes outdated... As a programmer, if I can write good code, why should I give it away? Thailand can do good source code without open source."

== Foreign technology ==
Sitthichai was a vocal opponent of foreign technology. In a speech at the Comworld 2007 fair at Siam Paragon shopping center, he said that it was wrong of Thai people to admire modern technology which was not developed by Thai people. "It is a fake development because the country is now getting worse as almost everything at the exhibition here is imported and nothing is made by Thais," he said.

== Inventions ==
Sitthichai invented the meter used in Bangkok taxis. He also developed a euthanasia device that pumps carbon monoxide into a room.

== Censorship ==
Sitthichai ordered a nationwide ban of the website YouTube on 4 April 2007. The reason for the ban was stated to be a distasteful video of King Bhumibol Adulyadej.

== Hobbies ==
Sitthichai is an avid collector of firearms. He regularly carries a .45 caliber pistol.

== See also ==
- 2006 Thailand coup
- Thailand 2006 interim civilian government
- Surayud Chulanont
