= Mahanakorn University of Technology =

Thai university

Coordinates: 13.8441°N 100.8563°E

- มหาวิทยาลัยเทคโนโลยีมหานคร
- Motto: Knowledge is Power
- Type: Private
- Established: February 27, 1990
- Founders: Sitthichai Pookaiyaudom
- Location: Bangkok, Thailand
- Website: www.mut.ac.th

Mahanakorn University of Technology (Thai: มหาวิทยาลัยเทคโนโลยีมหานคร, short MUT) is a university in Thailand. The university was established on February 27, 1990 at Nong Chok District, Bangkok. as Mahanakorn College by Prof. Dr. Sitthichai Pookaiyaudom, former Dean of King Mongkut's Institute of Technology Ladkrabang. The objective was to train engineering students in response to the severe shortage of engineers. MUT was then promoted to full university status under the new name Mahanakorn University of Technology. It is the first and still the only university in the country that operates its own low-orbit microsatellite (TMSAT).

== Faculties ==
There are four faculties,

- Engineering,
- Information Science and Technology,
- Veterinary Medicine and
- Business Administration.

Doctoral and master's degree programs are offered in addition to bachelor's degree courses.

The main campus of the university is located in Nong chok District, Bangkok. Another campus is located at Vanit2 Building on New Petchaburi Road, Central Bangkok.

== Overseas cooperation ==
Cooperation with oversea universities has played an important role in the development of MUT. Partnerships has been established with:

- Korean Advanced Institute of Science and Technology, South Korea,
- The University of New South Wales, Australia,
- University of Sydney, Australia,
- Imperial College London, England,
- The University of Surrey, England,
- Coventry University, England,
- University of Veterinary Medicine Hanover, Germany.

MUT and Imperial College (London, England) has jointly established an electronic circuit design laboratory in Imperial College. The centre was opened by Her Royal Highness Princess Royal, daughter of Her Majesty Queen Elizabeth II. It is a research centre for Thai doctoral students and a gateway for Thai industry to access advances in Microelectronics.

== Notable activities ==
MUT has designed and constructed a microsatellite. The satellite was built in the University of Surrey by a team of MUT engineers and launched in March 1998. The satellite was named "Thai Paht" by His Majesty King Bhumibol. It is controlled from the ground station on the Nong Chok campus. The station has opened educational centre for communication engineering students and a research centre in satellite engineering. Images downloaded from the satellites are used in the study of regional and environmental features. A program of further satellite construction is underway in cooperation with Chinese and Korean satellite research institutes.

Mahanakorn has established itself as notable research centre nationally and worldwide. MUT staffs have published the largest number of articles among Thai academics in international engineering journals. Several projects have also been recognized for their contribution to society such as mine detector, unmanned aerial vehicle and water filer.

== International and national recognitions ==
MUT was ranked 36th by Asia Week Magazine in category of Asian Best Science and Technology Institution within ten years after it was founded. MUT's latest achievement is to accomplish a score of 4.86 out of 5 which is the highest score in the category of Research University in an assessment by the office for National Education Standards and Quality Assessment (ONESQA), a public organization set up to assess the performance of all educational institutions from schools to universities, in two categories: research and learning qualities and the quality of graduates.
