= Rayongwittayakom School =

School in Rayong, Thailand

Coordinates: 12.666994°N 101.273880°E

- โรงเรียนระยองวิทยาคม
- 179, Taksin Maharat Rd, Mueang Rayong District, Rayong 21000

Information
- Former names: Rayongmitobpatump School (1899–1971) Satreeboonsiribumpeng School (1920–1971)
- School type: Public, Co-educational
- Motto: นตฺถิ ปญฺญาสมา อาภา (No light is brighter than wisdom.)
- Established: 5 August 1971
- Grades: Matthayom 1–6 (Grade 7–12)
- Colors: Blue; Yellow
- Website: https://rayongwit.ac.th/

Rayongwittayakom School (Thai: โรงเรียนระยองวิทยาคม), also known colloquially as Rayongwit (Thai: ระยองวิทย์), is a public secondary school located in Rayong, Thailand. It was originally founded as "Rayongmitobpatump School" in 1899 as a provincial primary school, making it the oldest school in Rayong province. It enrolls students from Mathayom 1–6 (grades 7–12).

== History ==
In 1971, the Thai Ministry of Education merged the Rayongmitobpatump School and the Satreeboonsiribumpeng School, with the latter located in today's Anuban Rayong School, to form the new Rayongwittayakom School. In 1971, they allocated teachers and budget for increasing efficiency in management of the school.

Rayongwittayakhom School is located on the original area of Rayongmitobpatump School.

== Curriculum ==
=== Lower Secondary ===
- Science programme, following IPST and POSN guidelines (also known as the "GIFTED" programme) (Classes 1–2)
- SMART COM (Class 3)
- Power of Ten Science (Class 4)
- Regular programme (Classes 5–8)
- English for Integrated Studies (EIS) (Classes 9–11)
- English Program (EP) (Classes 12–14)

=== Upper Secondary ===
==== The Science-Mathematics major ====
- Science, Mathematics, Technology, and Environment (also known as the "Sci-Pro" programme) (Class 1)
- Science, Mathematics, and Computer Science (also known as the "Wit-Com" programme) (Class 2)
- English for Integrated Studies (EIS) (Classes 3–4)
- Preparatory Engineering (Class 5)
- Power of Ten Science (Class 6)
- Science – Mathematics (Classes 7–9)
- English Program (EP), Science – Mathematics (Class 18)

==== The Arts major ====
- English – Mathematics (Class 10)
- Law – Political Science (Class 11)
- Arts – Music – Dramatic Arts, Sports, and Business (Class 12)
- English – Chinese (Plan A) (Class 13)
- English – Chinese (Plan B) (Class 14)
- English – French (Class 15)
- English – Japanese (Class 16)
- English – Korean (Class 17)
- English Program (EP), Arts – Chinese, French, and Japanese (Class 19)

== Extracurricular activities ==
=== Color sports event ===
A major event is the annual sports festival, an event for which each class building spends months in preparation, and includes competitions not only in athletics but also parade and audience displays. There are 6 colors: yellow, purple, red, green, blue, and pink.

=== Love and commitment activity ===
This activity is held on the last day of instruction for students in Mathayom 6 (Grade 12th). In the morning, the director will give flowers to students in Mathayom 6 who pass the quota exam of university.
