= Thai Kao Mai Party =

Thai political party

Thai Kao Mai Party พรรคไทยก้าวใหม่
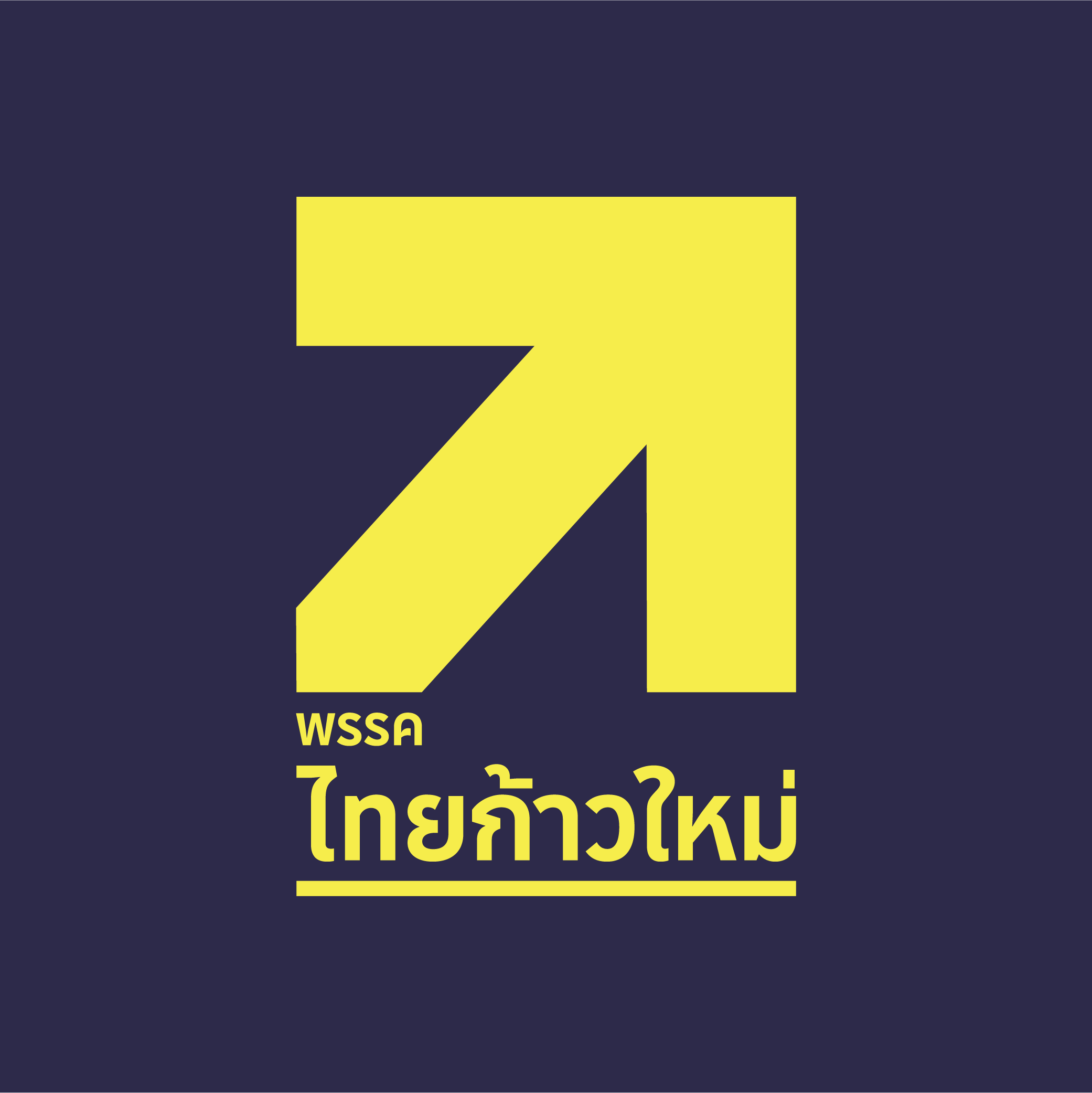
- Abbreviation: TKM
- Leader: Suchatvee Suwansawat
- Chairperson: Kalaya Sophonpanich
- Secretary: Kongkiat Korasut
- Founded: 9 January 2013; 13 years ago as the Thai Forest Land Reclamation Party
- Headquarters: 888 iTower Building, Chatuchak subdistrict, Chatuchak district Bangkok 10900
- Membership (2025): 11,351
- Ideology: Education reform Economic liberalism Green politics
- Colours: yellow
- Slogan: A new step for Thailand to be Strong (ก้าวใหม่ให้ไทยสตรอง)
- House of Representatives: 0 / 500

The Thai Kao Mai Party (TKM, Thai: พรรคไทยก้าวใหม่, RTGS: Phak Thai Kao Mai) It is a Thai political party originally founded in 2013 under the name of the Thai Forest Land Reclamation Party. Currently, Suchatvee Suwansawat is the party leader and Kongkiat Korasut is the party secretary.

== History ==
The Thai Forest Land Reclamation Party was founded on January 9, 2013 by Damrong Pidech, former director-general of the Department of National Parks, Wildlife and Plant Conservation. Damrong and Thiti Kanoktaweetakorn served as the party's first leader and secretary-general. The party took part in the 2014 elections, which were declared void.

The emblem of the Thai Forest Land Reclamation Party from 9 January 2013 – 10 December 2018

=== Thai Forest Conservation Party (1st time) ===
At the 1/2018 Extraordinary General Meeting of the Thai Forest Land Reclamation Party on December 10, 2018, the party decided to change its name from the Thai Forest Land Reclamation Party to the Thai Forest Conservation Party. In the 2019 general elections, the party won two party-list seats and joined a coalition headed by the Phalang Pracharath Party with enough seats to form a government.

On Sunday, November 21, 2021, the 1/2021 General Meeting voted to elect Suchin Pianthong, a former forestry expert, as party leader, replacing Damrong, who had been promoted to party advisory chairman. In addition, the party headquarters was moved to 11 Soi Chokchai 4, Soi 60, Chokchai 4 Road, Lat Phrao Subdistrict, Lat Phrao District. Later, on Thursday, September 22, 2022, Suchin submitted a letter of resignation from the position of party leader.

=== Thai Opportunity Party ===
On Sunday, October 2, 2022, at the 1/2022 Extraordinary General Meeting of the Thai Forest Conservation Party resolved to change the party's name to the Thai Opportunity Party and move the party headquarters to 62, The Millenia Tower, along with the election of a new party executive committee of 9 people, in which the meeting resolved to select Mingkwan Saengsuwan, former Deputy Prime Minister, as a new party leader. Until November 25, 2022, Mingkwan submitted a letter of resignation from the Thai Opportunity Party member, removing him from the position of party leader along with the entire party executive committee.

=== Thai Forest Conservation Party (2nd time)/Forest Conservation Party ===
Later, on January 22, 2023, the Thai Opportunity Party held a general meeting to amend the party regulations, returning to the name "Thai Forest Conservation Party" and moving the party headquarters back to 11 Soi Chokchai 4, Soi 60, Chokchai 4 Road, Lat Phrao Subdistrict, Lat Phrao District, along with electing a new party executive committee. The meeting voted to elect Prasert Apipunya as party leader.

Prasert then submitted a letter of resignation from the party membership on January 17, 2024, which the party was informed of on January 26. This resulted in his out of the position of party leader and the entire party executive committee being out of their positions. Later, on March 17, 2024, the Thai Forest Conservation Party held a meeting to elect a new party executive committee. The meeting voted to elect Udomphan Inthayotha and Rapee Chamnanruea as a new party leader and secretary-general. The party's logo and name were also changed to the Forest Conservation Party.

On July 4, 2025, Udomphan submitted his resignation as party leader, which the party was informed of the same day. This caused the remaining five party executive committee had to leave office as a group, but they will continue to serve until a new party executive committee is election. Rapee, as the party secretary-general, served as acting party leader.

=== Thai Kao Mai Party ===
On July 19, 2025, the Forest Conservation Party held a general meeting to change the party's regulations, changing the party's name to the Thai Kao Mai Party, changing the party's logo, and electing a new 12-member party executive committee. The meeting voted to elect Kongkiat Korrasut and Pinetawee Silpawanich as the new party leader and secretary-general. This change in the party name was in line with news reports on July 4, 2025, that Suchatvee Suwansawat, former Bangkok gubernatorial candidate and former deputy leader of the Democrat Party, had resigned from the Party members and announced the establishment of a political party called the Thai Kao Mai Party. Suchatvee later made it clear that he would not return to the Democrat Party, despite calls for his return to help revive the party after the resignation of Chalermchai Sri-on as party leader. Instead, he stated he was preparing to launch the Thai Kao Mai Party, intending to promote education as a key policy and hold a party meeting within September. Later, on September 19, 2025, Khun Ying Kalaya Sophonpanich submitted a letter of resignation from the Democrat Party members, admitting that she was preparing to join Thai Kao Mai. The Thai Kao Mai Party held a general meeting on September 20, 2025, which elected a new party executive committee with Suchatvee as the new party leader, and voted to move the party headquarters to the iTower building on Vibhavadi Rangsit Road and the party is scheduled to officially launch in 3 October.

== Election results ==
Election	Total seats won	Popular vote	Share of votes	Outcome of election	Election leader
2014	Invalidated	Invalidated	Invalidated	Unconstitutional-nullified	Damrong Pidej
2019	2 / 500	134,816	0.38%	▲2 seats; Junior partner in governing coalition	Damrong Pidej
2023	0 / 500	12,601	0.03%	▼no seats; Opposition	Prasert Aphipunya
