= Kalaya Sophonpanich =

Thai politician and physicist

Khun Ying Kalaya Sophonpanich
- กัลยา โสภณพนิช
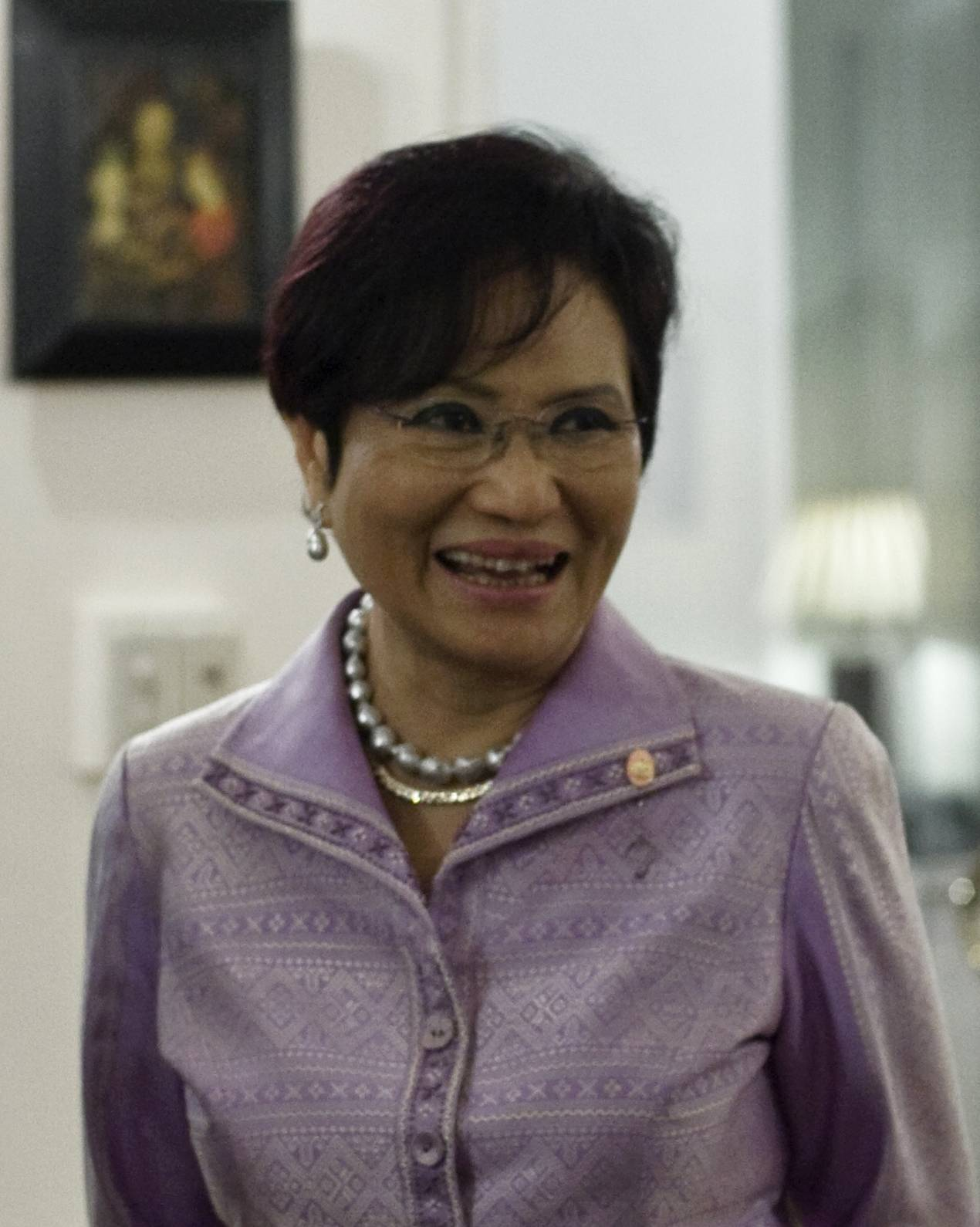
- Kalaya Sophonpanich in 2010

Minister of Science and Technology
- In office 20 December 2008 – 6 June 2010
- Prime Minister: Abhisit Vejjajiva
- Preceded by: Wuttipong Chaisang
- Succeeded by: Virachai Virameteekul

Deputy Minister of Education
- In office 10 July 2019 – 1 September 2023
- Prime Minister: Prayut Chan-o-cha

Personal details
- Born: 21 September 1940 (age 86) Sikhio, Nakhon Ratchasima, Thailand
- Party: Thai Kao Mai (2025–present)
- Other political affiliations: Democrat (2001–2025)
- Spouse: Chote Sophonpanich
- Education: Chulalongkorn University; Imperial College London
- Profession: Physicist

Kalaya Sophonpanich (Thai: กัลยา โสภณพนิช; RTGS: Kanlaya Sophonphanit; Chinese: 龍宛虹; pinyin: Lóng Wǎnhóng; born 21 September 1940) is a Thai physicist and politician who served as the Minister of Science and Technology from 2008 to 2010.

== Early life and education ==
Kalaya was born in poor Thai Chinese family in Nakhon Ratchasima in Isan (northeast region). She married Chote Sophonpanich, the fourth son of well-known magnate Chin Sophonpanich.

She graduated with a Bachelor of Science (Honors) from the Faculty of Science at Chulalongkorn University in 1961, and received a Colombo scholarship to study for a master's degree, also receiving scholarships at doctoral level to read nuclear physics at Imperial College London where she earned a Ph.D. in high-energy nuclear physics in 1970.

== Careers ==
She was a co-founder of the National Electronics and Computer Technology Center (NECTEC) in 1986. Then she was the founder and president of the Prapakarnpanya Foundation for helping Mentally Retarded People of Thailand under royal patronage.

Kalaya is more widely known when applying for the Governor of Bangkok in 2000 as an independent candidate, getting number 4 even though not elected but has gained popularity with the people of Bangkok. Later she became a member of Democrat Party who applied to be a member of the House of Representatives in the elections of 2001 and 2005.

She was appointed Minister of Science and Technology in the 2008 cabinet of Abhisit Vejjajiva. She was replaced by Virachai Virameteekul after the cabinet reshuffle in June 2010.

She was appointed Deputy Minister of Education in the Second Prayut cabinet on 10 July 2019. When the minister, Nataphol Teepsuwan, was removed after being convicted by the Criminal Court in early 2021, she also served as acting minister until the appointment of Trinuch Thienthong.

On 19 September 2025, she resigned from the Democrat Party, announcing her intention to co-found the Thai Kao Mai Party together with Suchatvee Suwansawat, also a former Democrat member.

== Royal decorations ==
- 1987 – Companion (Third Class, lower grade) of the Most Illustrious Order of Chula Chom Klao
- 2009 – Knight Grand Cordon (Special Class) of The Most Exalted Order of the White Elephant
- 2008 – Knight Grand Cordon (Special Class) of The Most Noble Order of the Crown of Thailand
- 1978 – Rama IX's Royal Cypher Medal, 5th Class
- 2009 – Gold Medalist (Sixth Class) of The Most Admirable Order of the Direkgunabhorn
- 2019 – First Class of Boy Scout Citation Medal
- 1950 – King Rama IX Coronation Medal
