= Kannavee Suebsang =

Thai politician

- กัณวีร์ สืบแสง
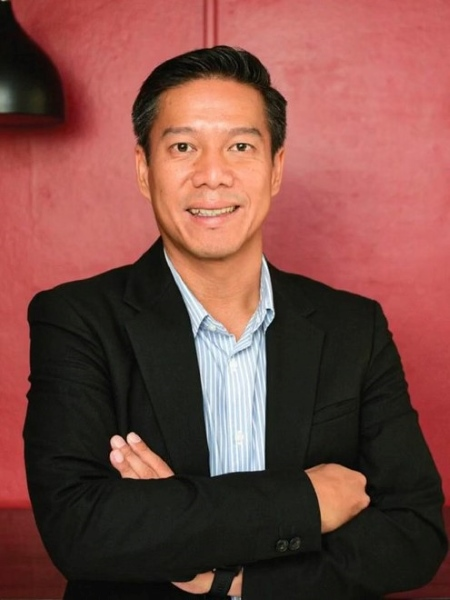

Leader of the Movement Party
- Incumbent
- Assumed office 12 December 2025
- Preceded by: Position established

Member of the House of Representatives
- In office 14 May 2023 – 12 December 2025

Secretary-General of the Fair Party
- In office 21 January 2023 – 3 December 2025

Personal details
- Party: Thai Sang Thai Party (2021–23); Fair Party (2023–25); Movement Party (2025—26)
- Education: Ramkhamhaeng University (BA); University of Oregon (MA)

Kannavee Suebsang (Thai: กัณวีร์ สืบแสง; RTGS: Kannawi Suepsaeng) is a Thai politician, currently serving as leader of the Movement Party Kannavee was member of parliament. He was a secretary-general of the Fair Party until 2025, and was its only member of the party in parliament.

== 2025 Uyghur deportation ==
On 28 February 2025, Kannavee refuted the Thai government's claims that the group of Uyghurs deported to China on 27 February 2025 had returned voluntarily. Kannavee cited a 10 July 2024 meeting with officials from the Ministry of Foreign Affairs, where the officials identified Australia, the United States, and Sweden as offering to resettle the Uyghurs. The US State Department later confirmed their resettlement offers, along with sources from the governments of Australia and Canada, whose governments also confirmed their own resettlement offers, respectively.

Kannavee claimed to receive three letters written jointly by a group of 48 Uyghurs interned at Klongprem Central Prison to the United Nations High Commissioner for Refugees, asking for asylum status. The letters also suggested the group had pleaded for Prime Minister Paetongtarn Shinawatra to deport them to a third county besides China.
