= Galyanivadhanakarun Hospital =

University Hospital in Narathiwat, Thailand

Galyanivadhanakarun Hospital โรงพยาบาลกัลยาณิวัฒนาการุณย์

Geography
- Location: 99 Mu 8, Khok Khian Subdistrict, Mueang Narathiwat District, Narathiwat 96000, Thailand
- Coordinates: 6.454845°N 101.788139°E

Organisation
- Type: Teaching
- Affiliated university: Faculty of Medicine, Princess of Naradhiwas University

Services
- Beds: 22

History
- Opened: 15 December 2014

Links
- Website: hospital.pnu.ac.th
- Lists: Hospitals in Thailand

Galyanivadhanakarun Hospital (Thai: โรงพยาบาลกัลยาณิวัฒนาการุณย์) is a university teaching hospital, affiliated to the Faculty of Medicine of Princess of Naradhiwas University, located in Mueang Narathiwat District, Narathiwat Province. It is located close to the new Provincial Government Office of Narathiwat Province.

== History ==
Construction of the hospital began in 2009 and was initially named Hospital of the Faculty of Medicine, Princess of Naradhiwas University. Its purpose was to provide a medical training site for clinical year students and become a center for medical research in the Far South of Thailand and nearby ASEAN countries such as Malaysia and Indonesia. The hospital was opened on 15 December 2014 with 22 outpatient beds. It was renamed to 'Galyanivadhanakarun Hospital' on 15 March 2015 by royal decree. The hospital plans to expand to 150 beds in the future.

== See also ==
- Healthcare in Thailand
- Hospitals in Thailand
- List of hospitals in Thailand
