= List of hospitals in Thailand =

This is a comprehensive list of hospitals in Thailand. The list is sorted with Bangkok at the top, and then in the alphabetical order of the provinces.

== Public Hospitals ==
=== Ministry of Public Health ===
==== Office of the Permanent Secretary ====
As of 2025, there were a total of 905 hospitals under the management of the Office of Permanent Secretary, separated into 35 regional, 96 general and 774 community hospitals. Bed count consists of beds that are available for inpatient admission only and does not include beds for temporary use, such as stretchers, beds in the emergency department, ICU, observation wards etc.

===== Regional Hospitals (Category A) =====
These are the largest hospitals operated by the MOPH, located at major provincial cities. Almost all of these hospitals are also teaching hospitals.

Name	Province	District	Beds (as of 2024)
Buriram Hospital	Buriram	Mueang	927
Buddhasothorn Hospital	Chachoengsao	Mueang	652
Chaiyaphum Hospital	Chaiyaphum	Mueang	793
Prapokklao Hospital	Chanthaburi	Mueang	747
Nakornping Hospital	Chiang Mai	Mae Rim	750
Chiangrai Prachanukroh Hospital	Chiang Rai	Mueang	798
Chonburi Hospital	Chonburi	Mueang	866
Khon Kaen Hospital	Khon Kaen	Mueang	1238
Lampang Hospital	Lampang	Mueang	745
Nakhon Pathom Hospital	Nakhon Pathom	Mueang	860
Maharat Nakhon Ratchasima Hospital	Nakhon Ratchasima	Mueang	1478
Sawanpracharak Hospital	Nakhon Sawan	Mueang	749
Maharaj Nakhon Si Thammarat Hospital	Nakhon Si Thammarat	Mueang	866
Phra Nang Klao Hospital	Nonthaburi	Mueang	657
Buddhachinaraj Phitsanulok Hospital	Phitsanulok	Mueang	952
Phra Nakhon Si Ayutthaya Hospital	Phra Nakhon Si Ayutthaya	Mueang	560
Vachira Phuket Hospital	Phuket	Mueang	550
Chaophraya Abhaibhubejhr Hospital	Prachinburi	Mueang	504
Ratchaburi Hospital	Ratchaburi	Mueang	855
Rayong Hospital	Rayong	Mueang	679
Roi Et Hospital	Roi Et	Mueang	881
Sakon Nakhon Hospital	Sakon Nakhon	Mueang	907
Samut Prakan Hospital	Samut Prakan	Mueang	594
Samut Sakhon Hospital	Samut Sakhon	Mueang	693
Saraburi Hospital	Saraburi	Mueang	700
Sisaket Hospital	Sisaket	Mueang	853
Hatyai Hospital	Songkhla	Hat Yai	797
Chao Phraya Yommarat Hospital	Suphan Buri	Mueang	738
Surat Thani Hospital	Surat Thani	Mueang	885
Surin Hospital	Surin	Mueang	914
Trang Hospital	Trang	Mueang	559
Sunpasitthiprasong Hospital	Ubon Ratchathani	Mueang	1188
Udon Thani Hospital	Udon Thani	Mueang	1143
Uttaradit Hospital	Uttaradit	Mueang	655
Yala Hospital	Yala	Mueang	553

===== General Hospitals (Category S and M1) =====
These are slightly smaller hospitals compared to regional hospitals, located in smaller provincial towns. Some hospitals are also teaching hospitals.

Name	Province	District	Beds (as of 2024)
Amnat Charoen Hospital	Amnat Charoen	Mueang	444
Ang Thong Hospital	Ang Thong	Mueang	324
Bueng Kan Hospital	Bueng Kan	Mueang	272
Nang Rong Hospital	Buriram	Nang Rong	459
Chai Nat Narenthorn Hospital	Chai Nat	Mueang	367
Phu Khiao Chaloem Phra Kiat Hospital	Chaiyaphum	Phu Khiao	324
Chom Thong Hospital	Chiang Mai	Chom Thong	242
Fang Hospital	Chiang Mai	Fang	232
San Pa Tong Hospital	Chiang Mai	San Pa Tong	196
San Sai Hospital	Chiang Mai	San Sai	234
Mae Sai Hospital	Chiang Rai	Mae Sai	156
Pattaya Bhattamakhun Hospital	Chonburi	Bang Lamung	408
Phanat Nikhom Hospital	Chonburi	Phanat Nikhom	220
Chumphon Khet Udomsak Hospital	Chumphon	Mueang	522
Kalasin Hospital	Kalasin	Mueang	570
Kamphaeng Phet Hospital	Kamphaeng Phet	Mueang	492
Makarak Hospital	Kanchanaburi	Tha Maka	280
Phaholpolpayuhasena Hospital	Kanchanaburi	Mueang	597
Chum Phae Hospital	Khon Kaen	Chum Phae	360
Sirindhorn Hospital	Khon Kaen	Mueang	170
Krabi Hospital	Krabi	Mueang	447
Lamphun Hospital	Lamphun	Mueang	411
Loei Hospital	Loei	Mueang	558
Ban Mi Hospital	Lopburi	Ban Mi	258
King Narai Hospital	Lopburi	Mueang	550
Srisangwan Hospital	Mae Hong Son	Mueang	154
Maha Sarakham Hospital	Maha Sarakham	Mueang	538
Mukdahan Hospital	Mukdahan	Mueang	485
Nakhon Nayok Hospital	Nakhon Nayok	Mueang	314
Nakhon Phanom Hospital	Nakhon Phanom	Mueang	392
Pak Chong Nana Hospital	Nakhon Ratchasima	Pak Chong	303
Phimai Hospital	Nakhon Ratchasima	Phimai	189
Debaratana Nakhon Ratchasima Hospital	Nakhon Ratchasima	Mueang	276
Sichon Hospital	Nakhon Si Thammarat	Sichon	306
Tha Sala Hospital	Nakhon Si Thammarat	Tha Sala	300
Thung Song Hospital	Nakhon Si Thammarat	Thung Song	330
Nan Hospital	Nan	Mueang	557
Naradhiwas Rajanagarindra Hospital	Narathiwat	Mueang	413
Su-ngai Kolok Hospital	Narathiwat	Su-ngai Kolok	212
Nong Bua Lamphu Hospital	Nong Bua Lamphu	Mueang	353
Nong Khai Hospital	Nong Khai	Mueang	420
Tha Bo Crown Prince Hospital	Nong Khai	Tha Bo	266
Pathum Thani Hospital	Pathum Thani	Mueang	456
Pattani Hospital	Pattani	Mueang	504
Phang Nga Hospital	Phang Nga	Mueang	215
Takua Pa Hospital	Phang Nga	Takua Pa	209
Phatthalung Hospital	Phatthalung	Mueang	567
Chiang Kham Hospital	Phayao	Chiang Kham	231
Phayao Hospital	Phayao	Mueang	400
Lom Sak Hospital	Phetchabun	Lom Sak	235
Phetchabun Hospital	Phetchabun	Mueang	510
Wichian Buri Hospital	Phetchabun	Wichian Buri	243
Phrachomklao Hospital	Phetchaburi	Mueang	463
Phichit Hospital	Phichit	Mueang	400
Phrae Hospital	Phrae	Mueang	568
Sena Hospital	Phra Nakhon Si Ayutthaya	Sena	208
Kabin Buri Hospital	Prachinburi	Kabin Buri	256
Bang Saphan Hospital	Prachuap Khiri Khan	Bang Saphan	156
Hua Hin Hospital	Prachuap Khiri Khan	Hua Hin	395
Prachuap Khiri Khan Hospital	Prachuap Khiri Khan	Mueang	278
Ranong Hospital	Ranong	Mueang	300
Ban Pong Hospital	Ratchaburi	Ban Pong	353
Damnoen Saduak Hospital	Ratchaburi	Damnoen Saduak	272
Photharam Hospital	Ratchaburi	Photharam	340
HRH Princess Sirindhorn Memorial Hospital Rayong (Map Taphut)	Rayong	Mueang	176
Klaeng Hospital	Rayong	Klaeng	200
Aranyaprathet Hospital	Sa Kaeo	Aranyaprathet	260
Sa Kaeo Crown Prince Hospital	Sa Kaeo	Mueang	466
Sawang Daen Din Crown Prince Hospital	Sakon Nakhon	Sawang Daen Din	276
Wanon Niwat Hospital	Sakon Nakhon	Wanon Niwat	264
Bang Phli Hospital	Samut Prakan	Bang Phli	286
Krathum Baen Hospital	Samut Sakhon	Krathum Baen	300
Somdej Phra Phutthaloetla Hospital	Samut Songkhram	Mueang	282
Phra Phutthabat Hospital	Saraburi	Phra Phutthabat	315
Satun Hospital	Satun	Mueang	300
In Buri Hospital	Sing Buri	In Buri	150
Sing Buri Hospital	Sing Buri	Mueang	282
Kantharalak Hospital	Sisaket	Kantharalak	283
Songkhla Hospital	Songkhla	Mueang	508
Srisangwon Sukhothai Hospital	Sukhothai	Si Samrong	307
Sukhothai Hospital	Sukhothai	Mueang	320
Somdejphrasangkharach XVII Hospital	Suphan Buri	Song Phi Nong	262
Ko Samui Hospital	Surat Thani	Ko Samui	160
Prasat Hospital	Surin	Prasat	265
Sikhoraphum Hospital	Surin	Sikhoraphum	227
Mae Sot Hospital	Tak	Mae Sot	420
Somdejphrajaotaksin Maharaj Hospital	Tak	Mueang	329
Trat Hospital	Trat	Mueang	395
Det Udom Crown Prince Hospital	Ubon Ratchathani	Det Udom	363
The 50th Anniversary Mahavajiralongkorn Hospital	Ubon Ratchathani	Mueang	258
Trakan Phuet Phon Hospital	Ubon Ratchathani	Trakan Phuet Phon	176
Warin Chamrap Hospital	Ubon Ratchathani	Warin Chamrap	264
Kumphawapi Hospital	Udon Thani	Kumphawapi	280
Uthai Thani Hospital	Uthai Thani	Mueang	365
Betong Hospital	Yala	Betong	170
Yasothon Hospital	Yasothon	Mueang	485

===== Community Hospitals (Category M2, F1, F2 and F3) =====
These are the smallest hospitals, serving single districts. Some hospitals act as teaching hospitals. Some hospitals do not have inpatient departments and operate with only outpatient and emergency departments. Bed counts in these hospitals are noted as '0'.

Name	Province	District	Beds (as of 2024)
Chanuman Hospital	Amnat Charoen	Chanuman	30
Hua Taphan Hospital	Amnat Charoen	Hua Taphan	60
Lue Amnat Hospital	Amnat Charoen	Lue Amnat	30
Pathum Ratchawongsa Hospital	Amnat Charoen	Pathum Ratchawongsa	50
Phana Hospital	Amnat Charoen	Phana	30
Senangkhanikhom Hospital	Amnat Charoen	Senangkhanikhom	30
Chaiyo Hospital	Ang Thong	Chaiyo	52
Pa Mok Hospital	Ang Thong	Pa Mok	54
Pho Thong Hospital	Ang Thong	Pho Thong	60
Sam Ko Hospital	Ang Thong	Sam Ko	36
Sawaeng Ha Hospital	Ang Thong	Sawaeng Ha	48
Wiset Chai Chan Hospital	Ang Thong	Wiset Chai Chan	97
Bueng Khong Long Hospital	Bueng Kan	Bueng Khong Long	45
Bung Khla Hospital	Bueng Kan	Bung Khla	32
Pak Khat Hospital	Bueng Kan	Pak Khat	41
Phon Charoen Hospital	Bueng Kan	Phon Charoen	37
Seka Hospital	Bueng Kan	Seka	125
Si Wilai Hospital	Bueng Kan	Si Wilai	38
So Phisai Hospital	Bueng Kan	So Phisai	73
Ban Dan Hospital	Buriram	Ban Dan	63
Ban Kruat Hospital	Buriram	Ban Kruat	63
Ban Mai Chaiyaphot Hospital	Buriram	Ban Mai Chaiyaphot	30
Chaloem Phrakiat Hospital	Buriram	Chaloem Phrakiat	38
Chamni Hospital	Buriram	Chamni	40
Huai Rat Hospital	Buriram	Huai Rat	44
Khaen Dong Hospital	Buriram	Khaen Dong	31
Khu Mueang Hospital	Buriram	Khu Mueang	90
Krasang Hospital	Buriram	Krasang	68
Lahan Sai Hospital	Buriram	Lahan Sai	123
Lam Plai Mat Hospital	Buriram	Lam Plai Mat	152
Na Pho Hospital	Buriram	Na Pho	35
Non Din Daeng Hospital	Buriram	Non Din Daeng	36
Non Suwan Hospital	Buriram	Non Suwan	30
Nong Hong Hospital	Buriram	Nong Hong	40
Nong Ki Hospital	Buriram	Nong Ki	66
Pakham Hospital	Buriram	Pakham	44
Phlapphla Chai Hospital	Buriram	Phlapphla Chai	46
Phutthaisong Hospital	Buriram	Phutthaisong	67
Prakhon Chai Hospital	Buriram	Prakhon Chai	170
Satuek Hospital	Buriram	Satuek	135
Ban Pho Hospital	Chachoengsao	Ban Pho	52
Bang Khla Hospital	Chachoengsao	Bang Khla	52
Bang Nam Priao Hospital	Chachoengsao	Bang Nam Priao	64
Bang Pakong Hospital	Chachoengsao	Bang Pakong	90
Khlong Khuean Hospital	Chachoengsao	Khlong Khuean	32
Phanom Sarakham Hospital	Chachoengsao	Phanom Sarakham	163
Plaeng Yao Hospital	Chachoengsao	Plaeng Yao	73
Ratchasan Hospital	Chachoengsao	Ratchasan	13
Sanam Chai Khet Hospital	Chachoengsao	Sanam Chai Khet	150
Tha Takiap Hospital	Chachoengsao	Tha Takiap	45
Han Kha Hospital	Chai Nat	Han Kha	30
Manorom Hospital	Chai Nat	Manorom	30
Noen Kham Hospital	Chai Nat	Noen Kham	0
Nong Mamong Hospital	Chai Nat	Nong Mamong	10
Sankhaburi Hospital	Chai Nat	Sankhaburi	60
Sapphaya Hospital	Chai Nat	Sapphaya	30
Wat Sing Hospital	Chai Nat	Wat Sing	30
Bamnet Narong Hospital	Chaiyaphum	Bamnet Narong	64
Ban Khwao Hospital	Chaiyaphum	Ban Khwao	36
Ban Thaen Hospital	Chaiyaphum	Ban Thaen	30
Chatturat Hospital	Chaiyaphum	Chatturat	90
Kaeng Khro Hospital	Chaiyaphum	Kaeng Khro	120
Kaset Sombun Hospital	Chaiyaphum	Kaset Sombun	67
Khon San Hospital	Chaiyaphum	Khon San	62
Khon Sawan Hospital	Chaiyaphum	Khon Sawan	49
Noen Sa-nga Hospital	Chaiyaphum	Noen Sa-nga	40
Nong Bua Daeng Hospital	Chaiyaphum	Nong Bua Daeng	120
Nong Bua Rawe Hospital	Chaiyaphum	Nong Bua Rawe	40
Phakdi Chumphon Hospital	Chaiyaphum	Phakdi Chumphon	44
Sap Yai Hospital	Chaiyaphum	Sap Yai	30
Thep Sathit Hospital	Chaiyaphum	Thep Sathit	38
Kaeng Hang Maeo Hospital	Chanthaburi	Kaeng Hang Maeo	34
Khao Khitchakut Hospital	Chanthaburi	Khao Khitchakut	40
Khao Sukim Hospital	Chanthaburi	Khao Sukim	30
Khlung Hospital	Chanthaburi	Khlung	39
Laem Sing Hospital	Chanthaburi	Laem Sing	34
Makham Hospital	Chanthaburi	Makham	42
Na Yai Am Hospital	Chanthaburi	Na Yai Am	38
Pong Nam Ron Hospital	Chanthaburi	Pong Nam Ron	69
Soi Dao Hospital	Chanthaburi	Soi Dao	62
Song Phi Nong Hospital	Chanthaburi	Song Phi Nong	32
Tha Mai Hospital	Chanthaburi	Tha Mai	33
Chai Prakan Hospital	Chiang Mai	Chai Prakan	45
Chiang Dao Hospital	Chiang Mai	Chiang Dao	95
Doi Lo Hospital	Chiang Mai	Doi Lo	31
Doi Saket Hospital	Chiang Mai	Doi Saket	60
Doi Tao Hospital	Chiang Mai	Doi Tao	30
Hang Dong Hospital	Chiang Mai	Hang Dong	90
Hot Hospital	Chiang Mai	Hot	79
Mae Ai Hospital	Chiang Mai	Mae Ai	82
Debaratana Vejjanukula Hospital	Chiang Mai	Mae Chaem	60
Mae On Hospital	Chiang Mai	Mae On	30
Mae Taeng Hospital	Chiang Mai	Mae Taeng	60
Mae Tuen Hospital	Chiang Mai	Om Koi	19
Mae Wang Hospital	Chiang Mai	Mae Wang	37
Om Koi Hospital	Chiang Mai	Om Koi	64
Phrao Hospital	Chiang Mai	Phrao	60
Samoeng Hospital	Chiang Mai	Samoeng	37
San Kamphaeng Hospital	Chiang Mai	San Kamphaeng	50
Saraphi Hospital	Chiang Mai	Saraphi	71
Wat Chan Chaloem Phrakiat Hospital	Chiang Mai	Galyani Vadhana	25
Wiang Haeng Hospital	Chiang Mai	Wiang Haeng	30
Chiang Khong Crown Prince Hospital	Chiang Rai	Chiang Khong	72
Chiang Saen Hospital	Chiang Rai	Chiang Saen	58
Doi Luang Hospital	Chiang Rai	Doi Luang	0
Khun Tan Hospital	Chiang Rai	Khun Tan	34
Mae Chan Hospital	Chiang Rai	Mae Chan	152
Mae Fa Luang Hospital	Chiang Rai	Mae Fa Luang	30
Mae Lao Hospital	Chiang Rai	Mae Lao	30
Mae Suai Hospital	Chiang Rai	Mae Suai	60
Pa Daed Hospital	Chiang Rai	Pa Daed	30
Phan Hospital	Chiang Rai	Phan	175
Phaya Mengrai Hospital	Chiang Rai	Phaya Mengrai	60
Somdet Phra Yanasangwon Hospital	Chiang Rai	Wiang Chai	30
Thoeng Hospital	Chiang Rai	Thoeng	90
Wiang Chiang Rung Hospital	Chiang Rai	Wiang Chiang Rung	30
Wiang Kaen Hospital	Chiang Rai	Wiang Kaen	34
Wiang Pa Pao Hospital	Chiang Rai	Wiang Pa Pao	81
Ban Bueng Hospital	Chonburi	Ban Bueng	170
Bo Thong Hospital	Chonburi	Bo Thong	70
Ko Chan Hospital	Chonburi	Ko Chan	30
Ko Sichang Hospital	Chonburi	Ko Sichang	15
Laem Chabang Hospital	Chonburi	Si Racha	187
Nong Yai Hospital	Chonburi	Nong Yai	35
Phan Thong Hospital	Chonburi	Phan Thong	90
Sattahip K.M. 10 Hospital	Chonburi	Sattahip	66
Wat Yansangwararam Hospital	Chonburi	Bang Lamung	31
Lamae Hospital	Chumphon	Lamae	30
Lang Suan Hospital	Chumphon	Lang Suan	182
Map Ammarit Hospital	Chumphon	Map Ammarit	30
Pak Nam Chumphon Hospital	Chumphon	Mueang	10
Pak Nam Lang Suan Hospital	Chumphon	Lang Suan	12
Pathio Hospital	Chumphon	Pathio	47
Phato Hospital	Chumphon	Phato	30
Sawi Hospital	Chumphon	Sawi	66
Tha Sae Hospital	Chumphon	Tha Sae	75
Thung Tako Hospital	Chumphon	Thung Tako	30
Don Chan Hospital	Kalasin	Don Chan	14
Huai Mek Hospital	Kalasin	Huai Mek	58
Huai Phueng Hospital	Kalasin	Huai Phueng	34
Kamalasai Hospital	Kalasin	Kamalasai	143
Kham Muang Hospital	Kalasin	Kham Muang	81
Khao Wong Hospital	Kalasin	Khao Wong	88
Khong Chai Hospital	Kalasin	Khong Chai	30
Kuchinarai Crown Prince Hospital	Kalasin	Kuchinarai	177
Na Khu Hospital	Kalasin	Na Khu	41
Na Mon Hospital	Kalasin	Na Mon	37
Nong Kung Si Hospital	Kalasin	Nong Kung Si	80
Rong Kham Hospital	Kalasin	Rong Kham	30
Sahatsakhan Hospital	Kalasin	Sahatsakhan	40
Sam Chai Hospital	Kalasin	Sam Chai	30
Somdet Hospital	Kalasin	Somdet	114
Tha Khantho Hospital	Kalasin	Tha Khantho	60
Yang Talat Hospital	Kalasin	Yang Talat	162
Bueng Samakkhi Hospital	Kamphaeng Phet	Bueng Samakkhi	30
Khanu Woralaksaburi Hospital	Kamphaeng Phet	Khanu Woralaksaburi	90
Khlong Khlung Hospital	Kamphaeng Phet	Khlong Khlung	90
Khlong Lan Hospital	Kamphaeng Phet	Khlong Lan	60
Kosamphi Nakhon Hospital	Kamphaeng Phet	Kosamphi Nakhon	10
Lan Krabue Hospital	Kamphaeng Phet	Lan Krabue	30
Pang Sila Thong Hospital	Kamphaeng Phet	Pang Sila Thong	30
Phran Kratai Hospital	Kamphaeng Phet	Phran Kratai	66
Sai Ngam Hospital	Kamphaeng Phet	Sai Ngam	30
Sai Thong Watthana Hospital	Kamphaeng Phet	Sai Thong Watthana	30
Thung Pho Thale Hospital	Kamphaeng Phet	Thung Pho Thale	10
Bo Phloi Hospital	Kanchanaburi	Bo Phloi	60
Chao Khun Phaibun Phanom Thuan Hospital	Kanchanaburi	Phanom Thuan	59
Dan Makham Tia Hospital	Kanchanaburi	Dan Makham Tia	56
Huai Krachao Chaloem Phrakiat Hospital	Kanchanaburi	Huai Krachao	30
Lao Khwan Hospital	Kanchanaburi	Lao Khwan	54
Nong Prue Hospital	Kanchanaburi	Nong Prue	30
Phayaban Sathan Phra Barami Hospital	Kanchanaburi	Nong Prue	30
Sai Yok Hospital	Kanchanaburi	Sai Yok	58
Sangkhla Buri Hospital	Kanchanaburi	Sangkhla Buri	61
Somdejprasangkharach XIX Hospital	Kanchanaburi	Tha Muang	141
Somdet Phra Piya Maharat Rommaniyakhet Hospital	Kanchanaburi	Sai Yok	30
Suk Siri Si Sawat Hospital	Kanchanaburi	Si Sawat	10
Tha Kradan Hospital	Kanchanaburi	Si Sawat	32
Thong Pha Phum Hospital	Kanchanaburi	Thong Pha Phum	95
Ban Fang Hospital	Khon Kaen	Ban Fang	30
Ban Phai Hospital	Khon Kaen	Ban Phai	142
Chonnabot Hospital	Khon Kaen	Chonnabot	35
Khao Suan Kwang Hospital	Khon Kaen	Khao Suan Kwang	45
Khok Pho Chai Hospital	Khon Kaen	Khok Pho Chai	0
Kranuan Crown Prince Hospital	Khon Kaen	Kranuan	150
Mancha Khiri Hospital	Khon Kaen	Mancha Khiri	65
Nam Phong Hospital	Khon Kaen	Nam Phong	120
Non Sila Hospital	Khon Kaen	Non Sila	30
Nong Na Kham Hospital	Khon Kaen	Nong Na Kham	0
Nong Ruea Hospital	Khon Kaen	Nong Ruea	90
Nong Song Hong Hospital	Khon Kaen	Nong Song Hong	69
Phon Hospital	Khon Kaen	Phon	117
Phra Yuen Hospital	Khon Kaen	Phra Yuen	34
Phu Pha Man Hospital	Khon Kaen	Phu Pha Man	30
Phu Wiang Hospital	Khon Kaen	Phu Wiang	60
Poei Noi Hospital	Khon Kaen	Poei Noi	30
Sam Sung Hospital	Khon Kaen	Sam Sung	30
Si Chomphu Hospital	Khon Kaen	Si Chomphu	78
Ubolratana Hospital	Khon Kaen	Ubolratana	60
Waeng Noi Hospital	Khon Kaen	Waeng Noi	34
Waeng Yai Hospital	Khon Kaen	Waeng Yai	36
Wiang Kao Hospital	Khon Kaen	Wiang Kao	0
Ao Luek Hospital	Krabi	Ao Luek	85
Khao Phanom Hospital	Krabi	Khao Phanom	52
Khlong Thom Hospital	Krabi	Khlong Thom	71
Ko Lanta Hospital	Krabi	Ko Lanta	40
Ko Phi Phi Hospital	Krabi	Mueang	7
Lam Thap Hospital	Krabi	Lam Thap	36
Nuea Khlong Hospital	Krabi	Nuea Khlong	64
Plai Phraya Hospital	Krabi	Plai Phraya	53
Chae Hom Hospital	Lampang	Chae Hom	32
Hang Chat Hospital	Lampang	Hang Chat	30
Ko Kha Hospital	Lampang	Ko Kha	152
Mae Mo Hospital	Lampang	Mae Mo	30
Mae Phrik Hospital	Lampang	Mae Phrik	16
Mae Tha Hospital	Lampang	Mae Tha	33
Mueang Pan Hospital	Lampang	Mueang Pan	30
Ngao Hospital	Lampang	Ngao	40
Soem Ngam Hospital	Lampang	Soem Ngam	30
Sop Prap Hospital	Lampang	Sop Prap	30
Thoen Hospital	Lampang	Thoen	87
Wang Nuea Hospital	Lampang	Wang Nuea	30
Ban Hong Hospital	Lamphun	Ban Hong	30
Ban Thi Hospital	Lamphun	Ban Thi	30
Li Hospital	Lamphun	Li	74
Mae Tha Hospital	Lamphun	Mae Tha	30
Pa Sang Hospital	Lamphun	Pa Sang	75
Thung Hua Chang Hospital	Lamphun	Thung Hua Chang	30
Wiang Nong Long Hospital	Lamphun	Wiang Nong Long	16
Chiang Khan Hospital	Loei	Chiang Khan	59
Dan Sai Crown Prince Hospital	Loei	Dan Sai	60
Erawan Hospital	Loei	Erawan	32
Na Duang Hospital	Loei	Na Duang	30
Na Haeo Hospital	Loei	Na Haeo	20
Nong Hin Hospital	Loei	Nong Hin	30
Pak Chom Hospital	Loei	Pak Chom	34
Pha Khao Hospital	Loei	Pha Khao	40
Phu Kradueng Hospital	Loei	Phu Kradueng	32
Phu Luang Hospital	Loei	Phu Luang	40
Phu Ruea Hospital	Loei	Phu Ruea	30
Tha Li Hospital	Loei	Tha Li	35
Wang Saphung Hospital	Loei	Wang Saphung	120
Chai Badan Hospital	Lopburi	Chai Badan	140
Khok Charoen Hospital	Lopburi	Khok Charoen	30
Khok Samrong Hospital	Lopburi	Khok Samrong	120
Lam Sonthi Hospital	Lopburi	Lam Sonthi	37
Nong Muang Hospital	Lopburi	Nong Muang	35
Phatthana Nikhom Hospital	Lopburi	Phatthana Nikhom	66
Sa Bot Hospital	Lopburi	Sa Bot	30
Tha Luang Hospital	Lopburi	Tha Luang	38
Tha Wung Hospital	Lopburi	Tha Wung	52
Khun Yuam Hospital	Mae Hong Son	Khun Yuam	35
Mae La Noi Hospital	Mae Hong Son	Mae La Noi	34
Mae Sariang Hospital	Mae Hong Son	Mae Sariang	115
Pai Hospital	Mae Hong Son	Pai	58
Pang Mapha Hospital	Mae Hong Son	Pang Mapha	29
Sop Moei Hospital	Mae Hong Son	Sop Moei	30
Borabue Hospital	Maha Sarakham	Borabue	165
Chiang Yuen Hospital	Maha Sarakham	Chiang Yuen	60
Chuen Chom Hospital	Maha Sarakham	Chuen Chom	30
Kae Dam Hospital	Maha Sarakham	Kae Dam	30
Kantharawichai Hospital	Maha Sarakham	Kantharawichai	60
Kosum Phisai Hospital	Maha Sarakham	Kosum Phisai	120
Kut Rang Hospital	Maha Sarakham	Kut Rang	30
Na Chueak Hospital	Maha Sarakham	Na Chueak	68
Na Dun Hospital	Maha Sarakham	Na Dun	30
Phayakkhaphum Phisai Hospital	Maha Sarakham	Phayakkhaphum Phisai	111
Wapi Pathum Hospital	Maha Sarakham	Wapi Pathum	120
Yang Si Surat Hospital	Maha Sarakham	Yang Si Surat	30
Don Tan Hospital	Mukdahan	Don Tan	30
Dong Luang Hospital	Mukdahan	Dong Luang	30
Khamcha-i Hospital	Mukdahan	Khamcha-i	30
Nikhom Kham Soi Hospital	Mukdahan	Nikhom Kham Soi	30
Nong Sung Hospital	Mukdahan	Nong Sung	30
Wan Yai Hospital	Mukdahan	Wan Yai	30
Ban Na Hospital	Nakhon Nayok	Ban Na	70
Ongkharak Hospital	Nakhon Nayok	Ongkharak	31
Pak Phli Hospital	Nakhon Nayok	Pak Phli	10
Bang Len Hospital	Nakhon Pathom	Bang Len	79
Don Tum Hospital	Nakhon Pathom	Don Tum	38
Huai Phlu Hospital	Nakhon Pathom	Nakhon Chai Si	60
Kamphaeng Saen Hospital	Nakhon Pathom	Kamphaeng Saen	120
Luang Pho Poen Hospital	Nakhon Pathom	Nakhon Chai Si	32
Nakhon Chai Si Hospital	Nakhon Pathom	Nakhon Chai Si	60
Phutthamonthon Hospital	Nakhon Pathom	Phutthamonthon	34
Sam Phran Hospital	Nakhon Pathom	Sam Phran	136
Ban Phaeng Hospital	Nakhon Phanom	Ban Phaeng	43
Na Kae Hospital	Nakhon Phanom	Na Kae	61
Na Thom Hospital	Nakhon Phanom	Na Thom	36
Na Wa Hospital	Nakhon Phanom	Na Wa	48
Phon Sawan Hospital	Nakhon Phanom	Phon Sawan	50
Pla Pak Hospital	Nakhon Phanom	Pla Pak	30
Renu Nakhon Hospital	Nakhon Phanom	Renu Nakhon	30
Si Songkhram Hospital	Nakhon Phanom	Si Songkhram	90
Tha Uthen Hospital	Nakhon Phanom	Tha Uthen	40
That Phanom Crown Prince Hospital	Nakhon Phanom	That Phanom	234
Wang Yang Hospital	Nakhon Phanom	Wang Yang	20
Ban Lueam Hospital	Nakhon Ratchasima	Ban Lueam	35
Bua Lai Hospital	Nakhon Ratchasima	Bua Lai	10
Bua Yai Hospital	Nakhon Ratchasima	Bua Yai	200
Chakkarat Hospital	Nakhon Ratchasima	Chakkarat	90
Chaloem Phra Kiat Hospital	Nakhon Ratchasima	Chaloem Phra Kiat	36
Chok Chai Hospital	Nakhon Ratchasima	Chok Chai	91
Chum Phuang Hospital	Nakhon Ratchasima	Chum Phuang	70
Dan Khun Thot Hospital	Nakhon Ratchasima	Dan Khun Thot	120
Huai Thalaeng Hospital	Nakhon Ratchasima	Huai Thalaeng	60
Kaeng Sanam Nang Hospital	Nakhon Ratchasima	Kaeng Sanam Nang	35
Kham Sakae Saeng Hospital	Nakhon Ratchasima	Kham Sakae Saeng	60
Kham Thale So Hospital	Nakhon Ratchasima	Kham Thale So	36
Khon Buri Hospital	Nakhon Ratchasima	Khon Buri	156
Khong Hospital	Nakhon Ratchasima	Khong	60
Lam Thamen Chai Hospital	Nakhon Ratchasima	Lam Thamen Chai	30
Luang Pho Khun Parisuddho Hospital	Nakhon Ratchasima	Dan Khun Thot	114
HRH The Princess Mother Centenary Hospital Mueang Yang	Nakhon Ratchasima	Mueang Yang	30
Makutkiriwan Hospital	Nakhon Ratchasima	Pak Chong	13
Non Daeng Hospital	Nakhon Ratchasima	Non Daeng	30
Non Sung Hospital	Nakhon Ratchasima	Non Sung	86
Non Thai Hospital	Nakhon Ratchasima	Non Thai	75
Nong Bun Mak Hospital	Nakhon Ratchasima	Nong Bun Mak	63
Pak Thong Chai Hospital	Nakhon Ratchasima	Pak Thong Chai	115
Phra Thong Kham Chaloem Phrakiat Hospital	Nakhon Ratchasima	Phra Thong Kham	30
Prathai Hospital	Nakhon Ratchasima	Prathai	72
Sida Hospital	Nakhon Ratchasima	Sida	24
Sikhio Hospital	Nakhon Ratchasima	Sikhio	145
Soeng Sang Hospital	Nakhon Ratchasima	Soeng Sang	60
Sung Noen Hospital	Nakhon Ratchasima	Sung Noen	117
Thepharak Hospital	Nakhon Ratchasima	Thepharak	30
Wang Nam Khiao Hospital	Nakhon Ratchasima	Wang Nam Khiao	51
Banphot Phisai Hospital	Nakhon Sawan	Banphot Phisai	90
Chum Saeng Hospital	Nakhon Sawan	Chum Saeng	60
Chum Ta Bong Hospital	Nakhon Sawan	Chum Ta Bong	5
Kao Liao Hospital	Nakhon Sawan	Kao Liao	34
Krok Phra Hospital	Nakhon Sawan	Krok Phra	30
Lat Yao Hospital	Nakhon Sawan	Lat Yao	90
Mae Poen Hospital	Nakhon Sawan	Mae Poen	0
Mae Wong Hospital	Nakhon Sawan	Mae Wong	30
Nong Bua Hospital	Nakhon Sawan	Nong Bua	63
Phaisali Hospital	Nakhon Sawan	Phaisali	63
Phayuha Khiri Hospital	Nakhon Sawan	Phayuha Khiri	42
Tak Fa Hospital	Nakhon Sawan	Tak Fa	30
Takhli Hospital	Nakhon Sawan	Takhli	90
Tha Tako Hospital	Nakhon Sawan	Tha Tako	60
Bang Khan Hospital	Nakhon Si Thammarat	Bang Khan	38
Chaloem Phra Kiat Hospital	Nakhon Si Thammarat	Chaloem Phra Kiat	39
Cha-uat Hospital	Nakhon Si Thammarat	Cha-uat	90
Chawang Crown Prince Hospital	Nakhon Si Thammarat	Chawang	143
Chian Yai Hospital	Nakhon Si Thammarat	Chian Yai	54
Chulabhorn Hospital	Nakhon Si Thammarat	Chulabhorn	32
Hua Sai Hospital	Nakhon Si Thammarat	Hua Sai	60
Khanom Hospital	Nakhon Si Thammarat	Khanom	66
Lan Saka Hospital	Nakhon Si Thammarat	Lan Saka	52
Na Bon Hospital	Nakhon Si Thammarat	Na Bon	30
Nopphitam Hospital	Nakhon Si Thammarat	Nopphitam	3
Pak Phanang Hospital	Nakhon Si Thammarat	Pak Phanang	105
Phipun Hospital	Nakhon Si Thammarat	Phipun	33
Porthan Khlai Vajasit Hospital	Nakhon Si Thammarat	Chang Klang	31
Phra Phrom Hospital	Nakhon Si Thammarat	Phra Phrom	60
Phrom Khiri Hospital	Nakhon Si Thammarat	Phrom Khiri	30
Ron Phibun Hospital	Nakhon Si Thammarat	Ron Phibun	83
Tham Phannara Hospital	Nakhon Si Thammarat	Tham Phannara	26
Thung Yai Hospital	Nakhon Si Thammarat	Thung Yai	75
Ban Luang Hospital	Nan	Ban Luang	33
Bo Kluea Hospital	Nan	Bo Kluea	20
Chaloem Phrakiat Hospital	Nan	Chaloem Phrakiat	34
Chiang Klang Hospital	Nan	Chiang Klang	28
Mae Charim Hospital	Nan	Mae Charim	20
Na Muen Hospital	Nan	Na Muen	20
Na Noi Hospital	Nan	Na Noi	69
Phu Phiang Hospital	Nan	Phu Phiang	20
Pua Crown Prince Hospital	Nan	Pua	120
Santisuk Hospital	Nan	Santisuk	24
Song Khwae Hospital	Nan	Song Khwae	15
Tha Wang Pha Hospital	Nan	Tha Wang Pha	45
Thung Chang Hospital	Nan	Thung Chang	30
Wiang Sa Hospital	Nan	Wiang Sa	78
Bacho Hospital	Narathiwat	Bacho	68
Chanae Hospital	Narathiwat	Chanae	60
Cho Ai Rong Hospital	Narathiwat	Cho Ai Rong	30
Ra-ngae Hospital	Narathiwat	Ra-ngae	134
Rueso Hospital	Narathiwat	Rueso	82
Si Sakhon Hospital	Narathiwat	Si Sakhon	54
Sukhirin Hospital	Narathiwat	Sukhirin	35
Su-ngai Padi Hospital	Narathiwat	Su-ngai Padi	41
Tak Bai Hospital	Narathiwat	Tak Bai	100
Waeng Hospital	Narathiwat	Waeng	60
Yi-ngo Chaloem Phrakiat Hospital	Narathiwat	Yi-ngo	60
Na Klang Hospital	Nong Bua Lamphu	Na Klang	60
Na Wang Chaloem Phrakiat Hospital	Nong Bua Lamphu	Na Wang	30
Non Sang Hospital	Nong Bua Lamphu	Non Sang	40
Si Bun Rueang Hospital	Nong Bua Lamphu	Si Bun Rueang	90
Suwannakhuha Hospital	Nong Bua Lamphu	Suwannakhuha	40
Fao Rai Hospital	Nong Khai	Fao Rai	30
Phon Phisai Hospital	Nong Khai	Phon Phisai	129
Pho Tak Hospital	Nong Khai	Pho Tak	15
Rattanawapi Hospital	Nong Khai	Rattanawapi	30
Sa Khrai Hospital	Nong Khai	Sa Khrai	30
Sangkhom Hospital	Nong Khai	Sangkhom	30
Si Chiang Mai Hospital	Nong Khai	Si Chiang Mai	30
Bang Bua Thong Hospital	Nonthaburi	Bang Bua Thong	102
Bang Kruai Hospital	Nonthaburi	Bang Kruai	60
Nonthaburi Medical Center	Nonthaburi	Bang Kruai	30
Bang Yai Hospital	Nonthaburi	Bang Yai	104
Pak Kret Hospital	Nonthaburi	Pak Kret	87
Phimon Rat Hospital	Nonthaburi	Bang Bua Thong	30
Sai Noi Hospital	Nonthaburi	Sai Noi	60
Khlong Luang Hospital	Pathum Thani	Khlong Luang	62
Lam Luk Ka Hospital	Pathum Thani	Lam Luk Ka	46
Lat Lum Kaeo Hospital	Pathum Thani	Lat Lum Kaeo	48
Nong Suea Hospital	Pathum Thani	Nong Suea	35
Prachathipat Hospital	Pathum Thani	Thanyaburi	37
Sam Khok Hospital	Pathum Thani	Sam Khok	36
Thanyaburi Hospital	Pathum Thani	Thanyaburi	120
Kapho Hospital	Pattani	Kapho	37
Khok Pho Hospital	Pattani	Khok Pho	104
Mae Lan Hospital	Pattani	Mae Lan	34
Mai Kaen Hospital	Pattani	Mai Kaen	34
Mayo Hospital	Pattani	Mayo	42
Nong Chik Hospital	Pattani	Nong Chik	30
Panare Hospital	Pattani	Panare	30
Sai Buri Crown Prince Hospital	Pattani	Sai Buri	135
Thung Yang Daeng Hospital	Pattani	Thung Yang Daeng	30
Yarang Hospital	Pattani	Yarang	64
Yaring Hospital	Pattani	Yaring	69
Bang Sai - Takua Pa Hospital	Phang Nga	Takua Pa	0
Kapong Chaiphat Hospital	Phang Nga	Kapong	32
Khura Buri Chaiphat Hospital	Phang Nga	Khura Buri	33
Ko Yao Chaiphat Hospital	Phang Nga	Ko Yao	30
Takua Thung Hospital	Phang Nga	Takua Thung	36
Thai Mueang Chaiphat Hospital	Phang Nga	Thai Mueang	33
Thap Put Hospital	Phang Nga	Thap Put	39
Bang Kaeo Hospital	Phatthalung	Bang Kaeo	30
Khao Chai Son Hospital	Phatthalung	Khao Chai Son	30
Khuan Khanun Hospital	Phatthalung	Khuan Khanun	90
Kong Ra Hospital	Phatthalung	Kong Ra	35
Pa Bon Hospital	Phatthalung	Pa Bon	30
Pa Phayom Hospital	Phatthalung	Pa Phayom	45
Pak Phayun Hospital	Phatthalung	Pak Phayun	30
Si Banphot Hospital	Phatthalung	Si Banphot	30
Srinagarindra (Panyananthaphikkhu) Hospital	Phatthalung	Srinagarindra	30
Tamot Hospital	Phatthalung	Tamot	31
Chiang Muan Hospital	Phayao	Chiang Muan	36
Chun Hospital	Phayao	Chun	52
Dok Kham Tai Hospital	Phayao	Dok Kham Tai	60
Mae Chai Hospital	Phayao	Mae Chai	30
Phu Kamyao Hospital	Phayao	Phu Kamyao	0
Phu Sang Hospital	Phayao	Phu Sang	0
Pong Hospital	Phayao	Pong	33
Bueng Sam Phan Hospital	Phetchabun	Bueng Sam Phan	90
Chon Daen Hospital	Phetchabun	Chon Daen	60
Khao Kho Hospital	Phetchabun	Khao Kho	30
Lom Kao Crown Prince Hospital	Phetchabun	Lom Kao	100
Nam Nao Hospital	Phetchabun	Nam Nao	10
Nong Phai Hospital	Phetchabun	Nong Phai	142
Si Thep Hospital	Phetchabun	Si Thep	57
Wang Pong Hospital	Phetchabun	Wang Pong	30
Ban Laem Hospital	Phetchaburi	Ban Laem	37
Ban Lat Hospital	Phetchaburi	Ban Lat	32
Cha-am Hospital	Phetchaburi	Cha-am	90
Kaeng Krachan Hospital	Phetchaburi	Kaeng Krachan	66
Khao Yoi Hospital	Phetchaburi	Khao Yoi	33
Nong Ya Plong Hospital	Phetchaburi	Nong Ya Plong	30
Tha Yang Hospital	Phetchaburi	Tha Yang	78
Bang Mun Nak Hospital	Phichit	Bang Mun Nak	90
Bueng Na Rang Hospital	Phichit	Bueng Na Rang	24
Dong Charoen Hospital	Phichit	Dong Charoen	22
Pho Prathap Chang Hospital	Phichit	Pho Prathap Chang	30
Pho Thale Hospital	Phichit	Pho Thale	45
Sak Lek Hospital	Phichit	Sak Lek	19
Sam Ngam Hospital	Phichit	Sam Ngam	30
Taphan Hin Crown Prince Hospital	Phichit	Taphan Hin	90
Thap Khlo Hospital	Phichit	Thap Khlo	28
Wachirabarami Hospital	Phichit	Wachirabarami	30
Wang Sai Phun Hospital	Phichit	Wang Sai Phun	30
Bang Krathum Hospital	Phitsanulok	Bang Krathum	30
Bang Rakam Hospital	Phitsanulok	Bang Rakam	69
Chat Trakan Hospital	Phitsanulok	Chat Trakan	30
Nakhon Thai Crown Prince Hospital	Phitsanulok	Nakhon Thai	118
Noen Maprang Hospital	Phitsanulok	Noen Maprang	33
Phrom Phiram Hospital	Phitsanulok	Phrom Phiram	50
Wang Thong Hospital	Phitsanulok	Wang Thong	68
Wat Bot Hospital	Phitsanulok	Wat Bot	30
Den Chai Crown Prince Hospital	Phrae	Den Chai	38
Long Hospital	Phrae	Long	39
Nong Muang Khai Hospital	Phrae	Nong Muang Khai	32
Rong Kwang Hospital	Phrae	Rong Kwang	41
Song Hospital	Phrae	Song	55
Sung Men Hospital	Phrae	Sung Men	64
Wang Chin Hospital	Phrae	Wang Chin	36
Ban Phraek Hospital	Phra Nakhon Si Ayutthaya	Ban Phraek	10
Bang Ban Hospital	Phra Nakhon Si Ayutthaya	Bang Ban	26
Bang Pahan Hospital	Phra Nakhon Si Ayutthaya	Bang Pahan	35
Bang Pa-in Hospital	Phra Nakhon Si Ayutthaya	Bang Pa-in	96
Bang Sai Hospital	Phra Nakhon Si Ayutthaya	Bang Sai (1404)	39
Bang Sai Hospital	Phra Nakhon Si Ayutthaya	Bang Sai (1413)	10
Lat Bua Luang Hospital	Phra Nakhon Si Ayutthaya	Lat Bua Luang	34
Maha Rat Hospital	Phra Nakhon Si Ayutthaya	Maha Rat	22
Phachi Hospital	Phra Nakhon Si Ayutthaya	Phachi	40
Phak Hai Hospital	Phra Nakhon Si Ayutthaya	Phak Hai	31
Somdet Phra Sangkharat Wassanamahatayra Hospital	Phra Nakhon Si Ayutthaya	Nakhon Luang	45
Tha Ruea Hospital	Phra Nakhon Si Ayutthaya	Tha Ruea	32
Uthai Hospital	Phra Nakhon Si Ayutthaya	Uthai	38
Wang Noi Hospital	Phra Nakhon Si Ayutthaya	Wang Noi	68
Chalong Hospital	Phuket	Mueang	48
Patong Hospital	Phuket	Kathu	88
Thalang Hospital	Phuket	Thalang	90
Ban Sang Hospital	Prachinburi	Ban Sang	30
Na Di Hospital	Prachinburi	Na Di	60
Prachantakham Hospital	Prachinburi	Prachantakham	33
Si Maha Phot Hospital	Prachinburi	Si Maha Phot	66
Si Mahosot Hospital	Prachinburi	Si Mahosot	30
Bang Saphan Noi Hospital	Prachuap Khiri Khan	Bang Saphan Noi	30
Kui Buri Hospital	Prachuap Khiri Khan	Kui Buri	30
Pran Buri Hospital	Prachuap Khiri Khan	Pran Buri	60
Sam Roi Yot Hospital	Prachuap Khiri Khan	Sam Roi Yot	90
Thap Sakae Hospital	Prachuap Khiri Khan	Thap Sakae	60
Kapoe Hospital	Ranong	Kapoe	35
Kra Buri Hospital	Ranong	Kra Buri	30
La-un Hospital	Ranong	La-un	16
Suk Samran Hospital	Ranong	Suk Samran	10
Ban Kha Hospital	Ratchaburi	Ban Kha	30
Bang Phae Hospital	Ratchaburi	Bang Phae	48
Chet Samian Hospital	Ratchaburi	Photharam	30
Chom Bueng Crown Prince Hospital	Ratchaburi	Chom Bueng	60
Pak Tho Hospital	Ratchaburi	Pak Tho	60
Suan Phueng Hospital	Ratchaburi	Suan Phueng	60
Wat Phleng Hospital	Ratchaburi	Wat Phleng	38
Ban Chang Hospital	Rayong	Ban Chang	75
Ban Khai Hospital	Rayong	Ban Khai	48
Khao Chamao Chaloem Phrakiat Hospital	Rayong	Khao Chamao	30
Nikhom Phatthana Hospital	Rayong	Nikhom Phattana	30
Pluak Daeng Hospital	Rayong	Pluak Daeng	76
Wang Chan Hospital	Rayong	Wang Chan	43
At Samat Hospital	Roi Et	At Samat	39
Changhan Hospital	Roi Et	Changhan	35
Chaturaphak Phiman Hospital	Roi Et	Chaturaphak Phiman	65
Chiang Khwan Hospital	Roi Et	Chiang Khwan	0
Kaset Wisai Hospital	Roi Et	Kaset Wisai	165
Moei Wadi Hospital	Roi Et	Moei Wadi	30
Mueang Suang Hospital	Roi Et	Mueang Suang	33
Nong Hi Hospital	Roi Et	Nong Hi	28
Nong Phok Hospital	Roi Et	Nong Phok	30
Pathum Rat Hospital	Roi Et	Pathum Rat	36
Phanom Phrai Hospital	Roi Et	Phanom Phrai	42
Pho Chai Hospital	Roi Et	Pho Chai	30
Phon Sai Hospital	Roi Et	Phon Sai	31
Phon Thong Hospital	Roi Et	Phon Thong	213
Selaphum Hospital	Roi Et	Selaphum	112
Si Somdet Hospital	Roi Et	Si Somdet	37
Suwannaphum Hospital	Roi Et	Suwannaphum	181
Thawat Buri Hospital	Roi Et	Thawat Buri	38
Thung Khao Luang Hospital	Roi Et	Thung Khao Luang	10
Khao Chakan Hospital	Sa Kaeo	Khao Chakan	50
Khlong Hat Hospital	Sa Kaeo	Khlong Hat	38
Khok Sung Hospital	Sa Kaeo	Khok Sung	30
Ta Phraya Hospital	Sa Kaeo	Ta Phraya	53
Wang Nam Yen Hospital	Sa Kaeo	Wang Nam Yen	76
Wang Sombun Hospital	Sa Kaeo	Wang Sombun	34
Watthana Nakhon Hospital	Sa Kaeo	Watthana Nakhon	75
Akat Amnuai Hospital	Sakon Nakhon	Akat Amnuai	82
Ban Muang Hospital	Sakon Nakhon	Ban Muang	82
Charoen Sin Hospital	Sakon Nakhon	Charoen Sin	40
Kham Ta Kla Hospital	Sakon Nakhon	Kham Ta Kla	40
Khok Si Suphan Hospital	Sakon Nakhon	Khok Si Suphan	42
Kusuman Hospital	Sakon Nakhon	Kusuman	40
Kut Bak Hospital	Sakon Nakhon	Kut Bak	39
Nikhom Nam Un Hospital	Sakon Nakhon	Nikhom Nam Un	15
Phang Khon Hospital	Sakon Nakhon	Phang Khon	107
Phon Na Kaeo Hospital	Sakon Nakhon	Phon Na Kaeo	34
Phra Achan Ban Thanakaro Hospital	Sakon Nakhon	Phu Phan	40
Phra Achan Fan Acharo Hospital	Sakon Nakhon	Phanna Nikhom	90
Song Dao Hospital	Sakon Nakhon	Song Dao	38
Tao Ngoi Hospital	Sakon Nakhon	Tao Ngoi	35
Warichaphum Hospital	Sakon Nakhon	Warichaphum	43
Bang Bo Hospital	Samut Prakan	Bang Bo	191
Bang Chak Hospital	Samut Prakan	Phra Pradaeng	104
Bang Sao Thong Hospital	Samut Prakan	Bang Sao Thong	20
Phra Samut Chedi Sawatayanon Hospital	Samut Prakan	Phra Samut Chedi	52
Tha Chalom City (Samut Sakhon 3) Hospital	Samut Sakhon	Mueang	74
Wat Bang Pla (Samut Sakhon 4) Hospital	Samut Sakhon	Mueang	74
Wat Ketmadeesriwararam (Samut Sakhon 2) Hospital	Samut Sakhon	Mueang	74
Amphawa Hospital	Samut Songkhram	Amphawa	33
Napalai Hospital	Samut Songkhram	Bang Khonthi	90
Ban Mo Hospital	Saraburi	Ban Mo	30
Don Phut Hospital	Saraburi	Don Phut	15
Kaeng Khoi Hospital	Saraburi	Kaeng Khoi	68
Muak Lek Hospital	Saraburi	Muak Lek	35
Nong Don Hospital	Saraburi	Nong Don	20
Nong Khae Hospital	Saraburi	Nong Khae	65
Nong Saeng Hospital	Saraburi	Nong Saeng	15
Sao Hai Chaloem Phrakiat Hospital	Saraburi	Sao Hai	28
Wang Muang Sattatham Hospital	Saraburi	Wang Muang	33
Wihan Daeng Hospital	Saraburi	Wihan Daeng	48
Khuan Don Hospital	Satun	Khuan Don	34
Khuan Kalong Hospital	Satun	Khuan Kalong	36
La-ngu Hospital	Satun	La-ngu	136
Manang Hospital	Satun	Manang	32
Tha Phae Hospital	Satun	Tha Phae	69
Thung Wa Hospital	Satun	Thung Wa	30
Bang Rachan Hospital	Singburi	Bang Rachan	35
Khai Bang Rachan Hospital	Singburi	Khai Bang Rachan	30
Phrom Buri Hospital	Singburi	Phrom Buri	28
Tha Chang Hospital	Singburi	Tha Chang	42
Benchalak Chaloem Phrakiat Hospital	Sisaket	Benchalak	30
Bueng Bun Hospital	Sisaket	Bueng Bun	30
Huai Thap Than Hospital	Sisaket	Huai Thap Than	30
Kanthararom Hospital	Sisaket	Kanthararom	120
Khu Khan Hospital	Sisaket	Khu Khan	135
Khun Han Hospital	Sisaket	Khun Han	94
Mueang Chan Hospital	Sisaket	Mueang Chan	30
Nam Kliang Hospital	Sisaket	Nam Kliang	32
Non Khun Hospital	Sisaket	Non Khun	30
Phayu Hospital	Sisaket	Phayu	30
Pho Si Suwan Hospital	Sisaket	Pho Si Suwan	30
Phrai Bueng Hospital	Sisaket	Phrai Bueng	33
Phu Sing Hospital	Sisaket	Phu Sing	34
Prang Ku Hospital	Sisaket	Prang Ku	60
Rasi Salai Hospital	Sisaket	Rasi Salai	90
Sila Lat Hospital	Sisaket	Sila Lat	30
Si Rattana Hospital	Sisaket	Si Rattana	70
Uthumphon Phisai Hospital	Sisaket	Uthumphon Phisai	130
Wang Hin Hospital	Sisaket	Wang Hin	34
Yang Chum Noi Hospital	Sisaket	Yang Chum Noi	33
Bang Klam Hospital	Songkhla	Bang Klam	40
Chana Hospital	Songkhla	Chana	64
Her Majesty the Queen's Hospital Na Thawi	Songkhla	Na Thawi	150
Khlong Hoi Khong Hospital	Songkhla	Khlong Hoi Khong	30
Khuan Niang Hospital	Songkhla	Khuan Niang	39
Krasae Sin Hospital	Songkhla	Krasae Sin	30
Na Mom Hospital	Songkhla	Na Mom	30
Padang Besar Hospital	Songkhla	Sadao	34
Ranot Hospital	Songkhla	Ranot	62
Rattaphum Hospital	Songkhla	Rattaphum	73
Saba Yoi Hospital	Songkhla	Saba Yoi	30
Sadao Hospital	Songkhla	Sadao	74
Sathing Phra Hospital	Songkhla	Sathing Phra	42
Singhanakhon Hospital	Songkhla	Singhanakhon	30
Thepha Hospital	Songkhla	Thepha	60
Ban Dan Lan Hoi Hospital	Sukhothai	Ban Dan Lan Hoi	35
Khiri Mat Hospital	Sukhothai	Khiri Mat	50
Kong Krailat Hospital	Sukhothai	Kong Krailat	41
Sawankhalok Hospital	Sukhothai	Sawankhalok	111
Si Nakhon Hospital	Sukhothai	Si Nakhon	30
Si Satchanalai Hospital	Sukhothai	Si Satchanalai	60
Thung Saliam Hospital	Sukhothai	Thung Saliam	40
Bang Pla Ma Hospital	Suphan Buri	Bang Pla Ma	60
Dan Chang Hospital	Suphan Buri	Dan Chang	111
Doem Bang Nang Buat Hospital	Suphan Buri	Doem Bang Nang Buat	109
Don Chedi Hospital	Suphan Buri	Don Chedi	60
Nong Ya Sai Hospital	Suphan Buri	Nong Ya Sai	60
Sam Chuk Hospital	Suphan Buri	Sam Chuk	83
Si Prachan Hospital	Suphan Buri	Si Prachan	60
U Thong Hospital	Suphan Buri	U Thong	134
Ban Na Doem Hospital	Surat Thani	Ban Na Doem	30
Ban Na San Hospital	Surat Thani	Ban Na San	65
Ban Ta Khun Hospital	Surat Thani	Ban Ta Khun	30
Chai Buri Hospital	Surat Thani	Chai Buri	30
Chaiya Hospital	Surat Thani	Chaiya	60
Don Sak Hospital	Surat Thani	Don Sak	30
Kanchanadit Hospital	Surat Thani	Kanchanadit	120
Khian Sa Hospital	Surat Thani	Khian Sa	32
Khiri Rat Nikhom Hospital	Surat Thani	Khiri Rat Nikhom	40
Ko Pha-ngan Hospital	Surat Thani	Ko Pha-ngan	50
Ko Tao Hospital	Surat Thani	Ko Pha-ngan	10
Phanom Hospital	Surat Thani	Phanom	30
Phrasaeng Hospital	Surat Thani	Phrasaeng	60
Phunphin Hospital	Surat Thani	Phunphin	60
Tha Chana Hospital	Surat Thani	Tha Chana	30
Tha Chang Hospital	Surat Thani	Tha Chang	30
Tha Rong Chang Hospital	Surat Thani	Tha Rong Chang	90
Vibhavadi Hospital	Surat Thani	Vibhavadi	30
Wiang Sa Crown Prince Hospital	Surat Thani	Wiang Sa	120
Bua Chet Hospital	Surin	Bua Chet	50
Chom Phra Hospital	Surin	Chom Phra	60
Chumphon Buri Hospital	Surin	Chumphon Buri	60
Kap Choeng Hospital	Surin	Kap Choeng	97
Khwao Sinarin Hospital	Surin	Khwao Sinarin	30
Lamduan Hospital	Surin	Lamduan	115
Non Narai Hospital	Surin	Non Narai	30
Phanom Dongrak Chaloem Phrakiat Hospital	Surin	Phanom Dongrak	30
Rattanaburi Hospital	Surin	Rattanaburi	130
Samrong Thap Hospital	Surin	Samrong Thap	66
Sangkha Hospital	Surin	Sangkha	216
Sanom Hospital	Surin	Sanom	39
Si Narong Hospital	Surin	Si Narong	36
Tha Tum Hospital	Surin	Tha Tum	140
Ban Tak Hospital	Tak	Ban Tak	65
Mae Ramat Hospital	Tak	Mae Ramat	120
Phop Phra Hospital	Tak	Phop Phra	136
Sam Ngao Hospital	Tak	Sam Ngao	36
Tha Song Yang Hospital	Tak	Tha Song Yang	100
Umphang Hospital	Tak	Umphang	75
Wang Chao Hospital	Tak	Wang Chao	30
Hat Samran Chaloem Phrakiat Hospital	Trang	Hat Samran	37
Huai Yot Hospital	Trang	Huai Yot	100
Kantang Hospital	Trang	Kantang	95
Na Yong Hospital	Trang	Na Yong	60
Palian Hospital	Trang	Palian	40
Ratsada Hospital	Trang	Ratsada	49
Sikao Hospital	Trang	Sikao	48
Wang Wiset Hospital	Trang	Wang Wiset	34
Yan Ta Khao Hospital	Trang	Yan Ta Khao	94
Bo Rai Hospital	Trat	Bo Rai	37
Khao Saming Hospital	Trat	Khao Saming	36
Khlong Yai Hospital	Trat	Khlong Yai	39
Ko Chang Hospital	Trat	Ko Chang	26
Ko Kut Hospital	Trat	Ko Kut	7
Laem Ngop Hospital	Trat	Laem Ngop	30
Buntharik Hospital	Ubon Ratchathani	Buntharik	61
Don Mot Daeng Hospital	Ubon Ratchathani	Don Mot Daeng	30
Khemarat Hospital	Ubon Ratchathani	Khemarat	60
Khong Chiam Hospital	Ubon Ratchathani	Khong Chiam	30
Khueang Nai Hospital	Ubon Ratchathani	Khueang Nai	120
Kut Khao Pun Hospital	Ubon Ratchathani	Kut Khao Pun	30
Lao Suea Kok Hospital	Ubon Ratchathani	Lao Suea Kok	30
Muang Sam Sip Hospital	Ubon Ratchathani	Muang Sam Sip	90
Na Chaluai Hospital	Ubon Ratchathani	Na Chaluai	30
Na Tan Hospital	Ubon Ratchathani	Na Tan	30
Na Yia Hospital	Ubon Ratchathani	Na Yia	30
Nam Khun Hospital	Ubon Ratchathani	Nam Khun	30
Nam Yuen Hospital	Ubon Ratchathani	Nam Yuen	80
Phibun Mangsahan Hospital	Ubon Ratchathani	Phibun Mangsahan	154
Pho Sai Hospital	Ubon Ratchathani	Pho Sai	40
Samrong Hospital	Ubon Ratchathani	Samrong	30
Sawang Wirawong Hospital	Ubon Ratchathani	Sawang Wirawong	30
Si Mueang Mai Hospital	Ubon Ratchathani	Si Mueang Mai	60
Sirindhorn Hospital	Ubon Ratchathani	Sirindhorn	30
Tan Sum Hospital	Ubon Ratchathani	Tan Sum	30
Thung Si Udom Hospital	Ubon Ratchathani	Thung Si Udom	30
Ban Dung Crown Prince Hospital	Udon Thani	Ban Dung	139
Ban Phue Hospital	Udon Thani	Ban Phue	126
Chai Wan Hospital	Udon Thani	Chai Wan	30
Huai Koeng Hospital	Udon Thani	Huai Koeng	8
Ku Kaeo Hospital	Udon Thani	Ku Kaeo	30
Kut Chap Hospital	Udon Thani	Kut Chap	60
Na Yung Hospital	Udon Thani	Na Yung	30
Nam Som Hospital	Udon Thani	Nam Som	60
Non Sa-at Hospital	Udon Thani	Non Sa-at	40
Nong Han Hospital	Udon Thani	Nong Han	137
Nong Saeng Hospital	Udon Thani	Nong Saeng	30
Nong Wua So Hospital	Udon Thani	Nong Wua So	60
Phen Hospital	Udon Thani	Phen	114
Phibun Rak Hospital	Udon Thani	Phibun Rak	30
Prachaksinlapakhom Hospital	Udon Thani	Prachaksinlapakhom	30
Sang Khom Hospital	Udon Thani	Sang Khom	30
Si That Hospital	Udon Thani	Si That	30
Thung Fon Hospital	Udon Thani	Thung Fon	30
Wang Sam Mo Hospital	Udon Thani	Wang Sam Mo	55
Ban Rai Hospital	Uthai Thani	Ban Rai	62
Huai Khot Hospital	Uthai Thani	Huai Khot	30
Lan Sak Hospital	Uthai Thani	Lan Sak	60
Nong Chang Hospital	Uthai Thani	Nong Chang	90
Nong Kha Yang Hospital	Uthai Thani	Nong Kha Yang	10
Sawang Arom Hospital	Uthai Thani	Sawang Arom	30
Thap Than Hospital	Uthai Thani	Thap Than	90
Ban Khok Hospital	Uttaradit	Ban Khok	31
Fak Tha Hospital	Uttaradit	Fak Tha	30
Lap Lae Hospital	Uttaradit	Lap Lae	50
Nam Pat Hospital	Uttaradit	Nam Pat	30
Phichai Hospital	Uttaradit	Phichai	70
Tha Pla Hospital	Uttaradit	Tha Pla	30
Thong Saen Khan Hospital	Uttaradit	Thong Saen Khan	36
Tron Hospital	Uttaradit	Tron	35
Bannang Sata Hospital	Yala	Bannang Sata	60
Kabang Hospital	Yala	Kabang	30
Krong Pinang Hospital	Yala	Krong Pinang	30
Raman Hospital	Yala	Raman	90
Than To Hospital	Yala	Than To	36
Yaha Crown Prince Hospital	Yala	Yaha	90
Kham Khuean Kaeo Hospital	Yasothon	Kham Khuean Kaeo	60
Kho Wang Hospital	Yasothon	Kho Wang	30
Kut Chum Hospital	Yasothon	Kut Chum	30
Loeng Nok Tha Crown Prince Hospital	Yasothon	Loeng Nok Tha	120
Maha Chana Chai Hospital	Yasothon	Maha Chana Chai	30
Pa Tio Hospital	Yasothon	Pa Tio	30
Sai Mun Hospital	Yasothon	Sai Mun	30
Thai Charoen Hospital	Yasothon	Thai Charoen	30

==== Department of Disease Control ====
Name	Operator/affiliation^{a}	Type	Specialty	Province	District	Beds
Bamrasnaradura Infectious Diseases Institute	Department of Disease Control	Specialised	Infectious diseases	Nonthaburi	Mueang	650
Ratchapracha Samasai Institute	Department of Disease Control	Specialised	Leprosy	Samut Prakan	Phra Pradaeng	152

==== Department of Medical Services ====
Name	Operator/affiliation^{a}	Type	Specialty	Province	District	Beds
Institute of Dermatology	Department of Medical Services	Specialised	Dermatology	Bangkok	Ratchathewi	43
Lerdsin Hospital	Department of Medical Services	Teaching		Bangkok	Bang Rak	500
National Cancer Institute	Department of Medical Services	Specialised	Oncology	Bangkok	Ratchathewi	200
Neurological Institute of Thailand	Department of Medical Services	Specialised	Neurology	Bangkok	Ratchathewi	300
Nopparat Rajathanee Hospital	Department of Medical Services	Teaching		Bangkok	Khan Na Yao	510
Priest Hospital	Department of Medical Services			Bangkok	Ratchathewi	937
Queen Sirikit National Institute of Child Health	Department of Medical Services	Specialised, Teaching	Paediatrics	Bangkok	Ratchathewi	435
Rajavithi Hospital	Department of Medical Services	Teaching		Bangkok	Ratchathewi	1200
Chiang Mai Neurological Hospital	Department of Medical Services	Specialised	Neurology	Chiang Mai	Mueang	240
Thanyarak Chiang Mai Hospital	Department of Medical Services	Drug rehabilitation		Chiang Mai	Mae Rim	500
Chonburi Cancer Hospital	Department of Medical Services	Specialised	Oncology	Chonburi	Chon Buri	167
Thanyarak Khon Kaen Hospital	Department of Medical Services	Drug rehabilitation		Khon Kaen	Mueang	114
Lampang Cancer Hospital	Department of Medical Services	Specialised	Oncology	Lampang	Mueang	137
Lopburi Cancer Hospital	Department of Medical Services	Specialised	Oncology	Lopburi	Mueang	170
Thanyarak Mae Hong Son Hospital	Department of Medical Services	Drug rehabilitation		Mae Hong Son	Mueang	46
Mettapracharak Watraikhing Hospital	Department of Medical Services	Specialised	Ophthalmology	Nakhon Pathom	Sam Phran	150
Central Chest Institute of Thailand	Department of Medical Services	Specialised	Pulmonology	Nonthaburi	Mueang	400
Institute of Geriatric Medicine	Department of Medical Services	Specialised	Geriatrics	Nonthaburi	Mueang	
Sirindhorn National Medical Rehabilitation Centre	Department of Medical Services	Specialised	PM&R	Nonthaburi	Mueang	48
Maha Vajiralongkorn Cancer Centre	Department of Medical Services	Specialised, Teaching	Oncology	Pathum Thani	Thanyaburi	116
Thanyarak Institute	Department of Medical Services	Drug rehabilitation		Pathum Thani	Thanyaburi	670
Thanyarak Pattani Hospital	Department of Medical Services	Drug rehabilitation		Pattani	Mueang	110
Thanyarak Songkhla Hospital	Department of Medical Services	Drug rehabilitation		Songkhla	Mueang	200
Surat Thani Cancer Hospital	Department of Medical Services	Specialised	Oncology	Surat Thani	Mueang	90
Southern Regional Hospital of Tropical Dermatology	Department of Medical Services	Specialised	Dermatology	Trang	Mueang	30
Ubon Ratchathani Cancer Hospital	Department of Medical Services	Specialised	Oncology	Ubon Ratchathani	Mueang	114
Udon Thani Cancer Hospital	Department of Medical Services	Specialised	Oncology	Udon Thani	Mueang	91
Thanyarak Udon Thani Hospital	Department of Medical Services	Drug rehabilitation		Udon Thani	Mueang	60

==== Department of Mental Health ====
Name	Operator/affiliation^{a}	Type	Specialty	Province	District	Beds (As of 2018)
Galaya Rajanakarindra Institute	Department of Mental Health	Specialised	Psychiatry	Bangkok	Lak Si	185
Rajanukul Institute	Department of Mental Health	Specialised	Psychiatry	Bangkok	Din Daeng	260
Somdet Chaopraya Institute of Psychiatry	Department of Mental Health	Specialised	Psychiatry	Bangkok	Khlong San	500
Rajanagarindra Institute of Child Development	Department of Mental Health	Specialised	Psychiatry	Chiang Mai	Mae Rim	60
Suanprung Psychiatric Hospital	Department of Mental Health	Specialised	Psychiatry	Chiang Mai	Mueang	415
Khon Kaen Rajanakarindra Psychiatric Hospital	Department of Mental Health	Specialised	Psychiatry	Khon Kaen	Mueang	250
Northeastern Institute of Child and Adolescent Mental Health	Department of Mental Health	Specialised	Psychiatry	Khon Kaen	Mueang	12
Loei Rajanakarindra Psychiatric Hospital	Department of Mental Health	Specialised	Psychiatry	Loei	Mueang	120
Nakhon Phanom Rajanakarindra Psychiatric Hospital	Department of Mental Health	Specialised	Psychiatry	Nakhon Phanom	Mueang	90
Nakhon Ratchasima Rajanakarindra Psychiatric Hospital	Department of Mental Health	Specialised	Psychiatry	Nakhon Ratchasima	Mueang	270
Nakhon Sawan Rajanakarindra Psychiatric Hospital	Department of Mental Health	Specialised	Psychiatry	Nakhon Sawan	Phayuha Khiri	94
Srithanya Hospital	Department of Mental Health	Specialised	Psychiatry	Nonthaburi	Mueang	750
Phitsanulok Psychiatric Hospital	Department of Mental Health	Specialised	Psychiatry	Phitsanulok	Wang Thong	0
Sa Kaeo Rajanakarindra Psychiatric Hospital	Department of Mental Health	Specialised	Psychiatry	Sa Kaeo	Watthana Nakhon	92
Yuwaprasart Waithayopathum Hospital	Department of Mental Health	Specialised	Psychiatry	Samut Prakan	Mueang	150
Songkhla Rajanakarindra Psychiatric Hospital	Department of Mental Health	Specialised	Psychiatry	Songkhla	Mueang	200
Suan Saranrom Psychiatric Hospital and Southern Institute of Child and Adolescent Mental Health	Department of Mental Health	Specialised	Psychiatry	Surat Thani	Phun Phin	480
Prasrimahabhodi Psychiatric Hospital	Department of Mental Health	Specialised	Psychiatry	Ubon Ratchathani	Mueang	360

==== Public Organisation ====
Name	Province	District	Beds
Ban Phaeo General Hospital	Samut Sakhon	Ban Phaeo	323

=== University Hospitals ===
Includes only hospitals operated directly by a university. Most of these hospitals are among the largest in Thailand and offer extremely specialised medical services ("super-tertiary care") not available elsewhere. It is generally the final referral level for complicated and rare diseases.

Name	Operator/affiliation^{a}	Type	Specialty	Province	District	Beds
Chulabhorn Hospital (Bangkok)	Chulabhorn Royal Academy	Teaching, Specialised	Oncology	Bangkok	Lak Si	100
Hospital for Tropical Diseases	Mahidol University	Specialised	Tropical diseases	Bangkok	Ratchathewi	250
Hospital of the Faculty of Dentistry, Chulalongkorn University	Chulalongkorn University	Specialised	Dentistry	Bangkok	Pathum Wan	40
Mahidol University Dental Hospital	Mahidol University	Specialised	Dentistry	Bangkok	Ratchathewi	
Ramathibodi Hospital	Mahidol University	Teaching		Bangkok	Ratchathewi	1023
Siriraj Hospital	Mahidol University	Teaching		Bangkok	Bangkok Noi	2145
Siriraj Piyamaharajkarun Hospital	Mahidol University			Bangkok	Bangkok Noi	280
Vajira Hospital	Navamindradhiraj University	Teaching		Bangkok	Dusit	740
Dental Hospital, Faculty of Dentistry, Chiang Mai University	Chiang Mai University	Specialised	Dentistry	Chiang Mai	Mueang	5
Maharaj Nakorn Chiang Mai Hospital	Chiang Mai University	Teaching		Chiang Mai	Mueang	1282
Mae Fah Luang University Hospital	Mae Fah Luang University	Teaching		Chiang Rai	Mueang	107
Burapha University Hospital	Burapha University	Teaching		Chonburi	Mueang	100
Queen Sirikit Heart Center of the Northeast	Khon Kaen University	Specialised	Cardiology	Khon Kaen	Mueang	200
Srinagarind Hospital	Khon Kaen University	Teaching		Khon Kaen	Mueang	1120
Suddhavej Hospital	Mahasarakham University	Teaching		Maha Sarakham	Mueang	125
HRH Princess Maha Chakri Sirindhorn Medical Center	Srinakharinwirot University	Teaching		Nakhon Nayok	Ongkharak	433
Golden Jubilee Medical Center	Mahidol University			Nakhon Pathom	Phutthamonthon	108
Maha Chakri Sirindhorn Dental Hospital	Mahidol University	Specialised	Dentistry	Nakhon Pathom	Phutthamonthon	
Suranaree University of Technology Hospital	Suranaree University of Technology	Teaching		Nakhon Ratchasima	Mueang	120
Walailak University Hospital	Walailak University	Teaching		Nakhon Si Thammarat	Tha Sala	30
Galyanivadhanakarun Hospital	Princess of Naradhiwas University	Teaching		Narathiwat	Mueang	22
Panyananthaphikkhu Chonprathan Medical Center	Srinakharinwirot University	Teaching		Nonthaburi	Mueang	400
Thammasat University Hospital	Thammasat University	Teaching		Pathum Thani	Khlong Luang	844
University of Phayao Medical Center and Hospital	University of Phayao	Teaching		Phayao	Mueang	60
Naresuan University Hospital	Naresuan University	Teaching		Phitsanulok	Mueang	362
Dental Hospital, Faculty of Dentistry, Naresuan University	Naresuan University	Specialised	Dentistry	Phitsanulok	Mueang	
Chakri Naruebodindra Medical Institute	Mahidol University	Teaching		Samut Prakan	Bang Phli	124
Prince of Songkla University Dental Hospital	Prince of Songkla University	Specialised	Dentistry	Songkhla	Hat Yai	14
Songklanagarind Hospital	Prince of Songkla University	Teaching		Songkhla	Hat Yai	844
Ubon Ratchathani University Hospital	Ubon Ratchathani University	Teaching		Ubon Ratchathani	Warin Chamrap	112

=== Military and Police ===
Operated by branches of the Royal Thai Armed Forces.

Name	Operator/affiliation^{a}	Type	Province	District	Beds
Bhumibol Adulyadej Hospital	Royal Thai Air Force	Teaching	Bangkok	Sai Mai	774
Bangkok Naval Hospital	Royal Thai Navy		Bangkok	Bang Na	230
Naval Ordnance Hospital	Royal Thai Navy		Bangkok	Bang Na	22
Nawutti Somdet Ya Hospital	Royal Thai Police		Bangkok	Phaya Thai	
Phramongkutklao Hospital	Royal Thai Army	Teaching	Bangkok	Ratchathewi	1236
Police General Hospital	Royal Thai Police	Teaching	Bangkok	Pathum Wan	736
Royal Thai Air Force Hospital (Si Kan)	Royal Thai Air Force		Bangkok	Don Mueang	150
Somdech Phra Pinklao Hospital	Royal Thai Navy	Teaching	Bangkok	Thon Buri	507
Veterans General Hospital	Ministry of Defense		Bangkok	Phaya Thai	223
Fort Somdetchaophrayamahakasatsuek Hospital	Royal Thai Army		Buriram	Mueang	30
Dara Rasmi Hospital	Royal Thai Police		Chiang Mai	Mae Rim	30
Fort Kawila Hospital	Royal Thai Army		Chiang Mai	Mueang	90
Royal Thai Air Force Wing 41 Hospital	Royal Thai Air Force		Chiang Mai	Mueang	30
Fort Mengraimaharat Hospital	Royal Thai Army		Chiang Rai	Mueang	30
Abhakara Kiartivongse Hospital	Royal Thai Navy		Chonburi	Sattahip	300
Fort Nawamintharachini Hospital	Royal Thai Army		Chonburi	Mueang	60
Queen Sirikit Naval Hospital	Royal Thai Navy	Teaching	Chonburi	Sattahip	240
Fort Khet Udomsak Hospital	Royal Thai Army		Chumphon	Mueang	60
Fort Surasi Hospital	Royal Thai Army		Kanchanaburi	Lat Ya	80
Fort Siphatcharin Hospital	Royal Thai Army		Khon Kaen	Mueang	30
Fort Surasakmontri Hospital	Royal Thai Army		Lampang	Mueang	150
Fort Srisongrak Hospital	Royal Thai Army		Loei	Mueang	30
Ananda Mahidol Hospital	Royal Thai Army	Teaching	Lopburi	Mueang	400
Royal Thai Air Force Wing 2 Hospital	Royal Thai Air Force		Lopburi	Mueang	30
Chulachomklao Royal Military Academy Hospital	Royal Thai Army		Nakhon Nayok	Mueang	90
Chandrubeksa Hospital	Royal Thai Air Force	Teaching	Nakhon Pathom	Kamphaeng Saen	350
Fort Phrayotmueangkhwang Hospital	Royal Thai Army		Nakhon Phanom	Mueang	30
Fort Suranari Hospital	Royal Thai Army	Teaching	Nakhon Ratchasima	Mueang	420
Royal Thai Air Force Wing 1 Hospital	Royal Thai Air Force		Nakhon Ratchasima	Mueang	50
Fort Jiraprawat Hospital	Royal Thai Army		Nakhon Sawan	Mueang	150
Royal Thai Air Force Wing 4 Hospital	Royal Thai Air Force		Nakhon Sawan	Takhli	50
Fort Thepsatrisisunthon Hospital	Royal Thai Army		Nakhon Si Thammarat	Thung Song	90
Fort Vajiravudh Hospital	Royal Thai Army		Nakhon Si Thammarat	Mueang	150
Fort Suriyaphong Hospital	Royal Thai Army		Nan	Phu Phiang	20
Fort Inkhayutthaborihan Hospital	Royal Thai Army		Pattani	Nong Chik	30
Phang Nga Naval Base Hospital	Royal Thai Navy		Phang Nga	Thai Mueang	10
Fort Khunchueangthammikkarat Hospital	Royal Thai Army		Phayao	Mueang	30
Fort Phokhunphamueang Hospital	Royal Thai Army		Phetchabun	Mueang	30
Fort Ramratchaniwet Hospital	Royal Thai Army		Phetchaburi	Mueang	10
Fort Saritsena Hospital	Royal Thai Army		Phitsanulok	Wang Thong	15
Fort Somdet Phra Naresuan Maharat Hospital	Royal Thai Army		Phitsanulok	Mueang	150
Royal Thai Air Force Wing 46 Hospital	Royal Thai Air Force		Phitsanulok	Mueang	50
Fort Chakkraphong Hospital	Royal Thai Army		Prachinburi	Mueang	180
Fort Thanarat Hospital	Royal Thai Army		Prachuap Khiri Khan	Pran Buri	100
Royal Thai Air Force Wing 5 Hospital	Royal Thai Air Force		Prachuap Khiri Khan	Mueang	30
Fort Phanurangsi Hospital	Royal Thai Army		Ratchaburi	Mueang	60
Fort Somdet Phraphutthayotfa Chulalok Maharat Hospital	Royal Thai Army		Roi Et	Si Somdet	60
Fort Surasinghanat Hospital	Royal Thai Army		Sa Kaeo	Aranyaprathet	60
Fort Krit Srivara Hospital	Royal Thai Army		Sakon Nakhon	Mueang	60
Phra Chulachomklao Fort Hospital	Royal Thai Navy		Samut Prakan	Phra Samut Chedi	10
Royal Thai Naval Academy Hospital	Royal Thai Navy		Samut Prakan	Mueang	30
Fort Adisorn Hospital	Royal Thai Army		Saraburi	Mueang	60
Fort Senanarong Hospital	Royal Thai Army		Songkhla	Hat Yai	90
Royal Thai Air Force Wing 56 Hospital	Royal Thai Air Force		Songkhla	Khlong Hoi Khong	15
Songkhla Naval Base Hospital	Royal Thai Navy		Songkhla	Mueang	30
Fort Vibhavadi Rangsit Hospital	Royal Thai Army		Surat Thani	Mueang	25
Royal Thai Air Force Wing 7 Hospital	Royal Thai Air Force		Surat Thani	Phun Phin	50
Fort Weerawatyothin Hospital	Royal Thai Army		Surin	Mueang	60
Fort Wachiraprakan Hospital	Royal Thai Army		Tak	Mueang	10
Fort Sunpasitthiprasong Hospital	Royal Thai Army		Ubon Ratchathani	Warin Chamrap	200
Royal Thai Air Force Wing 21 Hospital	Royal Thai Air Force		Ubon Ratchathani	Mueang	10
Fort Prachaksilapakhom Hospital	Royal Thai Army		Udon Thani	Mueang	150
Royal Thai Air Force Wing 23 Hospital	Royal Thai Air Force		Udon Thani	Mueang	30
Fort Phichai Dabhak Hospital	Royal Thai Army		Uttaradit	Mueang	60
Yala Siri Rattanarak Hospital	Royal Thai Police		Yala	Mueang	

=== Bangkok Metropolitan Administration ===
All hospitals are operated by the Medical Services Department, Bangkok Metropolitan Administration.

Name	Type	Specialty	Province	District	Beds
Bang Khun Thian Geriatric Hospital	Specialised	Geriatrics	Bangkok	Bang Khun Thian	300
Bangkok Metropolitan Administration General Hospital (Klang Hospital)	Teaching		Bangkok	Pom Prap Sattru Phai	408
Bang Na Hospital			Bangkok	Bang Na	324
Charoenkrung Pracharak Hospital	Teaching		Bangkok	Bang Kho Laem	417
Khlong Sam Wa Hospital			Bangkok	Khlong Sam Wa	250
Lat Krabang Hospital	Teaching		Bangkok	Lat Krabang	30
Luang Pho Taweesak Hospital	Teaching		Bangkok	Nong Khaem	60
Ratchaphiphat Hospital	Teaching		Bangkok	Bang Khae	102
Sirindhorn Hospital	Teaching		Bangkok	Prawet	136
Taksin Hospital	Teaching		Bangkok	Khlong San	393
Wetchakarunrasm Hospital			Bangkok	Nong Chok	76

=== Thai Red Cross Society ===
All hospitals are operated by the Thai Red Cross Society.

Name	Type	Specialty	Province	District	Beds
King Chulalongkorn Memorial Hospital	Teaching		Bangkok	Pathum Wan	1442
Thai Red Cross Relief and Public Health Bureau			Bangkok	Pathum Wan	61
Queen Savang Vadhana Memorial Hospital	Teaching		Chonburi	Si Racha	500
Sirindhorn Red Cross Health Station			Nakhon Si Thammarat	Thung Song	10
Hua Hin Chalerm Prakiet Red Cross Health Station			Prachuap Khiri Khan	Hua Hin	10
Thai Red Cross Rehabilitation Center	Specialised	PM&R	Samut Prakan	Mueang	80

=== Other Governmental Ministries and Organisations ===
Name	Operator/affiliation^{a}	Province	District	Beds
Burachat Chaiyakorn Hospital	State Railway of Thailand	Bangkok	Ratchathewi	120
Central Correctional Hospital	Ministry of Justice	Bangkok	Chatuchak	320
Metropolitan Electricity Authority Hospital	Metropolitan Electricity Authority	Bangkok	Dusit	120
Port Authority of Thailand Hospital	Port Authority of Thailand	Bangkok	Khlong Toei	
Prasarnmit Hospital	Anti-Tuberculosis Association of Thailand	Bangkok	Phaya Thai	50
Thailand Tobacco Monopoly Hospital	Ministry of Finance	Bangkok	Khlong Toei	82
Chiang Mai Municipality Hospital	Chiang Mai City Municipality	Chiang Mai	Mueang	22
Pattaya City Hospital	Pattaya City	Chonburi	Bang Lamung	
Tulakan Chaloem Phrakiat Hospital	Ministry of Justice	Nakhon Pathom	Phutthamonthon	60
Nakhon Si Thammarat City Hospital	Nakhon Si Thammarat City Municipality	Nakhon Si Thammarat	Mueang	30
Phuket Provincial Hospital	Phuket Provincial Administration	Phuket	Mueang	129
Surat Thani Provincial Hospital	Surat Thani Provincial Administration	Surat Thani	Mueang	
Udon Thani City Hospital	Udon Thani City Municipality	Udon Thani	Mueang	

== Private Hospitals ==
As of March 2022, there were 404 private hospitals that are available for patient admission (400 single-entity hospitals), registered with the Medical Registration Division, Department of Health Service Support, the Ministry of Public Health. The list is in alphabetical order by hospital name, for each province which is again listed alphabetically.

Name	Operator/affiliation^{a}	Type	Specialty	Province	District	Beds
Asoke Skin Hospital		Specialised	Dermatology	Bangkok	Huai Khwang	9
Asoke Skin Hospital Pinklao Branch		Specialised	Dermatology	Bangkok	Bangkok Noi	10
B.Care Medical Center		General		Bangkok	Sai Mai	136
Bangkhunthian 1 Hospital	Praram 2 Hospital	General health centre		Bangkok	Bang Khun Thian	15
Bangkok Adventist (Mission) Hospital	Seventh-day Adventist Christian Foundation of Thailand	General		Bangkok	Dusit	120
Bangkok Cancer Specialised Hospital		Specialised	Oncology	Bangkok	Phaya Thai	30
Bangkok Christian Hospital	Church of Christ in Thailand	General		Bangkok	Bang Rak	244
Bangkok Heart Hospital	Bangkok Dusit Medical Services	Specialised	Cardiology, Cardiothoracic Surgery	Bangkok	Huai Khwang	51
Bangkok Hospital	Bangkok Dusit Medical Services	General		Bangkok	Huai Khwang	263
Bangkok International Hospital	Bangkok Dusit Medical Services	Specialised	Neurology, Orthopedics	Bangkok	Huai Khwang	172
Bangkok International Dental Hospital	Bangkok Dusit Medical Services	Specialised	Dentistry	Bangkok	Huai Khwang	4
Bangmod Hospital		General		Bangkok	Chom Thong	203
Bangna 1 Hospital	Bangna General Hospital	General		Bangkok	Bang Na	101
Bangpakok Ayuravej Hospital	Bangpakok Hospital Group	Specialised		Bangkok	Rat Burana	55
Bangpakok 1 Hospital	Bangpakok Hospital Group	General		Bangkok	Rat Burana	120
Bangpakok 8 Hospital	Bangpakok Hospital Group	General		Bangkok	Bang Bon	120
Bangpakok 9 International Hospital	Bangpakok Hospital Group	General		Bangkok	Chom Thong	200
Bangphai Hospital		General		Bangkok	Phasi Charoen	100
Bangpo General Hospital		General		Bangkok	Bang Sue	100
BBH Hospital		Chronic care centre		Bangkok	Watthana	8
Bhumirajanakarindra Kidney Institute Hospital		Specialised	Nephrology, Renal Transplantation	Bangkok	Ratchathewi	141
BNH Hospital	Bangkok Dusit Medical Services	General		Bangkok	Bang Rak	86
Boonyavej Hospital		General		Bangkok	Bang Khae	29
Bumrungrad International Hospital		General		Bangkok	Watthana	580
Camillian Hospital	St. Camillus Foundation of Thailand	General		Bangkok	Watthana	120
CGH Hospital	CGH Hospital Group	General		Bangkok	Bang Khen	120
CGH Hospital Saimai	CGH Hospital Group	General		Bangkok	Sai Mai	100
Chaophya Hospital		General		Bangkok	Bangkok Noi	200
Chersery Home		Chronic care centre		Bangkok	Phasi Charoen	20
Chinnakhet Hospital		General		Bangkok	Lak Si	30
Chiva Transitional Care	Bangkok Dusit Medical Services	Chronic care centre		Bangkok	Huai Khwang	52
Dental Hospital		Specialised	Dentistry	Bangkok	Watthana	2
Dr. Panya General Hospital	Ramkhamhaeng-Vibhavadi-Synphaet-Vibharam Hospitals Group	General		Bangkok	Suan Luang	125
Eye Ear Nose Throat Hospital		Specialised	Ophthalmology, ENT	Bangkok	Bang Phlat	30
Golden Years Hospital		Specialised		Bangkok	Huai Khwang	60
Hua Chiew Hospital	Poh Teck Tung Foundation	General		Bangkok	Pom Prap Sattru Phai	338
Humantouch Hospital		General		Bangkok	Nong Khaem	1
Intermed Hospital		Specialised		Bangkok	Phasi Charoen	3
Intrarat Hospital		General		Bangkok	Khan Na Yao	82
Japanese Hospital by Samitivej	Bangkok Dusit Medical Services	General		Bangkok	Watthana	30
Jetanin Institute for Assisted Reproduction		Specialised	Obstetrics	Bangkok	Pathum Wan	9
Kasemrad Hospital Bangkae	Bangkok Chain Hospital PCL	General		Bangkok	Bang Khae	311
Kasemrad Hospital Prachachuen	Bangkok Chain Hospital PCL	General		Bangkok	Bang Sue	362
Kasemrad Hospital Ramkhamhaeng	Bangkok Chain Hospital PCL	General		Bangkok	Saphan Sung	139
kdms Hospital		Specialised	Orthopedics	Bangkok	Lat Phrao	24
Klongtun Hospital		General		Bangkok	Huai Khwang	30
Kluaynamthai 2 Geriatric Hospital		Specialised	Geriatrics	Bangkok	Bang Na	90
Kluaynamthai Hospital		General		Bangkok	Khlong Toei	160
Kwongsiew Foundation Hospital	Kwongsiew Foundation	Chronic care centre		Bangkok	Pom Prap Sattru Phai	30
Kamol Cosmetic Hospital		Specialised	Plastic Surgery	Bangkok	Wang Thonglang	30
Ladprao General Hospital	Ladprao Hospital	General		Bangkok	Wang Thonglang	180
Ladprao Polyclinic	Ladprao Hospital	General		Bangkok	Wang Thonglang	26
Mahesak Hospital	Ramkhamhaeng-Vibhavadi-Synphaet-Vibharam Hospitals Group	General		Bangkok	Bang Rak	132
Mali Interdisciplinary Hospital		General		Bangkok	Bang Bon	19
Manarom Hospital		Specialised	Psychiatry	Bangkok	Bang Na	30
Masterpiece Hospital		Specialised	Plastic Surgery	Bangkok	Dusit	7
MedPark Hospital		General		Bangkok	Khlong Toei	205
Milada Cosmetic Surgery Hospital		Specialised	Plastic Surgery	Bangkok	Bang Kho Laem	8
Mitrpracha Hospital		General		Bangkok	Phasi Charoen	148
Mongkutwattana Hospital		General		Bangkok	Lak Si	100
Nakornthon Hospital		General		Bangkok	Bang Khun Thian	150
Namarak Hospital		Specialised	Oncologic Surgery	Bangkok	Huai Khwang	10
Nan Ah Hospital		General		Bangkok	Khlong San	30
Navaminthra 9 Hospital	Navaminthra Hospital	General		Bangkok	Min Buri	245
Navaminthra Hospital		General		Bangkok	Min Buri	180
Navavej International Hospital		General		Bangkok	Bueng Kum	99
Paolo Memorial Hospital Chokchai 4	Bangkok Dusit Medical Services	General		Bangkok	Lat Phrao	169
Paolo Memorial Hospital Kaset	Bangkok Dusit Medical Services	General		Bangkok	Chatuchak	162
Paolo Memorial Hospital Phaholyothin	Bangkok Dusit Medical Services	General		Bangkok	Phaya Thai	220
Passarapiban Nursing Home		Chronic care centre		Bangkok	Wang Thonglang	29
Petcharavej Hospital		General		Bangkok	Huai Khwang	200
Phim Hospital		Chronic care centre		Bangkok	Bang Khun Thian	26
Phyathai Nawamin Hospital	Bangkok Dusit Medical Services	General		Bangkok	Bueng Kum	140
Phyathai 1 Hospital	Bangkok Dusit Medical Services	General		Bangkok	Ratchathewi	174
Phyathai 2 Hospital	Bangkok Dusit Medical Services	General		Bangkok	Phaya Thai	260
Phyathai 3 Hospital	Bangkok Dusit Medical Services	General		Bangkok	Phasi Charoen	230
Pink Park Village		Chronic care centre	Oncology	Bangkok	Nong Chok	24
Piyavate Hospital		General		Bangkok	Huai Khwang	150
PMG Hospital		General		Bangkok	Bang Khun Thian	109
Prachapat Hospital		General		Bangkok	Rat Burana	100
Praram 9 Hospital		General		Bangkok	Huai Khwang	166
Praram 9 Medical Center		General		Bangkok	Huai Khwang	38
Rajburana Hospital		General		Bangkok	Rat Burana	124
Ramkhamhaeng Hospital	Ramkhamhaeng Hospital Group	General		Bangkok	Bang Kapi	486
Ratchada-Tha Phra Health Centre		General health centre		Bangkok	Thon Buri	25
Rutnin Eye Hospital		Specialised	Ophthalmology	Bangkok	Watthana	12
Saint Louis Hospital		General		Bangkok	Sathon	387
Samitivej Chinatown Hospital	Bangkok Dusit Medical Services	General		Bangkok	Samphanthawong	31
Samitivej Srinakarin Hospital	Bangkok Dusit Medical Services	General		Bangkok	Suan Luang	154
Samitivej Sukhumvit Hospital	Bangkok Dusit Medical Services	General		Bangkok	Watthana	275
Samitivej Thonburi Hospital	Bangkok Dusit Medical Services	General		Bangkok	Thon Buri	150
Serene Hospital		Chronic care centre		Bangkok	Bang Kapi	30
Sikarin Hospital		General		Bangkok	Bang Na	258
Sirinart Buengkum Hospital	Ramkhamhaeng-Vibhavadi-Synphaet-Vibharam Hospitals Group	General		Bangkok	Bueng Kum	52
SLC Hospital		Specialised	Plastic Surgery	Bangkok	Watthana	2
S Spine and Nerve Hospital		Specialised	Spine, Neurology	Bangkok	Wang Thonglang	26
Sukavej Hospital		Chronic care centre		Bangkok	Wang Thonglang	30
Sukhumvit Hospital		General		Bangkok	Wattana	135
Suksawat Hospital		General		Bangkok	Rat Burana	100
SYH Hospital		General		Bangkok	Bang Khen	6
Synphaet Hospital	Ramkhamhaeng-Vibhavadi-Synphaet-Vibharam Hospitals Group	General		Bangkok	Khan Na Yao	287
Synphaet Children's Hospital	Ramkhamhaeng-Vibhavadi-Synphaet-Vibharam Hospitals Group	Pediatric		Bangkok	Khan Na Yao	59
Synphaet Serirak Hospital	Ramkhamhaeng-Vibhavadi-Synphaet-Vibharam Hospitals Group	General		Bangkok	Min Buri	238
Synphaet Srinakarin Hospital	Ramkhamhaeng-Vibhavadi-Synphaet-Vibharam Hospitals Group	General		Bangkok	Min Buri	110
Thai Eye Center Rama 3		Specialised	Ophthalmology	Bangkok	Bang Kho Laem	10
Thainakarin Hospital		General		Bangkok	Bang Na	190
The Senior Health Care		General	Senior Rehabilitation	Bangkok	Chatuchak	89
The Senior Health Care Ratchayothin		Specialised	Senior Rehabilitation	Bangkok	Chatuchak	59
Theptarin Hospital		General		Bangkok	Khlong Toei	80
Thian Fah Foundation Hospital	Thian Fah Foundation	General		Bangkok	Samphanthawong	60
Thonburi Hospital	Thonburi Hospital Group	General		Bangkok	Bangkok Noi	435
Thonburi Bamrungmuang Hospital	Thonburi Hospital Group	General		Bangkok	Pom Prap Sattru Phai	47
Thonburi 2 Hospital	Thonburi Hospital Group	General		Bangkok	Thawi Watthana	95
Vejthani Hospital		General		Bangkok	Bang Kapi	263
Vibharam Hospital	Ramkhamhaeng-Vibhavadi-Synphaet-Vibharam Hospitals Group	General		Bangkok	Suan Luang	150
Vibhavadi Hospital	Ramkhamhaeng-Vibhavadi-Synphaet-Vibharam Hospitals Group	General		Bangkok	Chatuchak	258
Vichaivej International Hospital Nongkhaem	Vichaivej Hospital Group	General		Bangkok	Nong Khaem	172
Vichaivej Yaekfaichai Hospital	Vichaivej Hospital Group	General		Bangkok	Bangkok Noi	49
Vichaiyut Hospital	Vichaiyut Hospital	General		Bangkok	Phaya Thai	207
Vichaiyut Medical Center	Vichaiyut Hospital	General		Bangkok	Phaya Thai	114
Vimut Hospital		General		Bangkok	Phaya Thai	100
W Plastic Surgery Hospital		Specialised	Plastic Surgery	Bangkok	Lat Phrao	4
Wansiri Aesthetic Hospital		Specialised	Plastic Surgery	Bangkok	Bang Kho Laem	29
Wattanosoth Cancer Hospital	Bangkok Dusit Medical Services	Specialised	Oncology	Bangkok	Huai Khwang	49
Wattanosoth Cancer International Hospital	Bangkok Dusit Medical Services	Specialised	Oncology	Bangkok	Huai Khwang	30
WIH International Hospital		Specialised	Surgery	Bangkok	Bang Na	41
Yanhee Hospital		General		Bangkok	Bang Phlat	400
Ang Thong Wetchakan 2 Hospital (Dr. Pracherd)		General		Ang Thong	Mueang	59
Buriram Ram Hospital		General		Buriram	Mueang	90
Rueangroj Kanphaet Hospital		General		Buriram	Nang Rong	19
Chularat 11 Hospital	Chularat Hospital Group	General		Chachoengsao	Bang Pakong	100
Kasemrad Chachoengsao Hospital	Bangkok Chain Hospital PCL	General		Chachoengsao	Mueang	100
Ruampat Chachoengsao Hospital		General		Chachoengsao	Mueang	59
Rhuampath Chainat Hospital		General		Chai Nat	Mueang	59
Chaiyaphum Ram Hospital	Ramkhamhaeng-Vibhavadi-Synphaet-Vibharam Hospitals Group	General		Chaiyaphum	Mueang	60
Chaiyaphum Ruampaet Hospital		General		Chaiyaphum	Mueang	31
Bangkok Hospital Chanthaburi	Bangkok Dusit Medical Services	General		Chanthaburi	Mueang	200
Sirivej Hospital Chanthaburi	Thonburi Hospital Group	General		Chanthaburi	Mueang	90
Bangkok Hospital Chiangmai		General		Chiang Mai	Mueang	153
Central Chiangmai Memorial Hospital		General		Chiang Mai	Mueang	120
Chiangmai Hospital		General		Chiang Mai	Mueang	50
Chiangmai Klaimor Hospital		General		Chiang Mai	Mueang	119
Chiang Mai Medical Center Hospital		General		Chiang Mai	Mueang	100
Chiang Mai Ram Hospital	Ramkhamhaeng-Vibhavadi-Synphaet-Vibharam Hospitals Group	General		Chiang Mai	Mueang	200
Lanna Hospital	Lanna Hospital Group	General		Chiang Mai	Mueang	180
Lanna 2 Hospital	Lanna Hospital Group	General		Chiang Mai	Mueang	30
Lanna 3 Hospital	Lanna Hospital Group	General		Chiang Mai	Mueang	120
McCormick Hospital	Church of Christ in Thailand	General		Chiang Mai	Mueang	400
McKean Senior Center and Hospital	Church of Christ in Thailand	Specialised	Geriatrics	Chiang Mai	Mueang	30
MT Intermed Hospital		General		Chiang Mai	Mueang	10
Rajavej Hospital Chiangmai		General		Chiang Mai	Mueang	150
Saint Peter Eye Hospital		Specialised	Ophthalmology	Chiang Mai	Mueang	9
Theppanya Hospital	Theppanya Hospital Group	General		Chiang Mai	Mueang	109
Theppanya 2 (Changphueak) Hospital	Theppanya Hospital Group	General		Chiang Mai	Mueang	60
The Residence Hospital		Specialised	Drug Rehabilitation	Chiang Mai	Mueang	5
Bangkok Hospital Chiangrai	Bangkok Dusit Medical Services	General		Chiang Rai	Mueang	57
Chiang Rai Inter Hospital		General		Chiang Rai	Mueang	30
Kasemrad Hospital Maesai	Bangkok Chain Hospital PCL	General		Chiang Rai	Mae Sai	30
Kasemrad Hospital Sriburin	Bangkok Chain Hospital PCL	General		Chiang Rai	Mueang	120
Overbrook Hospital	Church of Christ in Thailand	General		Chiang Rai	Mueang	246
Aikchol Hospital	Aikchol Hospital PCL	General		Chonburi	Mueang	210
Aikchol 2 Hospital	Aikchol Hospital PCL	General		Chonburi	Mueang	100
Amatavejchakam Hospital		General		Chonburi	Mueang	7
Bangkok Hospital Pattaya	Bangkok Dusit Medical Services	General		Chonburi	Bang Lamung	300
BMC Plus Hospital	Bang Phra Medical Center	General		Chonburi	Si Racha	3
Chularat Cholvaej Hospital	Chularat Hospital Group	General		Chonburi	Mueang	56
Jomtien Hospital	Bangkok Dusit Medical Services	General		Chonburi	Bang Lamung	60
Vibharam Amatanakorn Hospital	Ramkhamhaeng-Vibhavadi-Synphaet-Vibharam Hospitals Group	General		Chonburi	Mueang	139
Vibharam Laem Chabang Hospital	Ramkhamhaeng-Vibhavadi-Synphaet-Vibharam Hospitals Group	General		Chonburi	Si Racha	100
Pattaya International Hospital		General		Chonburi	Bang Lamung	55
Pattaya Memorial Hospital		General		Chonburi	Bang Lamung	50
Phayathai Siracha Hospital	Phyathai Hospital Group	General		Chonburi	Si Racha	257
Piyavate Hospital Bowin		General		Chonburi	Si Racha	55
Samitivej Chonburi Hospital	Bangkok Dusit Medical Services	General		Chonburi	Mueang	161
Samitivej Sriracha Hospital	Bangkok Dusit Medical Services	General		Chonburi	Si Racha	234
Sriracha Cancer Alliance Hospital		Specialised	Oncology	Chonburi	Si Racha	30
Thonburi Chumphon Hospital	Thonburi Hospital Group	General		Chumphon	Mueang	100
Virajsilp Hospital	Principal Healthcare Company	General		Chumphon	Mueang	100
Kalasin-Thonburi Hospital	Thonburi Hospital Group	General		Kalasin	Mueang	60
Thirawat Hospital		General		Kalasin	Mueang	50
Aikachon Mueangkampang Hospital		General		Kamphaeng Phet	Mueang	50
Phaet Bandit Hospital		General		Kamphaeng Phet	Mueang	10
Christian Hospital of the Sangkhla Buri Christian Center	Church of Christ in Thailand	General		Kanchanaburi	Sangkhla Buri	30
Kwai River Christian Hospital	Church of Christ in Thailand	General		Kanchanaburi	Sangkhla Buri	25
Synphaet Kanchanaburi Hospital	Ramkhamhaeng-Vibhavadi-Synphaet-Vibharam Hospitals Group	General		Kanchanaburi	Mueang	100
Tha Ruea Hospital		General		Kanchanaburi	Tha Maka	29
Thanakan Hospital	Thonburi Hospital Group	General		Kanchanaburi	Mueang	74
Bangkok Hospital Khonkaen	Bangkok Dusit Medical Services	General		Khon Kaen	Mueang	126
Khon Kaen Ram Hospital	Ramkhamhaeng-Vibhavadi-Synphaet-Vibharam Hospitals Group	General		Khon Kaen	Mueang	199
Ratchaphruek Hospital	Thonburi Hospital Group	General		Khon Kaen	Mueang	198
Jariyatham Ruam Phaet Hospital		General		Krabi	Mueang	25
Krabi Nakharin Hospital		General		Krabi	Mueang	100
Wattanapat Hospital Aonang		General		Krabi	Mueang	59
Khelang Nakhon-Ram Hospital	Ramkhamhaeng-Vibhavadi-Synphaet-Vibharam Hospitals Group	General		Lampang	Mueang	103
Van Santvoord Health Centre	Church of Christ in Thailand	General		Lampang	Mueang	29
Hariphunchai Memorial Hospital		General		Lamphun	Mueang	100
Hariphunchai Ram Hospital	Ramkhamhaeng-Vibhavadi-Synphaet-Vibharam Hospitals Group	General		Lamphun	Mueang	179
Lamphun Klaimor Hospital		General		Lamphun	Mueang	49
Sirivej Lamphun Hospital	Principal Healthcare Company	General		Lamphun	Mueang	59
Mueang Loei Ram Hospital	Ramkhamhaeng-Vibhavadi-Synphaet-Vibharam Hospitals Group	General		Loei	Mueang	100
Benjarom Hospital		General		Lopburi	Mueang	30
Mueang Narai Hospital		General		Lopburi	Mueang	57
Mahasarakham International Hospital	Dr. Hann Hospital Group	General		Maha Sarakham	Mueang	50
Mukdahan International Hospital	Dr. Hann Hospital Group	General		Mukdahan	Mueang	60
Bangkok Hospital Sanamchan	Bangkok Dusit Medical Services	General		Nakhon Pathom	Mueang	220
Bangkok Christian Hospital Nakhon Pathom	Church of Christ in Thailand	General		Nakhon Pathom	Mueang	90
Doctor Health International Hospital		Specialised	Physical Therapy	Nakhon Pathom	Sam Phran	1
Inter Kamphaengsaen Hospital		General		Nakhon Pathom	Kamphaeng Saen	30
Putticha Hospital		General		Nakhon Pathom	Mueang	3
Salaya Hospital		General		Nakhon Pathom	Phutthamonthon	32
Thepakorn Hospital	Bangkok Dusit Medical Services	General		Nakhon Pathom	Mueang	100
Bangkok Hospital Ratchasima	Bangkok Dusit Medical Services	General		Nakhon Ratchasima	Mueang	203
Bangkok Hospital Pakchong	Bangkok Dusit Medical Services	General		Nakhon Ratchasima	Pakchong	40
Bua Yai Ruam Phaet Hospital		General		Nakhon Ratchasima	Bua Yai	31
P. Phaet 1 Hospital		General		Nakhon Ratchasima	Mueang	150
P. Phaet 2 Hospital		General		Nakhon Ratchasima	Mueang	132
Ratchasima Hospital		General		Nakhon Ratchasima	Mueang	35
Rim Living Hospital		General		Nakhon Ratchasima	Mueang	32
Saint Mary's Hospital		General		Nakhon Ratchasima	Mueang	150
The Golden Gate Hospital		General		Nakhon Ratchasima	Mueang	60
Princ Paknampo 1 Hospital	Principal Healthcare Company	General		Nakhon Sawan	Mueang	100
Princ Paknampo 2 Hospital	Principal Healthcare Company	General		Nakhon Sawan	Mueang	100
Romchat Hospital		General		Nakhon Sawan	Mueang	100
Ruam Phaet Nakhon Sawan Hospital		General		Nakhon Sawan	Mueang	30
Srisawan Hospital		General		Nakhon Sawan	Mueang	200
Nakharin Hospital		General		Nakhon Si Thammarat	Muang	157
Nakhon Christian Hospital	Thonburi Hospital Group	General		Nakhon Si Thammarat	Muang	50
Nakhonpat Hospital		General		Nakhon Si Thammarat	Mueang	59
Ruamphat Thungsong Hospital		General		Nakhon Si Thammarat	Thung Song	25
Thonburi Thungsong Hospital	Thonburi Hospital Group	General		Nakhon Si Thammarat	Thung Song	50
Rajnara Hospital		General		Narathiwat	Mueang	38
Veerapolkanpat Hospital		General		Nong Bua Lamphu	Mueang	50
Nong Khai Wattana Hospital	Wattana Hospital Group	General		Nong Khai	Mueang	100
Phisaivech Hospital		General		Nong Khai	Phon Phisai	50
Ruamphaet Nongkhai Hospital		General		Nong Khai	Mueang	50
Anan Phatthana 2 Hospital		General		Nonthaburi	Bang Kruai	50
Asia Cosmetic Hospital		Specialised	Plastic Surgery	Nonthaburi	Mueang	6
Chollada Hospital		General		Nonthaburi	Bang Bua Thong	59
Kasemrad Hospital Rattanathibeth	Bangkok Chain Hospital PCL	General		Nonthaburi	Bang Bua Thong	119
Kasemrad International Hospital Rattanathibeth	Bangkok Chain Hospital PCL	General		Nonthaburi	Bang Yai	133
Krungthai Hospital		General		Nonthaburi	Pak Kret	100
Lelux Hospital		Specialised	Plastic Surgery	Nonthaburi	Mueang	30
Mind Med		Specialised	Psychiatry	Nonthaburi	Mueang	18
Mitrmaitri Medical Center		General		Nonthaburi	Pak Kret	11
Nonthavej Hospital		General		Nonthaburi	Mueang	208
Rattanathibet Medical Center		General		Nonthaburi	Mueang	10
Vibharam Pakkret Hospital	Ramkhamhaeng-Vibhavadi-Synphaet-Vibharam Hospitals Group	General		Nonthaburi	Pak Kret	100
World Medical Hospital		General		Nonthaburi	Pak Kret	150
Bangpakok Rangsit 2 Hospital	Bangpakok Hospital Group	General		Pathum Thani	Thanyaburi	100
CGH Lamlukka Hospital	CGH Hospital Group	General		Pathum Thani	Lam Luk Ka	100
Karunvech Hospital	Bangkok Chain Hospital PCL	General		Pathum Thani	Khlong Luang	200
Krung Siam St.Carlos Medical Centre		General		Pathum Thani	Mueang	100
Krungthai Pathum Hospital		General		Pathum Thani	Mueang	30
Pathumvech Hospital		General		Pathum Thani	Thanyaburi	200
Phatara-Thonburi Hospital	Thonburi Hospital Group	General		Pathum Thani	Khlong Luang	120
Paolo Rangsit Hospital	Bangkok Dusit Medical Services	General		Pathum Thani	Thanyaburi	88
PatRangsit Hospital		General		Pathum Thani	Lam Luk Ka	201
PatRangsit 2 Hospital		General		Pathum Thani	Lam Luk Ka	59
SEMed Living Care Hospital		General		Pathum Thani	Thanyaburi	1
Synphaet Lamlukka Hospital		General		Pathum Thani	Lam Luk Ka	100
Thonburi Burana Hospital		Specialised	Geriatrics	Pathum Thani	Khlong Luang	55
Siroros Hospital Pattani		General		Pattani	Mueang	30
Piyarak Hospital		General		Phatthalung	Mueang	30
Phayao Ram Hospital	Ramkhamhaeng-Vibhavadi-Synphaet-Vibharam Hospitals Group	General		Phayao	Mueang	100
Phetcharat Hospital		General		Phetchabun	Mueang	59
Nakornlom Hospital		General		Phetchabun	Lom Sak	10
Bangkok Hospital Phetchaburi	Bangkok Dusit Medical Services	General		Phetchaburi	Mueang	100
Mahachai Petcharat Hospital	Mahachai Hospital Group	General		Phetchaburi	Mueang	100
Chaiaroon Vechagarn Hospital		General		Phichit	Mueang	108
Pitsanuvej Hospital Phichit	Principal Healthcare Company	General		Phichit	Mueang	90
Srisukho Health Centre		General		Phichit	Mueang	10
Thatsanavet Hospital		General		Phichit	Mueang	10
Bangkok Hospital Phitsanulok	Bangkok Dusit Medical Services	General		Phitsanulok	Mueang	100
Phitsanulok Hospital		General		Phitsanulok	Mueang	60
Pitsanuvej Hospital	Principal Healthcare Company	General		Phitsanulok	Mueang	150
Radiotherapy and Nuclear Medicine Hospital		Specialised	Radiology, Nuclear Medicine	Phitsanulok	Mueang	10
Ruamphat Pitsanulok Hospital		General		Phitsanulok	Mueang	100
Phrae Christian Hospital	Church of Christ in Thailand	General		Phrae	Phrae Christian	60
Phrae-Ram Hospital	Ramkhamhaeng-Vibhavadi-Synphaet-Vibharam Hospitals Group	General		Phrae	Phrae-Ram	60
Asia Hospital		General		Phra Nakhon Si Ayutthaya	Uthai	3
Asia International Hospital		General		Phra Nakhon Si Ayutthaya	Bang Pa-in	59
Karunvech Ayutthaya Hospital		General		Phra Nakhon Si Ayutthaya	Bang Pa-in	105
Wellness Care City		Chronic care centre		Phra Nakhon Si Ayutthaya	Bang Sai	5
Peravech Hospital		General		Phra Nakhon Si Ayutthaya	Phra Nakhon Si Ayutthaya	54
Rajthanee Hospital	Thonburi Hospital Group	General		Phra Nakhon Si Ayutthaya	Phra Nakhon Si Ayutthaya	253
Rajthanee Rojana Hospital		General		Phra Nakhon Si Ayutthaya	Bang Pa-in	100
Supamitr Sena Hospital		General		Phra Nakhon Si Ayutthaya	Sena	41
Bangkok Hospital Phuket	Bangkok Dusit Medical Services	General		Phuket	Mueang	200
Dibuk Hospital	Bangkok Dusit Medical Services	General		Phuket	Mueang	71
Mission Hospital Phuket	Seventh-day Adventist Christian Foundation of Thailand	General		Phuket	Mueang	50
Bangkok Siriroj Hospital (Phuket International Hospital)	Bangkok Dusit Medical Services	General		Phuket	Mueang	151
Chularat 304 International Hospital		General		Prachinburi	Si Maha Phot	59
Kasemrad Prachinburi Hospital	Bangkok Chain Hospital PCL	General		Prachinburi	Si Maha Phot	115
Bangkok Hospital Huahin	Bangkok Dusit Medical Services	General		Prachuap Khiri Khan	Hua Hin	60
San Paulo Hua-Hin Hospital		General		Prachuap Khiri Khan	Hua Hin	56
Andaman Ranong Medical Centre		General		Ranong	Mueang	5
Dr. Pradit Hospital		General		Ratchaburi	Mueang	10
Dr. Sanguan Hospital		General		Ratchaburi	Damnoen Saduak	10
Muangraj Hospital	Bangkok Dusit Medical Services	General		Ratchaburi	Mueang	100
Mahachai Promphat Hospital	Mahachai Hospital Group	General		Ratchaburi	Mueang	59
San Camillo Hospital	St. Camillus Foundation of Thailand	General		Ratchaburi	Ban Pong	100
Wattanavej Hospital		General		Ratchaburi	Ban Pong	30
Bangkok Hospital Rayong	Bangkok Dusit Medical Services	General		Rayong	Mueang	160
Chularat Rayong Hospital		General		Rayong	Mueang	50
Mongkutrayong Hospital		General		Rayong	Mueang	100
Piyawetch Rayong Hospital		General		Rayong	Pluak Daeng	30
Sri Rayong Hospital		General		Rayong	Mueang	55
Chureevetch Hospital		General		Roi Et	Mueang	92
Roi-Et Thonburi Hospital	Thonburi Hospital Group	General		Roi Et	Mueang	100
Rak Sakon Hospital		General		Sakon Nakhon	Mueang	25
Bangkok Hospital Phrapradaeng	Bangkok Dusit Medical Services	General		Samut Prakan	Phra Pradaeng	60
Bangna General Hospital 2	Bangna General Hospital	General		Samut Prakan	Bang Sao Thong	100
Bangna General Hospital 5	Bangna General Hospital	General		Samut Prakan	Bang Phli	100
Bangpakok Samutprakan Hospital	Bangpakok Hospital Group	General		Samut Prakan	Phra Pradaeng	59
Bangpakok 3 Hospital	Bangpakok Hospital Group	General		Samut Prakan	Phra Pradaeng	200
Central Park Hospital		General		Samut Prakan	Bang Phli	120
CHG Hospital		Specialised	Geriatrics	Samut Prakan	Bang Phli	59
Chularat Thepharak Hospital	Chularat Hospital Group	General		Samut Prakan	Bang Phli	44
Chularat 1 Suvanabhumi Hospital	Chularat Hospital Group	General		Samut Prakan	Bang Phli	26
Chularat 3 International Hospital	Chularat Hospital Group	General		Samut Prakan	Bang Phli	134
Chularat 5 Hospital	Chularat Hospital Group	General		Samut Prakan	Bang Sao Thong	26
Chularat 9 Hospital	Chularat Hospital Group	General		Samut Prakan	Bang Phli	100
Mueang Samut Pak Nam Hospital	Mueang Samut Hospital Group	General		Samut Prakan	Mueang	148
Mueang Samut Pu Chao Hospital	Mueang Samut Hospital Group	General		Samut Prakan	Phra Pradaeng	140
Paolo Memorial Hospital Samutprakarn	Bangkok Dusit Medical Services	General		Samut Prakan	Mueang	200
Paolo Memorial Hospital Phrapradaeng	Bangkok Dusit Medical Services	General		Samut Prakan	Phra Pradaeng	60
Princ Suvarnabhumi Hospital	Principal Healthcare Company	General		Samut Prakan	Bang Phli	200
Ruamchai Pracharak Hospital		General		Samut Prakan	Bang Bo	100
Samrong General Hospital		General		Samut Prakan	Mueang	250
Sikarin Samutprakan Hospital		General		Samut Prakan	Mueang	100
Synphaet Theparak Hospital	Ramkhamhaeng-Vibhavadi-Synphaet-Vibharam Hospitals Group	General		Samut Prakan	Bang Phli	120
The C Plus Hospital		General		Samut Prakan	Mueang	30
Vibharam Chaiprakarn Hospital	Ramkhamhaeng-Vibhavadi-Synphaet-Vibharam Hospitals Group	General		Samut Prakan	Phra Pradaeng	101
Ekachai Hospital		General		Samut Sakhon	Mueang	142
Jesada Vechakarn Hospital		General		Samut Sakhon	Mueang	10
Mahachai 2 Hospital	Mahachai Hospital Group	General		Samut Sakhon	Krathum Baen	200
Mahachai 3 Hospital	Mahachai Hospital Group	General		Samut Sakhon	Mueang	100
Mahachai Hospital	Mahachai Hospital Group	General		Samut Sakhon	Mueang	180
Panacee Hospital Rama 2		General		Samut Sakhon	Mueang	11
Vichaivej International Hospital Omnoi	Vichaivej Hospital Group	General		Samut Sakhon	Krathum Baen	196
Vichaivej International Hospital Samut Sakhon	Vichaivej Hospital Group	General		Samut Sakhon	Mueang	120
Vibharam Samut Sakhon Hospital	Ramkhamhaeng-Vibhavadi-Synphaet-Vibharam Hospitals Group	General		Samut Sakhon	Mueang	100
W Medical Hospital		General		Samut Sakhon	Mueang	5
Mahachai Maeklong Hospital	Mahachai Hospital Group	General		Samut Songkhram	Mueang	60
Apinop Health Center		General		Saraburi	Kaeng Khoi	10
Kasemrad Hospital Saraburi	Bangkok Chain Hospital PCL	General		Saraburi	Mueang	200
Mittraphap Memorial Hospital Saraburi		General		Saraburi	Mueang	250
Pabhavej Hospital		General		Saraburi	Nong Khae	50
Singburi Vechakarn Hospital		General		Singburi	Mueang	30
Pracharak Wetchakarn Hospital		General		Sisaket	Mueang	44
Princ Sisaket Hospital	Principal Healthcare Company	General		Sisaket	Mueang	59
Bangkok Hospital Hat Yai	Bangkok Dusit Medical Services	General		Songkhla	Hat Yai	180
Rajyindee Hospital		General		Songkhla	Hat Yai	196
Sikarin Hatyai Hospital		General		Songkhla	Hat Yai	200
Tong Sia Siang Teung Foundation Hospital	Tong Sia Siang Teung Foundation	General		Songkhla	Hat Yai	56
Dr. Akhom Nursing Home		General		Sukhothai	Mueang	23
Patanavej Sukothai Hospital		General		Sukhothai	Mueang	25
Ruamphaet Sukhothai Hospital		General		Sukhothai	Mueang	60
Pornchai Hospital		General		Suphan Buri	Mueang	59
Supamitr General Hospital		General		Suphan Buri	Mueang	179
Thonburi U Thong Hospital	Thonburi Hospital Group	General		Suphan Buri	U Thong	30
Vibhavadi Piyarasd Hospital	Ramkhamhaeng-Vibhavadi-Synphaet-Vibharam Hospitals Group	General		Suphan Buri	U Thong	60
Ban Don Inter Hospital		General		Surat Thani	Ko Samui	32
Ban Don International Hospital Chaweng		General		Surat Thani	Ko Samui	9
Ban Don International Hospital Ko Phangan		General		Surat Thani	Ko Pha-ngan	9
Bangkok Hospital Samui	Bangkok Dusit Medical Services	General		Surat Thani	Ko Samui	50
Bangkok Hospital Suratthani	Bangkok Dusit Medical Services	General		Surat Thani	Mueang	59
First Western Hospital		General		Surat Thani	Ko Pha-ngan	32
Phangan International Hospital	Bangkok Dusit Medical Services	General		Surat Thani	Ko Pha-ngan	3
Samui International Hospital		General		Surat Thani	Ko Samui	26
Srivichai Suratthani Hospital		General		Surat Thani	Mueang	30
Surat Thani Eye Hospital		Specialised	Ophthalmology	Surat Thani	Mueang	30
Thai International Hospital		General		Surat Thani	Ko Samui	28
Thaksin Hospital		General		Surat Thani	Mueang	200
Viengvej Hospital		General		Surat Thani	Wiang Sa	10
Ruampaet Hospital (Dr. Anan)		General		Surin	Mueang	210
Surin Ruam Phaet Hospital		General		Surin	Mueang	60
Maesot Ram Hospital		General		Tak	Mae Sot	100
Nakorn Maesot International Hospital		General		Tak	Mae Sot	109
TRPH Hospital	Thonburi Hospital Group	General		Trang	Mueang	150
Wattanapat Hospital		General		Trang	Mueang	120
Bangkok Hospital Trat	Bangkok Dusit Medical Services	General		Trat	Mueang	100
International Clinic Koh Chang	Bangkok Dusit Medical Services	General		Trat	Ko Chang	3
Chiwamitra Hospital		Specialised	Oncology	Ubon Ratchathani	Mueang	3
Ekkachon Roamklao Hospital		General		Ubon Ratchathani	Mueang	50
Niran Hospital		General		Ubon Ratchathani	Mueang	2
Princ Hospital Ubon Ratchathani		General		Ubon Ratchathani	Mueang	59
Rajavej Hospital		General		Ubon Ratchathani	Mueang	100
Ubonrak Thonburi Hospital	Thonburi Hospital Group	General		Ubon Ratchathani	Mueang	100
Bangkok Hospital Udon		General		Udon Thani	Mueang	100
Aek Udon International Hospital		General		Udon Thani	Chai-Kasem	100
Chai-Kasem Hospital		General		Udon Thani	Mueang	10
North Eastern Wattana Hospital	Wattana Hospital Group	General		Udon Thani	Mueang	100
Princ Uthai Thani Hospital	Principal Healthcare Company	General		Uthai Thani	Mueang	59
Pitsanuvej Uttaradit Hospital	Principal Healthcare Company	General		Uttaradit	Mueang	57
Siroros Hospital		General		Yala	Mueang	60
Dr. Hann Hospital	Dr. Hann Hospital Group	General		Yasothon	Mueang	50
Ruamphaet Yasothon Hospital	Dr. Hann Hospital Group	General		Yasothon	Mueang	60

== See also ==
- Health in Thailand
- Hospitals in Thailand
