= Naradhiwas Rajanagarindra Hospital =

Naradhiwas Rajanagarindra Hospital โรงพยาบาลนราธิวาสราชนครินทร์
- The Ministry of Public Health Health District 12

Geography
- Location: 180 Ra-ngae Mankha Road, Bang Nak Subdistrict, Mueang Narathiwat District, Narathiwat 96000, Thailand
- Coordinates: 6.414642°N 101.823644°E

Organisation
- Type: General
- Affiliated university: Faculty of Medicine, Princess of Naradhiwas University

Services
- Beds: 407

History
- Former name: Narathiwat Hospital
- Opened: 24 June 1941

Links
- Website: www.narahos.com/index.php
- Lists: Hospitals in Thailand

Naradhiwas Rajanagarindra Hospital (Thai: โรงพยาบาลนราธิวาสราชนครินทร์) is the main hospital of Narathiwat Province, Thailand and is classified under the Ministry of Public Health as a general hospital. It has a CPIRD Medical Education Center which trains doctors for the Faculty of Medicine of Princess of Naradhiwas University.

== History ==
Mom Rajawongse Taweewong Thawansak, then governor of Narathiwat Province, saw that Narathiwat being a province in the far south of Thailand, did not receive satisfactory healthcare as other provinces in the country. He cooperated with Luang Charoon Burakij, his successor as governor in building a two-storey building named "Taweecharoon" which acted as a health station and opened on 24 June 1941, with two full-time doctors working. Over time, the health station was expanded in 1952 and became a hospital, named Narathiwat Hospital and its first hospital director was Dr. Sem Pringpuangkaeo, former director of the Women's Hospital (now Rajavithi Hospital). Under the National Social and Economic Development Plan, the hospital became classified as a general hospital. On 28 February 1997, the hospital was renamed "Naradhiwas Rajanagarindra Hospital" (Princess of Naradhiwas Hospital), after King Bhumibol Adulyadej bestowed the royal title of the Princess of Naradhiwas to his majesty's sister, Princess Galyani Vadhana in 1995.

== See also ==
- Healthcare in Thailand
- Hospitals in Thailand
- List of hospitals in Thailand
