= Yala Hospital =

Yala Hospital โรงพยาบาลยะลา
- The Ministry of Public Health Health District 12

Geography
- Location: 152 Siroros Road, Sateng Subdistrict, Mueang Yala District, Yala 95000, Thailand

Organisation
- Type: Regional
- Affiliated university: Faculty of Medicine, Prince of Songkla University; Faculty of Medicine, Princess of Naradhiwas University

Services
- Beds: 513

History
- Former name: Yala Health Station
- Founded: 1 January 1949

Links
- Website: Yala Hospital website
- Lists: Hospitals in Thailand

Yala Hospital (Thai: โรงพยาบาลยะลา) is the main hospital of Yala Province, Thailand. It is classified under the Ministry of Public Health as a regional hospital. It has a CPIRD Medical Education Center which trains doctors for the Faculty of Medicine, Prince of Songkla University. It is also an affiliated teaching hospital of the Faculty of Medicine, Princess of Naradhiwas University.

== History ==
In 1942, following the establishment of the Ministry of Public Health, the policy of constructing hospitals in all provinces was initiated. Towards the end of 1948, Yala Health Station was elevated to hospital status as Yala Hospital, with its official opening on 1 January 1949. It reached regional hospital status on 15 July 1987. The hospital has an agreement to train medical students and act as a clinical teaching hospital with the Faculty of Medicine, Prince of Songkla University under the Collaborative Project to Increase Production of Rural Doctors (CPIRD) program.

Yala Hospital is the largest tertiary care referral hospital for injuries from the South Thailand insurgency within the three provinces of Pattani, Yala and Narathiwat where the conflict is most concentrated.

== See also ==
- Healthcare in Thailand
- Hospitals in Thailand
- List of hospitals in Thailand
