= Ban Pong Hospital =

Hospital in Ban Pong District, Ratchaburi Province, Thailand

Ban Pong Hospital โรงพยาบาลบ้านโป่ง
- The Ministry of Public Health Health District 5

Geography
- Location: 12 Saengchuto Road, Ban Pong Subdistrict, Ban Pong district, Ratchaburi 70110, Thailand
- Coordinates: 13.8172°N 99.8709°E

Organisation
- Type: General
- Affiliated university: Faculty of Medicine Siriraj Hospital, Mahidol University

Services
- Beds: 420

History
- Opened: December 10, 1932

Links
- Website: www.bph.moph.go.th
- Lists: Hospitals in Thailand

Ban Pong Hospital Ban Pong Hospital is a general hospital in Ban Pong District Ratchaburi Province Thailand with 420 beds[1] under the Ministry of Public Health. It provides both inpatient and outpatient services. It is located in Ban Pong Municipality. It has the same status as a provincial hospital. It is the second largest district hospital in the country after Hat Yai Hospital.

== History ==
The local government of Ban Pong Subdistrict announced the establishment of a sanitary district since November 15, 1916, based on the Ratanakosin Sanitary Management Act, B.E. 2459, Section 2. Later, the Municipality Act was announced on December 10, 1935. Ban Pong Municipality established the Ban Pong Municipal Health Hall around B.E. 2479. The official was Major Luang Wetchasit Niphop, the first municipal doctor. Until B.E. 2496, all health hall operations were transferred to the Medical Committee of the Ministry of Public Health. Later, it was transferred to the Office of the Permanent Secretary of the Ministry of Public Health until today. Currently, Ban Pong Hospital has 420 beds, 40 doctors, 8 dentists, 23 pharmacists, 295 professional nurses, and other personnel. In 2012, there were an average of 1,500 people receiving services per day.

[2][3]

== See also ==
- Healthcare in Thailand
- Hospitals in Thailand
- List of hospitals in Thailand
