= Faculty of Medicine, Princess of Naradhiwas University =

Medical school in Narathiwat, Thailand

Coordinates: 6°27′16.8″N 101°47′20.7″E

- คณะแพทยศาสตร์ มหาวิทยาลัยนราธิวาสราชนครินทร์
- “For A Better Future and A Better Community”
- Type: Public
- Established: 22 July 2005
- Parent institution: Princess of Naradhiwas University
- Dean: Asst. Prof. Dr. Supat Srisawat, Ph.D.
- Location: Narathiwat, Thailand
- Campus: Urban
- Colors: Turquoise
- Website: http://med.pnu.ac.th/

The Faculty of Medicine, Princess of Naradhiwas University (Thai: คณะแพทยศาสตร์ มหาวิทยาลัยนราธิวาสราชนครินทร์) is a medical school located in Narathiwat, southern Thailand. The 19th medical school established in Thailand, founded in 2005, the Medical School is run in collaboration with Songkhla Hospital, Naradhiwas Rajanagarindra Hospital and Galyanivadhanakarun Hospital.

== History ==
Thailand currently has a problem related to health of population and more importantly, a problem of insufficient doctors in terms of quantity and distribution especially in provincial part. Population at the end of 2002 was at 62,779,872 accounted for a proportion at 1 : 2,745. Moreover, majority of doctors concentrates in big city and Bangkok therefore provincial part and the three southern border provinces of Thailand including Yala, Pattani, and Narathiwat has the lowest density of doctor.

In 2005, in supporting a government policy in improving health care in the three southern border provinces, Princess of Naradhiwas University established faculty of medicine admitting students directly of the three southern border provinces including Yala, Pattani, and Narathiwat in order to solve an ongoing severe problem, insufficient numbers of doctors as well as innovate a distribution of education. Supporting a potential student to study in college conforms with government security policy in a strategy used in solving a conflict crisis in the three southern border provinces. This brings about alleviation in conflict and violence and peaceful living together under very culture and lifestyle.

In 2007, the first-year medical students total 16 people.

Due to the fact that Princess of Naradhiwas University is relatively new, it still confronts with the problem of location, instructional equipment and human resources. Thus executives agrees up on the first three year of MD program, medical student will be studying preclinic (1st-3rd year) at Faculty of Science and Faculty of Medicine, Prince of Songkla University, Hat Yai campus. and the developments of those elements are expected to prompt for self operation in the near future.

== Programs of study ==
Doctor of Medicine (MD)

- In year 1 of the 6-year study, the medical students study the general education courses with other students of the university.
- In Year 2-3, the medical students study the pre-clinical level courses managed by Faculty of Medicine.
- In Year 4-6 or clinical years, the academic instructions are managed primarily by the Medical Education Center, Songkhla Hospital, Songkhla, Thailand or Medical Education Center, Naradhiwas Rajanagarindra Hospital, Narathiwat, Thailand

== International cooperations ==
Memoranda of understanding (MOU)

- College of Medicine, University of Illinois at Chicago (UIC) (United States)
- Faculty of Medicine, Alexandria University (Egypt)

== Teaching Hospitals ==
- Galyanivadhanakarun Hospital, Narathiwat
- Songkhla Hospital, Songkhla
- Naradhiwas Rajanagarindra Hospital, Narathiwat

== Affiliated Hospitals ==
- Pattani Hospital, Pattani
- Yala Hospital, Yala
- Su-ngai Kolok Hospital, Narathiwat
