= Attachai Anantameak =

Thai actor and political activist

- อรรถชัย อนันตเมฆ
- Born: 22 April 1965 (age 61); Narathiwat, Thailand
- Occupations: Actor; political activist
- Years active: 1987–2011

Attachai Anantameak (Thai: อรรถชัย อนันตเมฆ; born April 22, 1965, in Narathiwat) is a Thai actor and political activist and a member of the United Front for Democracy Against Dictatorship (UDD).

== Political career ==
Attachai's acting career came to an abrupt halt following his appearance on a UDD stage. He has stated he won't re-enter the entertainment industry as long as patronage networks continue to dominate it at the expense of "truly talented" actors like himself.

Attachai became attached to the Prime Minister Yingluck Shinawatra's secretariat. He has nevertheless criticised the Pheu Thai government for its indulging the military, which he believes need to be offset by a separate service akin to the US National Guards.

In addition to lambasting the Thai "capitalist class" for its parasitic nature, Attachai has also expressed anti-American opinions, which ranged from his assertion that the CIA helped instigate the Thammasat University massacre by following its own example in staging the 1973 Chilean coup d'etat to his belief that Greece's recent economic crisis was caused by the IMF.

== In exile ==
Because of the 2014 Thai coup d'état Attachai went exile in Denmark. He went to Cambodia in exile around 2017 - 2018.
