= Vibhavadi Hospital =

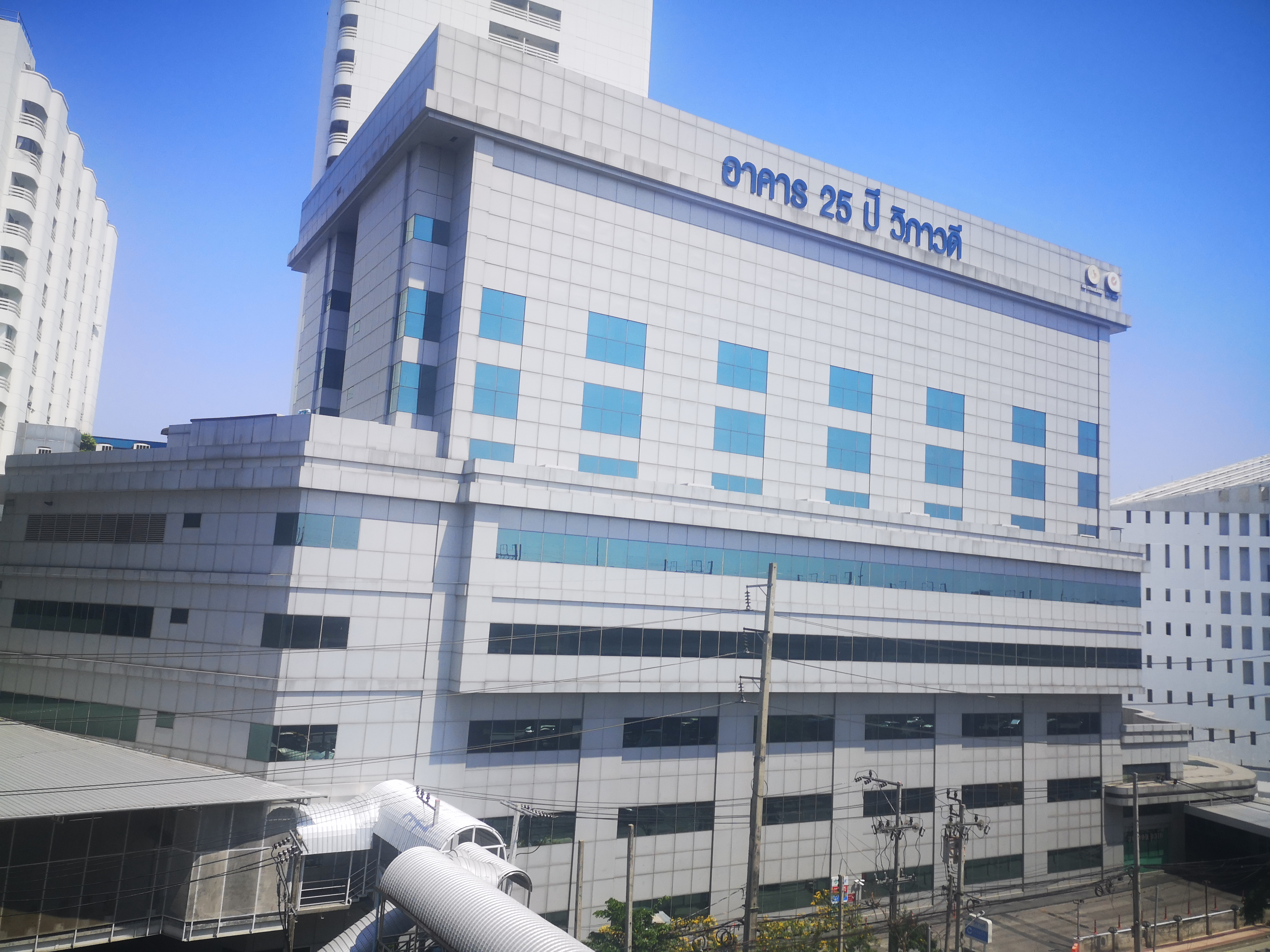

Geography
- Location: Chatuchak, Bangkok, Thailand
- Coordinates: 13°50′46″N 100°33′44″E

Organisation
- Care system: Private

Services
- Emergency department: Yes
- Beds: 350

History
- Opened: March 1, 1986

Links
- Website: http://www.vibhavadi.com
- Lists: Hospitals in Thailand

Vibhavadi Hospital (SET: VIBHA) is a hospital located on Vibhavadi Rangsit Road in Chatuchak District in Bangkok, Thailand. The hospital has 350 beds to accommodate patients, there are more than 70 examination rooms which provide services to some 2,000 outpatients. They have a medical center which offer more than 50 full-time physicians, 250 consulting physicians and important medical equipment.

== History ==
The company was established on 1 March 1986. On 26 March 1989, VIBHA was listed on the Stock Exchange of Thailand.
