= Manarom Hospital =

Geography
- Location: Bangkok, Thailand
- Coordinates: 13.746325°N 100.552635°E

Organisation
- Care system: Private
- Type: The Private Hospital of Mental and Behavioral Healthcare
- Affiliated university: None

History
- Opened: 1 October 2006

Links
- Website: https://www.manarom.com Manarom Hospital
- Lists: Hospitals in Thailand

Manarom Hospital is a private hospital for mental and behavioral healthcare in Bangkok, Thailand. It provides comprehensive mental health services to patients of all ages from children, adults to elderly. The word "Manarom" is pronounced like "ma-na-rhom" and means "Happy Mind".

== History ==
Manarom Hospital was founded in 2004 by the Psychiatric Associates Corporation or PAC (Siam) Co.Ltd with investment of three hundred million baht. The hospital opened on 1 October 2006.

== Services ==
Manarom Hospital offers outpatient evaluation and treatments for mental health problems. Treatment modalities include counseling, psychopharmacotherapy, psychotherapy, group therapy, relaxation, and anger management training.

The hospital offers a 32-bed inpatient facility in a secure environment. It focuses on milieu therapy using a multidisciplinary approach.

Manarom Hospital has a day program for partial hospitalization for behavioral symptom management, medication monitoring, and rehabilitation.

Other services include:

- Child and Adolescent Psychiatry and Family Treatment Center
- Geriatric & Neuropsychiatry Services
- Chemical Dependency Treatment Program
- Sleep Disorder Clinic
- Mental Health Education and Services - promotes mental health issues and psychoeducation to the public schools and organizations.
- Manarom Development Center - trains the public and corporations in personality development

== See also ==
- List of hospitals in Thailand
- List of hospitals in Bangkok
