= Kusuman Hospital =

Kusuman Hospital โรงพยาบาลกุสุมาลย์
- The Ministry of Public Health

Geography
- Location: 106 Nittayo Road, Na Pho Subdistrict, Kusuman District, Sakon Nakhon 47210, Thailand

Organisation
- Type: Community Hospital (F2 level)

Services
- Beds: 60

History
- Founded: 26 August 1983

Links
- Website: Facebook Kusuman Hospital
- Lists: Hospitals in Thailand

Kusuman Hospital (Thai: โรงพยาบาลกุสุมาลย์) is the main hospital of Kusuman District, Sakon Nakhon Province, Thailand and is classified under the regional health 8 (R8WAY), Ministry of Public Health as a community hospital (F2 level) with a capacity of 60 beds

== History ==
Kusuman Hospital was first constructed in 1983 as one building with a capacity of 10 beds. It was officially opened on 26 August 1983. In 1988 (5 years ago), the hospital became classified as a community hospital (F2 level) and expanded to 30 beds. In 1997, the number of beds expanded to 60 and Now the hospital with a capacity of 60 beds

== Location ==
Kusuman Hospital located in Na Pho Sub-district, Kusuman District, Sakon Nakhon Province, about 4 km (2.5 mi) away from the Kusuman government center and about 37 km (23 mi) away from Sakon Nakhon Province.

== Vision (2023-2027) ==
To be one of the leading hospitals of R8WAY (Health Region 8th) with great health service system under the strong health partnership network.

== Mission ==
- To develop a health partner network system to promote health in accordance with community ways of life.
- To provide holistic health services and develop an excellent medical system.
- To build morale and encouragement for personnel at all levels.
- To manage the organization based on the principles of good governance.

== Core Value ==
- K - Knowledge (To be a learning organization that continuously develops its quality.)
- S - Service Mind (To provide excellent, heartfelt, and readily available service that meets the highest standards.)
- M - Morality (To operate with integrity, listen to feedback, emphasize responsibility, and ensure accountability.)

== Organizational Structure and Administration ==
Kusuman Hospital has updated its organizational framework, structuring its administration into 14 primary groups. This reorganization aims to enhance efficiency and streamline services across the hospital.

- General Administration Department
- Medical Technology Department
- Dentistry Department
- Pharmacy and Consumer Protection Department
- Medical Department
- Nutrition Department
- Radiology Department
- Rehabilitation Medicine Department
- Health Insurance and Strategy Department
- Primary and Holistic Care Services Department
- Nursing Department
  - Out-Patient Department
  - Emergency, Accident, and Forensic Department
  - In-Patient Department
  - Infection Control and Central Supply Unit Department
  - Labor and Delivery Department
- Traditional Thai and Alternative Medicine Department
- Psychiatry and Substance Abuse Department
- Digital Health Department

== Management System ==
Kusuman Hospital employs a participative management approach, with the Hospital Executive Committee responsible for setting policies and the overall operational direction. The executive committee convenes monthly to guide these efforts.

For ongoing quality improvement, the hospital utilizes the PDCA (Plan-Do-Check-Act) process. This systematic cycle is a tool for continuous enhancement of healthcare services and problem-solving. In addition, various specialized committees are in place to drive quality development in specific areas. These include the Clinical Leadership Team, the Risk Management Team, and the Infection Control and Prevention Team.

== Services ==
Kusuman Hospital offers a wide range of medical services across various departments. These include:

- Outpatient Department (OPD): For patients who do not require overnight admission.
- Inpatient Department (IPD): For patients who require admission to the hospital for treatment.
- Accident & Emergency Department (ER): For immediate medical attention for injuries and urgent medical conditions.
- Dental Department
- Pharmacy Department
- Thai Traditional and Alternative Medicine Department
- Rehabilitation Department: Provides services such as physical therapy.
- Chronic Disease Clinic (NCD): Specializing in conditions such as diabetes and high blood pressure.
- Antenatal and Family Planning Clinic
- Well Baby Clinic
- Radiology Department
- Health Promotion and Disease Prevention Unit

== Hospital's Expertise and Strengths ==
- Holistic, multidisciplinary team-based care for patients with chronic diseases, with community involvement.
- Development of emergency care and patient referral systems.
- Integration of Thai traditional medicine with modern medical practices.
- Systematic home visitation and community-based healthcare.

== Medical Personnel ==
In 2026, Kusuman Hospital has a total of 178 personnel, comprising:

- 6 Doctors (1:7,922 ratio to population)
- 4 Dentists (1:11,882 ratio to population)
- 5 Pharmacists (1:9,506 ratio to population)
- 37 Professional Nurses (1:1,285 ratio to population)
- 126 Other support staff

== Personnel Expertise ==
- Family Medicine Physicians: Specialists in providing holistic patient care.
- Nursing Team: Possesses expertise in caring for patients with specific diseases such as diabetes, kidney disease, and psychiatric conditions.
- Pharmacy Team: Experts in pharmaceutical care and consumer protection.
- Dental Team: Specializes in community-based preventive and restorative dental care.
- Thai Traditional Medicine Team: Specialists in massage and the use of herbal medicine.

== Personnel Competency Development ==
- Training to develop specialized knowledge and skills. This involves providing targeted educational programs to enhance employees' expertise in specific areas.
- Knowledge Management (KM) and organizational knowledge sharing. This refers to the systematic process of creating, sharing, using, and managing the knowledge and information of an organization. It includes both explicit knowledge, which is easily documented, and tacit knowledge, which is gained through experience.
- Mentoring and Coaching. This involves experienced employees guiding and supporting less experienced colleagues. Mentoring often focuses on long-term career development, while coaching is typically more task-oriented.
- Sending personnel for further education in needed fields. This addresses skill gaps within the organization by supporting employees in obtaining advanced degrees or certifications in areas of high demand.
- Supporting research and innovation within the organization. This encourages a culture of continuous improvement and the development of new ideas, products, and processes.

== Statistics and Performance ==
Number of patients served (Year 2025)

- Outpatient (OPD): 93,304 visits (Average 256 visits/day).
- Inpatient (IPD): 4,446 cases.
- Average Bed Occupancy Rate: 66.9%.
- Average Length of Stay: 3.3 days/case.

== Accreditations and Standards Received ==
- Hospital Accreditation (HA), Standard Level: 3rd renewal from The Healthcare Accreditation Institute (Public Organization).
- Laboratory Accreditation (LA): 2nd renewal from the Department of Medical Sciences.
- Health Service System Standard: from the Department of Health Service Support.
- Integrity and Transparency Assessment (ITA): Excellent Level, recognized as a "Moral Hospital."

== Quality and Safety Policy ==
- 2P Safety (Patient and Personnel Safety) Policy.
- Proactive Risk Management Policy.
- Infection Prevention and Control Policy.
- Rational Drug Use Policy.
- Holistic Patient Care Policy.
- Policy on Respect for Patient Rights and Human Dignity.

== Contact Information ==
- Telephone: (+66)42-769-023, (+66)42-769-041
- Emergency: 1669

== See also ==
- Health in Thailand
- Hospitals in Thailand
- List of hospitals in Thailand
