= Princess of Naradhiwas University =

University in Thailand

- มหาวิทยาลัยนราธิวาสราชนครินทร์
- Motto: The Great Realms of Education
- Type: Public
- Established: February 9, 2005
- President: Asst. Prof. Chongrak Palasai, Ph.D.
- Royal conferrer: Maha Chakri Sirindhorn, Princess Royal of Thailand on behalf of the King
- Location: Narathiwat, Thailand; 6°25′00″N 101°49′27″E
- Colours: Gold and sea blue
- Nickname: PNU
- Website: http://www.pnu.ac.th

Princess of Naradhiwas University (Thai: มหาวิทยาลัยนราธิวาสราชนครินทร์; RTGS: Mahawitthayalai Narathiwat Ratchanakharin; PNU) is a government sponsored university in Narathiwat, southern Thailand. It was founded under the act on 9 February 2005 by merging all educational institutions in the province. Those institutions are Narathiwat Technical College, Narathiwat Agricultural & Technology College, Takbai Vocational College, and Boromarjonani College of Nursing, Narathiwat.

The name of the university was granted by King Bhumibol Adulyadej in honor of his sister Princess Galyani Vadhana, Princess of Naradhiwas. The university also runs an academic journal.

== Academic divisions ==
The university has 7 faculties

- Faculty of Agriculture
- Faculty of Engineering
- Faculty of Liberal Arts
- Faculty of Management Science
- Faculty of Medicine
- Faculty of Nursing
- Faculty of Science and Technology

Colleges and institutes organized by PNU

- Narathiwat Technical College
- Narathiwat Agricultural & Technology College
- Takbai Vocational College
- Institute of Islamic and Arabic Studies

== International cooperations ==
Memoranda of understanding (MOU)

- University of Baguio (Philippines)
- Kunming University (China)
- Gate Stage University (Philippines)
- University of Illinois at Chicago (UIC) (United States)
- Al-Azhar University (Egypt)
- Group T-International University (Belgium)
- Alexandria University (Egypt)
- Universiti Utara Malaysia (UUM)
- Jenderal Soedirman University (Indonesia)

== Address ==
49, Rangaemaraka Rd. Bang Nak, Mueang Narathiwat, Narathiwat 96000, Thailand
