= Hospitals in Thailand =

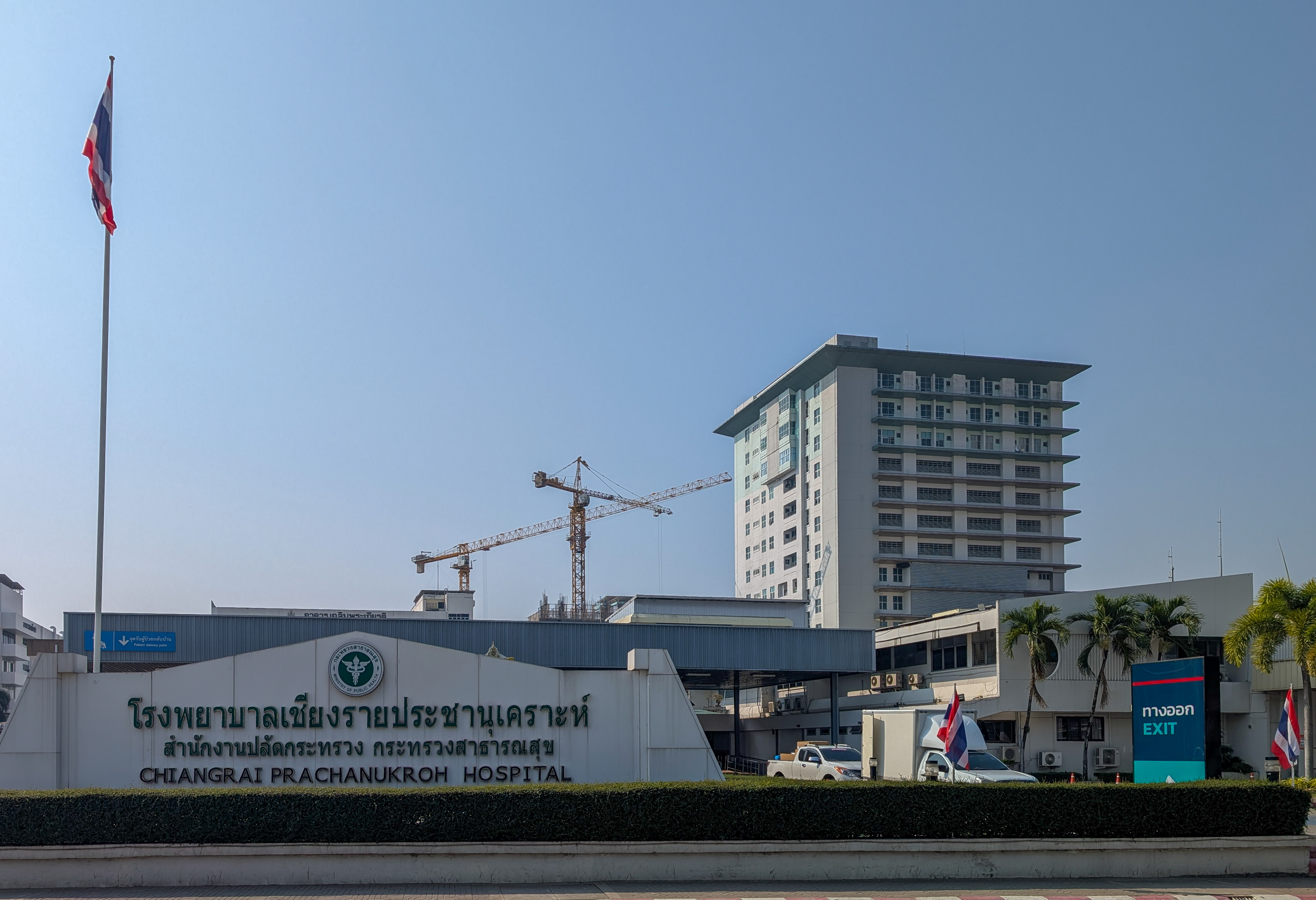
Chiangrai Prachanukroh Hospital, a regional hospital in Chiang Rai

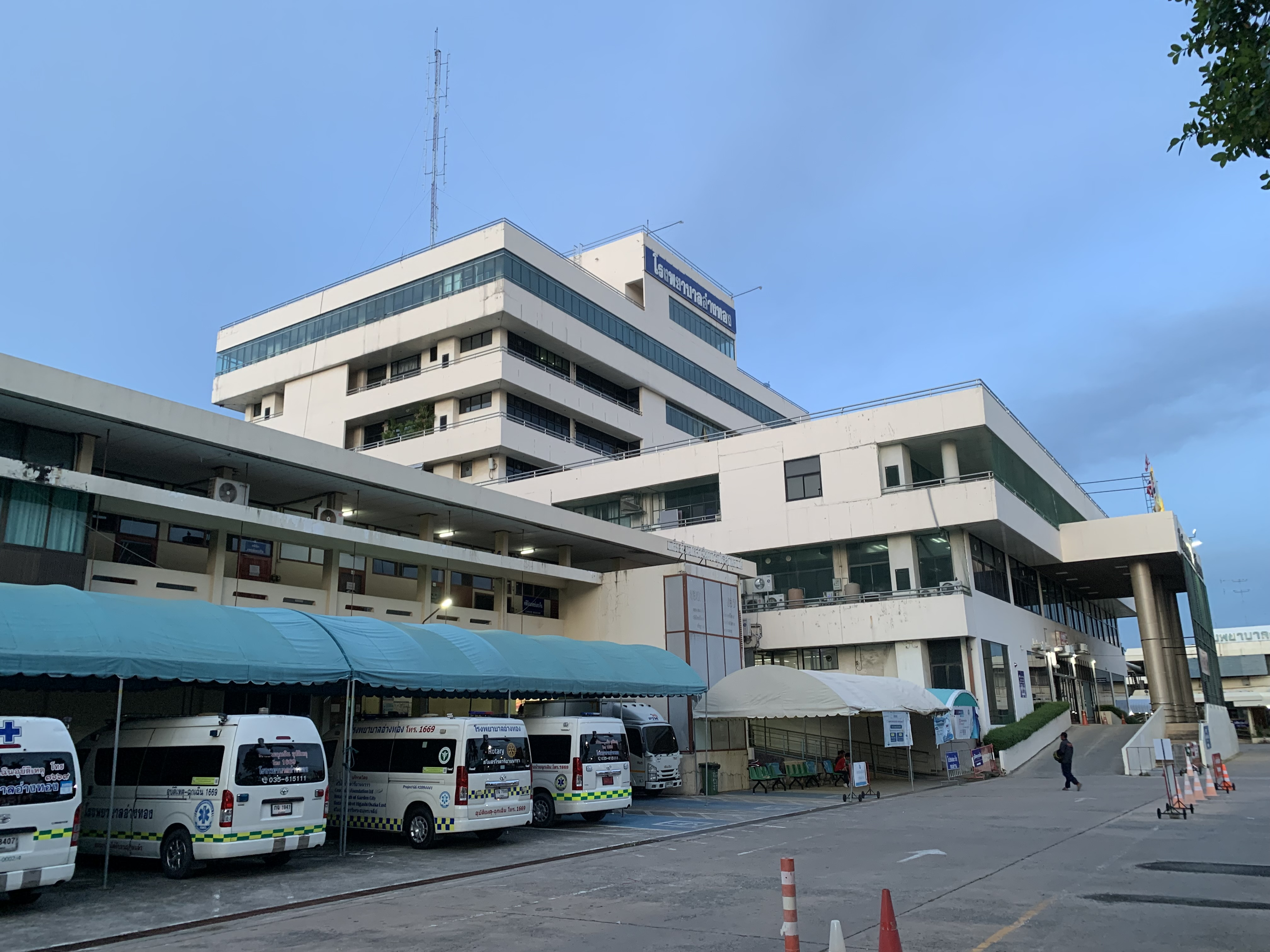
Ang Thong Hospital, a general hospital in Ang Thong

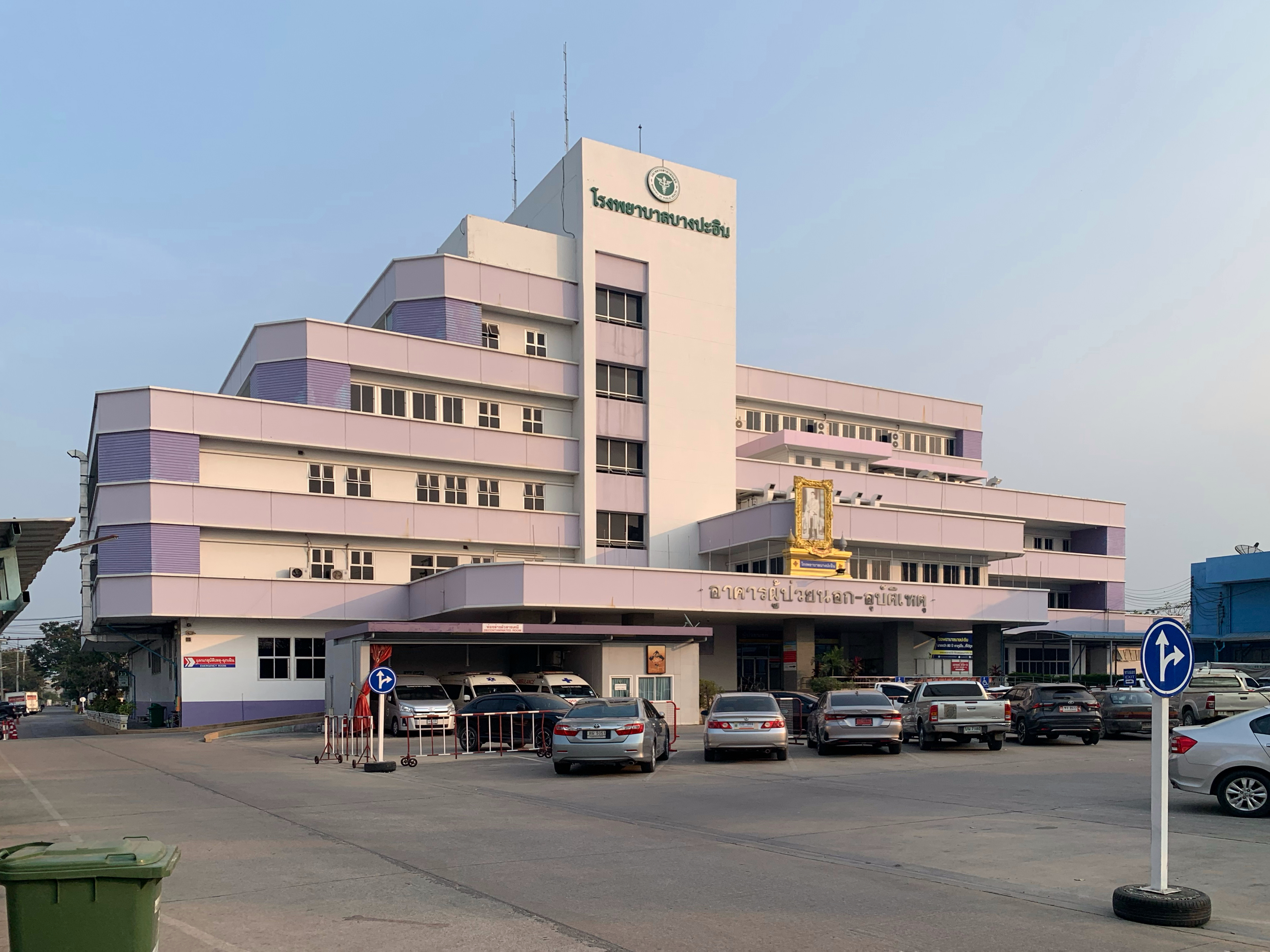
Bang Pa-in Hospital, a community hospital in Bang Pa-in district

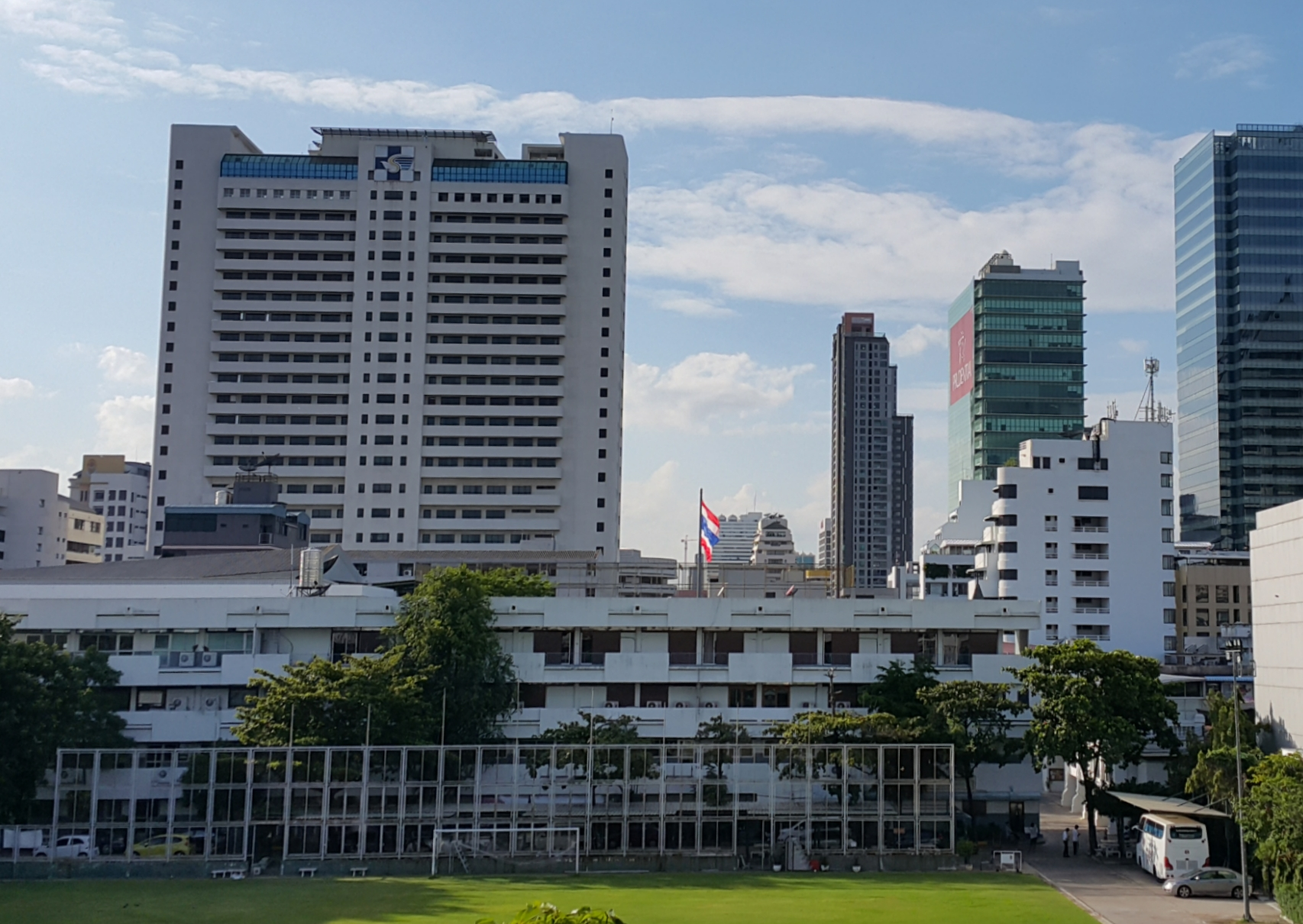
Saint Louis Hospital, a private hospital in Bangkok

Hospitals in Thailand are operated by both the public and private sector, to provide medical services for prevention, cure and rehabilitation of patients with medical and health-related conditions. The majority are operated by the Ministry of Public Health (MOPH). Private hospitals are regulated by the Medical Registration Division under the MOPH's Department of Health Service Support following the Sanatorium Act, B.E. 2541. Other government units and public organisations also operate hospitals, including the military, universities, local governments and the Red Cross. The full listing of hospitals can be accessed at List of hospitals in Thailand.

== Public hospitals ==
Most public (i.e., state-owned) hospitals fall under the authority of the Ministry of Public Health. The majority of these are provincial hospitals under the aegis of the Office of the Permanent Secretary of the MOPH. Others are operated by the Department of Medical Services, Department of Mental Health, Department of Health, and Department of Disease Control. Certain non-MOPH state agencies also operate hospitals.

=== Office of the Permanent Secretary ===
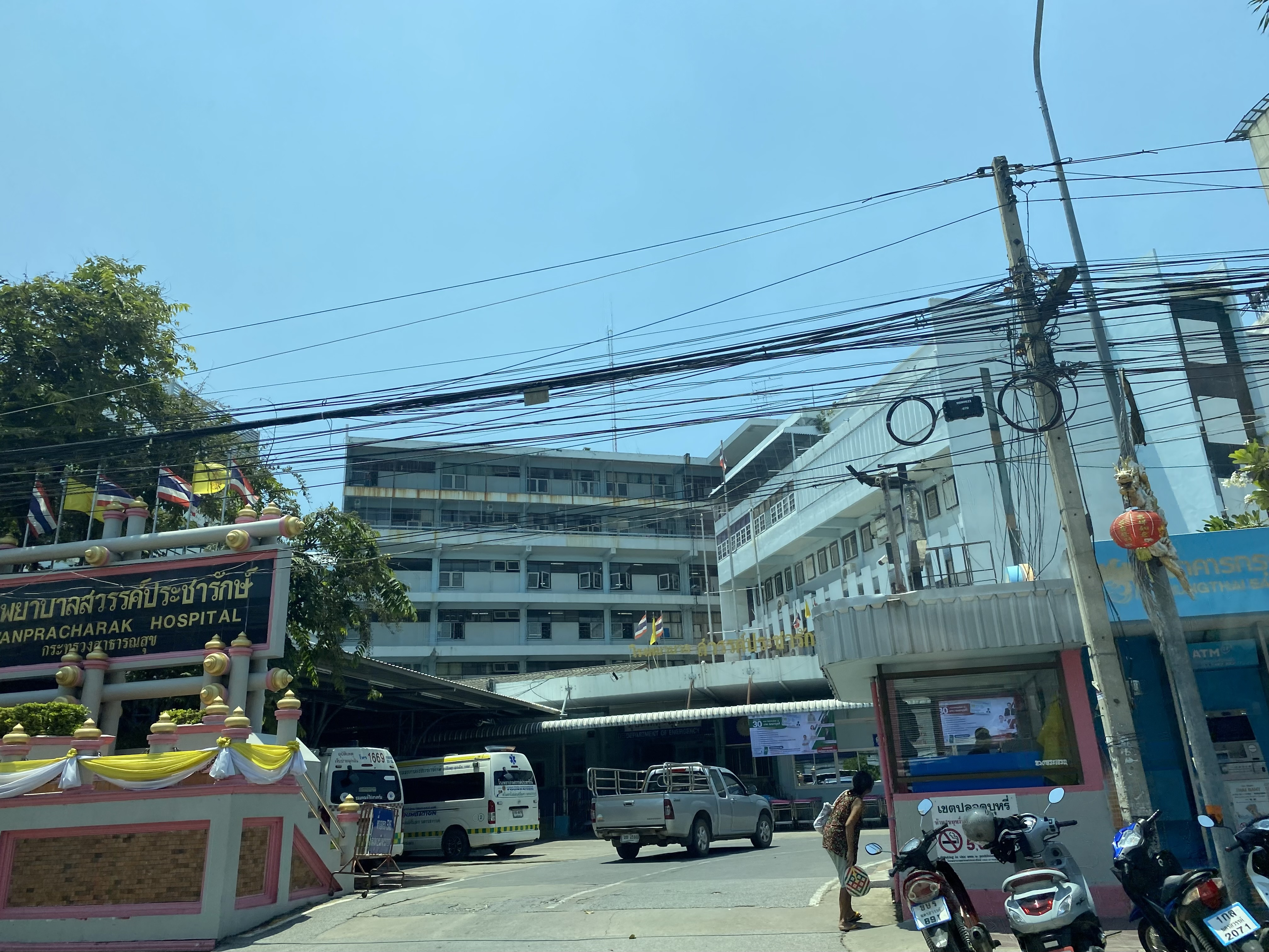
Sawanpracharak Hospital, the regional hospital of Nakhon Sawan Province

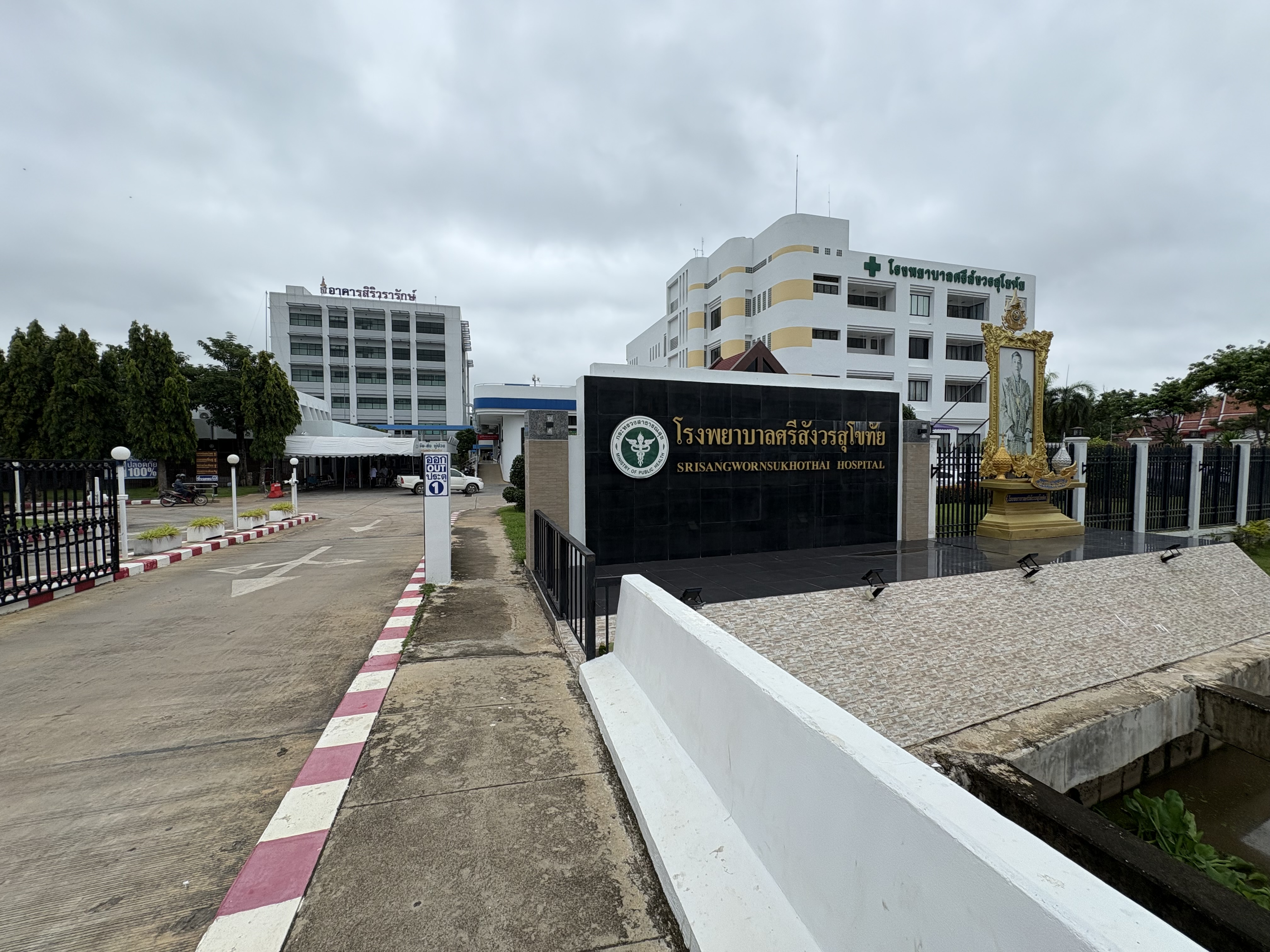
Srisangworn Sukhothai Hospital, a general hospital in Si Samrong district, Sukhothai Province

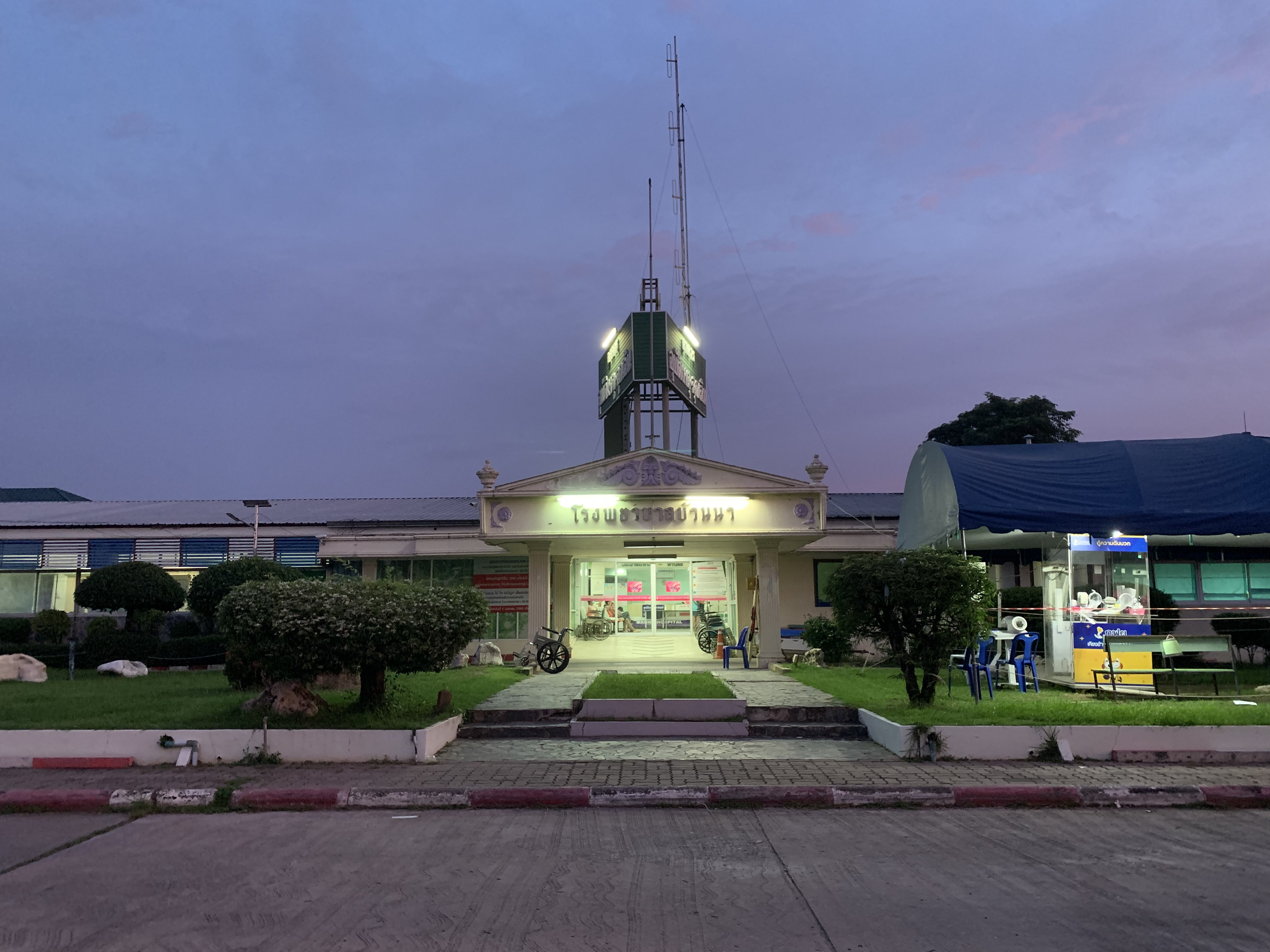
Banna Hospital, a community hospital in Ban Na district, Nakhon Nayok province

As of March 2022, there are a total of 901 hospitals under the Office of the Permanent Secretary are classified as follows:

==== Regional hospitals ====
Regional hospitals (Thai: โรงพยาบาลศูนย์) are found in provincial centres, have a capacity of at least 500 beds and have a comprehensive set of specialists on staff. These hospitals are capable of tertiary care and are under the category A (advanced) service level in the MOPH's service plan. As of 2018, there are a total of 34 regional hospitals in Thailand.

==== General hospitals ====
General hospitals (Thai: โรงพยาบาลทั่วไป) are located in province capitals or major districts and have a capacity of 200 to 500 beds. These hospitals are capable of secondary care and are under the category S and M1 service level. As of 2022, there are total of 92 general hospitals in Thailand.

==== Community hospitals ====
Community hospitals (Thai: โรงพยาบาลชุมชน) are located in the district level and are usually limited to providing primary care treatment and are under the category M2, F1, F2 and F3 service level. These will refer patients in need of more advanced or specialised care to general or regional hospitals. As of 2022, there are a total of 775 community hospitals in Thailand. Some community hospitals are capable of secondary care. They are further classified by size listed below:

- Large community hospitals have a capacity of 90 to 150 beds.
- Medium community hospitals have a capacity of 60 beds.
- Small community hospitals have a capacity of 10 to 30 beds.

===== Crown Prince Hospitals (Somdet Phra Yuppharat Hospitals) =====
Crown Prince hospitals (Thai: โรงพยาบาลสมเด็จพระยุพราช) are community hospitals (except Sa Kaeo, Sawang Daen Din and Det Udom which are general hospitals) with a capacity of 30 to 200 beds, all with capabilities of primary care and some providing secondary care. These hospitals are operated by the Crown Prince Hospital Foundation. Construction of 20 Crown Prince hospitals was initiated in 1977, during the prime ministership of Thanin Kraivichien, to provide medical services at distant locations throughout the country and as a present for King Vajiralongkorn's (then Crown Prince) royal marriage on 3 January 1977. There are 21 Crown Prince hospitals in Thailand.

==== Sub-district Health Promoting Hospitals ====
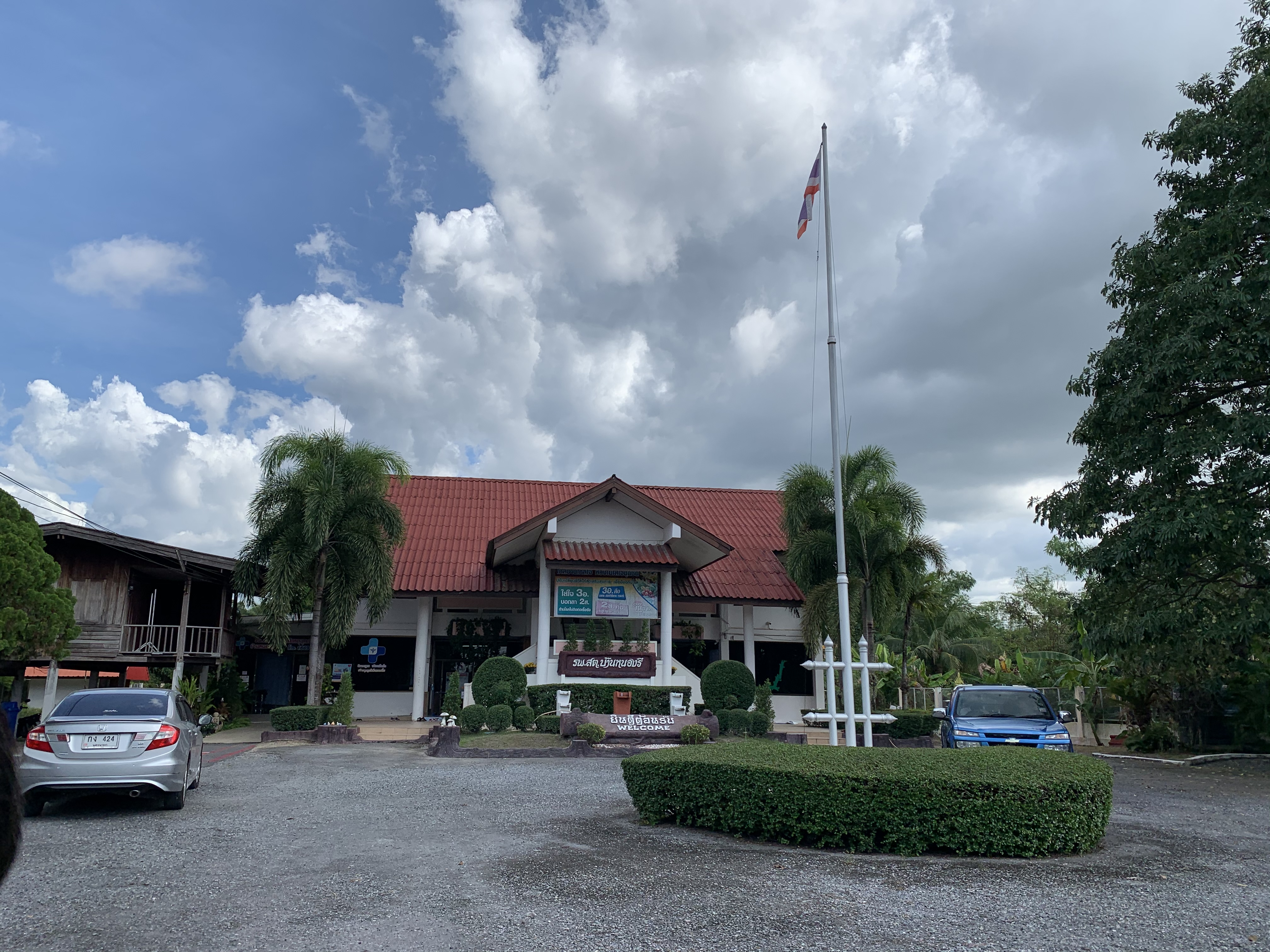
Ban Nong Ri Sub-district Health Promoting Hospital is located in Ban Na district, Nakhon Nayok province

Sub-district Health Promoting Hospitals (Thai: โรงพยาบาลส่งเสริมสุขภาพตำบล) are hospitals that are operated by either the MOPH or Department of Local Administration and were initially called "health stations" (Thai: สถานีอนามัย). These hospitals only have primary care capabilities and often serve villages within districts. Almost all of these hospitals do not accept inpatients and usually have no doctor on duty for the entire time. Such hospitals therefore will have medical staff entering irregularly from the community hospital within that district. In 2009, Abhisit Vejjajiva's cabinet approved a policy to improve the quality of healthcare services provided at health stations throughout Thailand and funding was allocated into the Thai Khem Khaeng programme to upgrade existing health stations to sub-district health promoting hospitals and improve quality of care.

==== Public Organisation ====
The idea of creating public organisations to improve the efficiency of the relatively backward governmental department management system emerged after the 1997 Asian financial crisis. After the enactment of the 8th National Social and Economic Development Plan devised by prime minister Chavalit Yongchayudh's cabinet, the MOPH reached out to the Asian Development Bank (ADB) to help revolutionize the operations of hospitals in the country and it was suggested that hospitals should be converted into public organisations to allow greater freedom of management as opposed to the traditional top-down approach. Ban Phaeo General Hospital in Samut Sakhon province is the first and only hospital in Thailand to have been converted into a public organisation.

=== Other departments ===
The Department of Medical Services (DMS) operates several public central hospitals in Bangkok, including Rajavithi Hospital and Lerdsin Hospital. It is also responsible for all specialised hospitals, both inside and outside Bangkok, such as the National Cancer Institute, the Neurological Institute of Thailand, the Queen Sirikit National Institute of Child Health. This is with some exceptions of public specialised hospitals in the field of psychiatry where all hospitals are under the responsibility of the Department of Mental Health (DMH), such as the Somdet Chaopraya Institute of Psychiatry and Srithanya Hospital. Some hospitals are also managed by the Department of Disease Control (DDC), the main hospital being the Bamrasnaradura Infectious Disease Institute.

=== Non-MOPH agencies ===
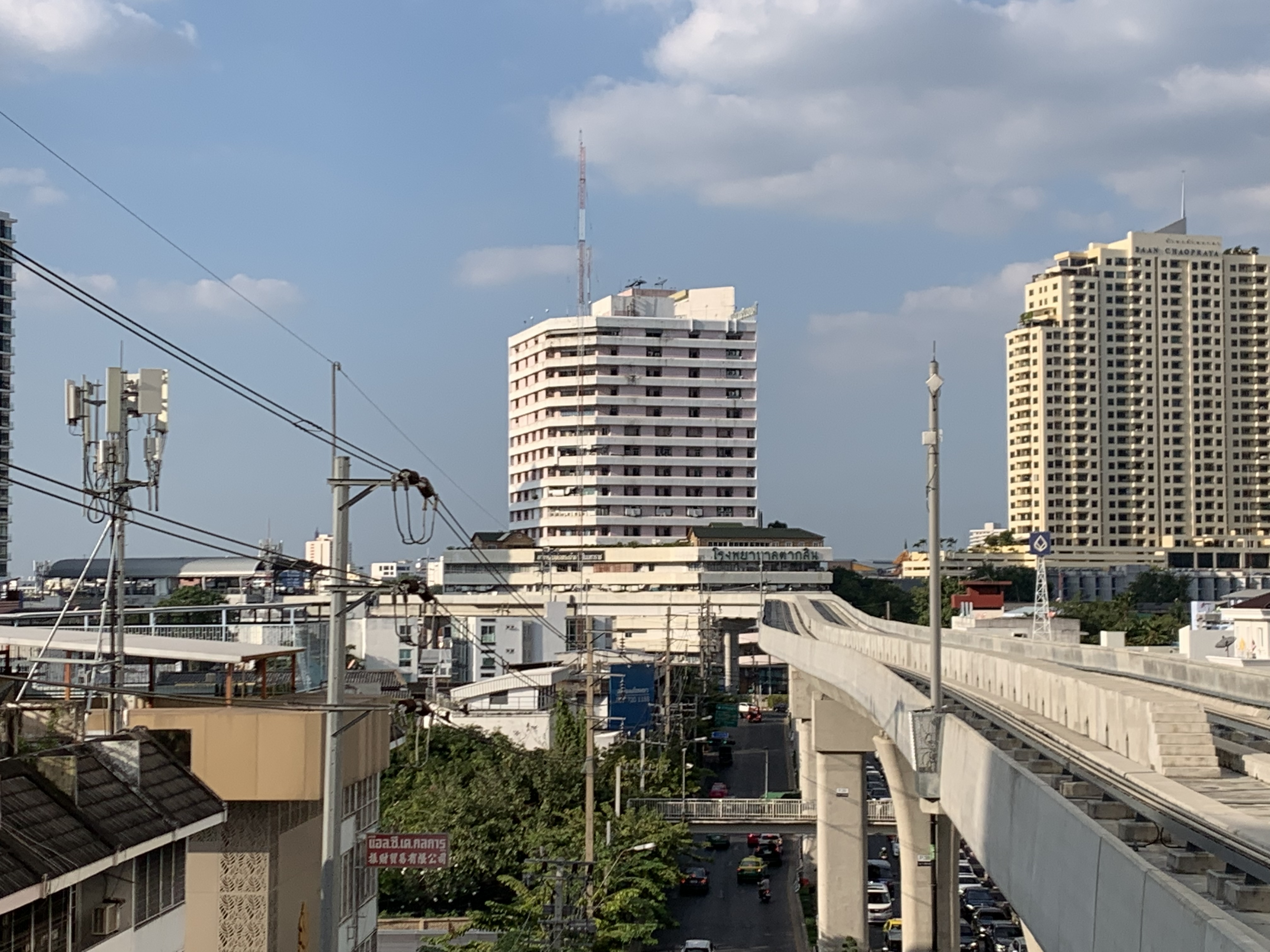
Taksin Hospital in Bangkok is operated by Bangkok Metropolitan Administration

Other organisations also operate public hospitals in Thailand and citizens of Thailand can use their medical services under the Universal Coverage Scheme at no additional cost. These organisations include:

- Thai Red Cross Society
- Ministry of Defence
  - Army Medical Department, Royal Thai Army
  - Naval Medical Department, Royal Thai Navy
  - Directorate of Medical Services, Royal Thai Air Force
  - Medical Division, Armed Forces Academies Preparatory School

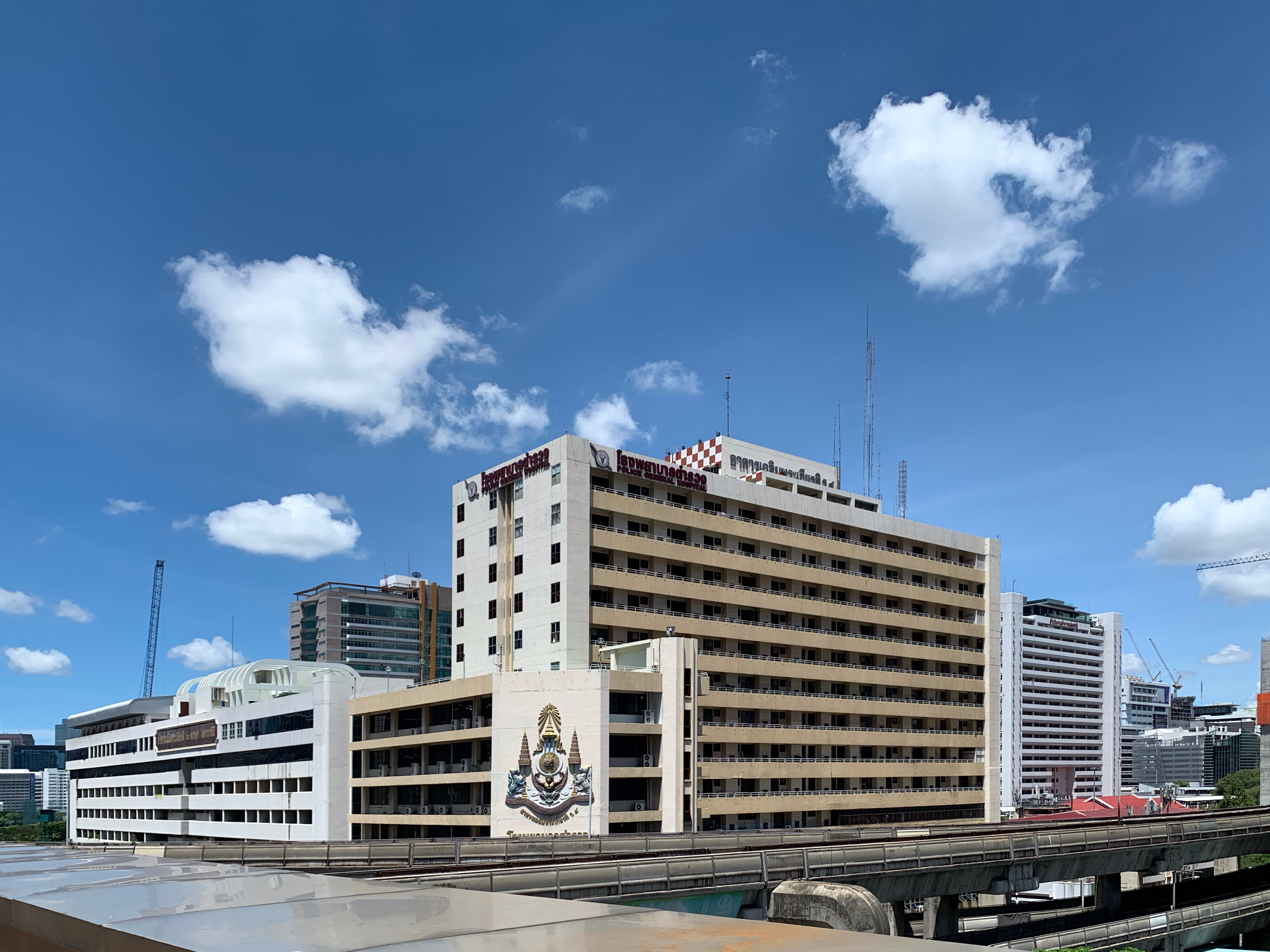
Police General Hospital, operated by the Royal Thai Police

- Office of the Surgeon General, Royal Thai Police
- Ministry of Justice
- Ministry of Finance
- Bangkok Metropolitan Administration
- Department of Local Administration
  - Pattaya City
  - Phuket Provincial Administration
  - Surat Thani Provincial Administration
  - Nakhon Si Thammarat City Municipality
  - Udon Thani City Municipality
  - Chiang Mai City Municipality
- State Railway of Thailand
- Port Authority of Thailand
- Metropolitan Electricity Authority

=== University-affiliated hospitals ===
This type of hospital is affiliated with faculties of medicine at universities and colleges in Thailand. Most of these hospitals are under the responsibility of the Ministry of Higher Education, Science, Research and Innovation and provide medical services at the "super tertiary care" level. These hospitals are equipped with the best resources in Thailand considering they are medical schools for teaching and research. However, in the table below, some hospitals are under the authority of the affiliated university, but are not used for medical student training, but rather only for research purposes or to provide specialised treatment; and some although used for teaching, are not operated by the affiliated university.

Main university-affiliated hospitals for medical training in Thailand
Hospital name	Affiliated university	Affiliated institution (if present)	Province
Siriraj Hospital	Faculty of Medicine Siriraj Hospital, Mahidol University		Bangkok
Ramathibodi Hospital	Faculty of Medicine Ramathibodi Hospital, Mahidol University HRH Princess Chulabhorn College of Medical Science		Bangkok
Chakri Naruebodindra Medical Institute	Faculty of Medicine Ramathibodi Hospital, Mahidol University		Samut Prakan
King Chulalongkorn Memorial Hospital	Faculty of Medicine, Chulalongkorn University	Thai Red Cross Society	Bangkok
Maharaj Nakorn Chiang Mai Hospital	Faculty of Medicine, Chiang Mai University		Chiang Mai
Phramongkutklao Hospital	Phramongkutklao College of Medicine	Army Medical Department, The Royal Thai Army	Bangkok
Vajira Hospital	Faculty of Medicine Vajira Hospital, Navamindradhiraj University		Bangkok
Taksin Hospital	Faculty of Medicine Vajira Hospital, Navamindradhiraj University	Medical Services Department, Bangkok Metropolitan Administration	Bangkok
Rajavithi Hospital	College of Medicine, Rangsit University	Department of Medical Services, MOPH	Bangkok
Queen Sirikit National Institute of Child Health	College of Medicine, Rangsit University	Department of Medical Services, MOPH	Bangkok
Lerdsin Hospital	College of Medicine, Rangsit University	Department of Medical Services, MOPH	Bangkok
Nopparat Rajathanee Hospital	College of Medicine, Rangsit University	Department of Medical Services, MOPH	Bangkok
Srinagarind Hospital	Faculty of Medicine, Khon Kaen University		Khon Kaen
Galyanivadhanakarun Hospital	Faculty of Medicine, Princess of Naradhiwas University		Narathiwat
Thammasat University Hospital	Faculty of Medicine, Thammasat University Chulabhorn International College of Medicine (CICM), Thammasat University	Office of the Rector of Thammasat University	Pathum Thani
HRH Princess Maha Chakri Sirindhorn Medical Center	Faculty of Medicine, Srinakharinwirot University		Nakhon Nayok
Panyananthaphikkhu Chonprathan Medical Center	Faculty of Medicine, Srinakharinwirot University		Nonthaburi
Naresuan University Hospital	Faculty of Medicine, Naresuan University		Phitsanulok
Songklanagarind Hospital	Faculty of Medicine, Prince of Songkla University		Songkhla
Suranaree University of Technology Hospital	Institute of Medicine, Suranaree University of Technology		Nakhon Ratchasima
Suddhavej Hospital	Faculty of Medicine, Mahasarakham University		Maha Sarakham
Ubon Ratchathani University Hospital	College of Medicine and Public Health, Ubon Ratchathani University		Ubon Ratchathani
Burapha University Hospital	Faculty of Medicine, Burapha University		Chonburi
Walailak University Hospital	School of Medicine, Walailak University		Nakhon Si Thammarat
University of Phayao Medical Center and Hospital	School of Medicine, University of Phayao		Phayao
Phra Nang Klao Hospital	School of Medicine, Siam University		Nonthaburi
Mae Fah Luang University Medical Center Hospital	School of Medicine, Mae Fah Luang University		Chiang Rai
Bangkok Metropolitan Administration General Hospital	School of Medicine, Mae Fah Luang University	Medical Services Department, Bangkok Metropolitan Administration	Bangkok
Charoenkrung Pracharak Hospital	School of Medicine, Mae Fah Luang University	Medical Services Department, Bangkok Metropolitan Administration	Bangkok
Chulabhorn Hospital (Bangkok)	HRH Princess Chulabhorn College of Medical Science		Bangkok
Police General Hospital	HRH Princess Chulabhorn College of Medical Science	Office of the Surgeon General, Royal Thai Police	Bangkok
Sirindhorn Hospital	Faculty of Medicine, King Mongkut's Institute of Technology Ladkrabang	Medical Services Department, Bangkok Metropolitan Administration	Bangkok
Lat Krabang Hospital	Faculty of Medicine, King Mongkut's Institute of Technology Ladkrabang	Medical Services Department, Bangkok Metropolitan Administration	Bangkok
Ratchaphiphat Hospital	Faculty of Medicine, Bangkokthonburi University	Medical Services Department, Bangkok Metropolitan Administration	Bangkok
Kamphaeng Phet Hospital	Faculty of Medicine, Western University		Kamphaeng Phet

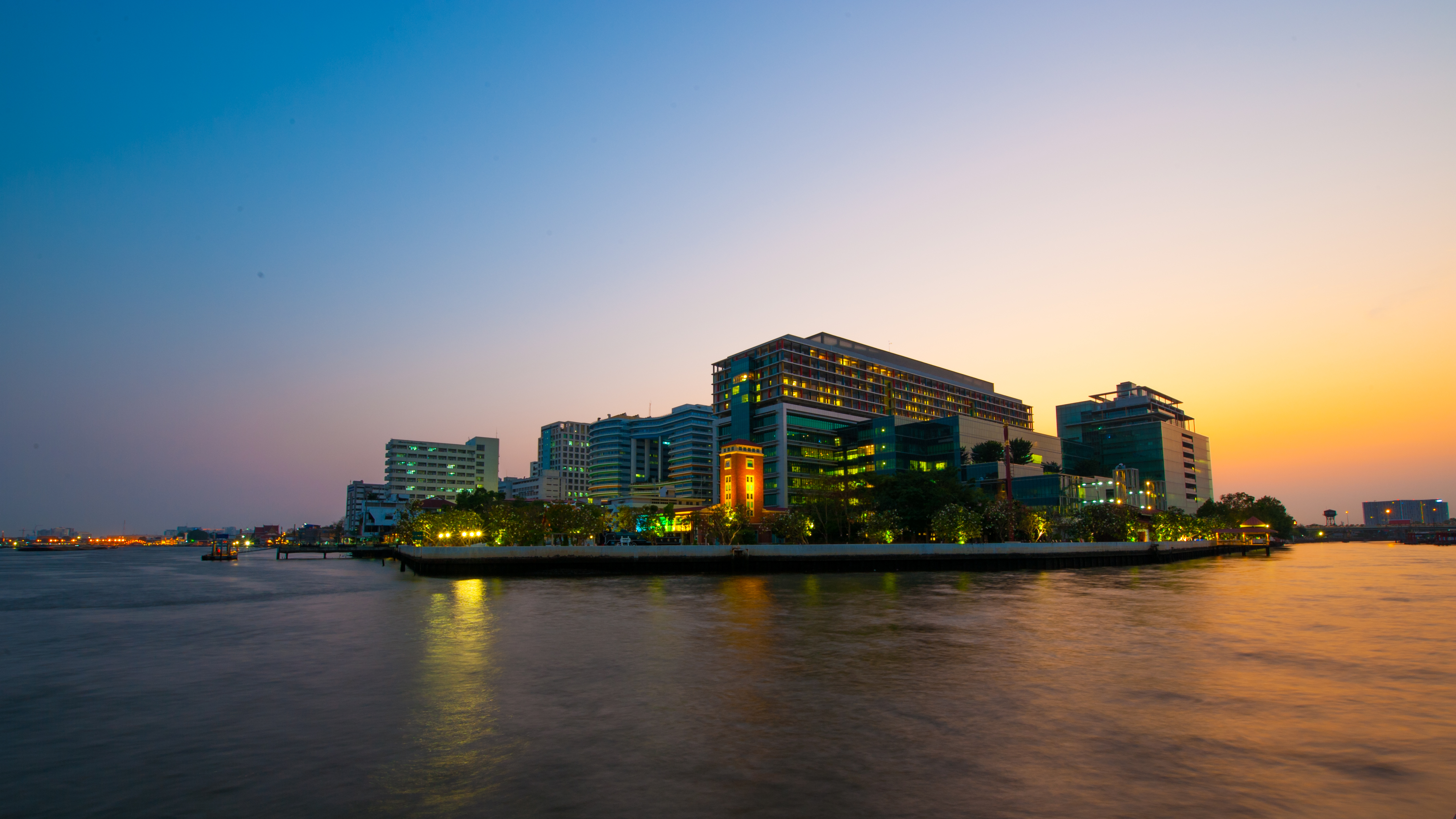
Siriraj Hospital, a university hospital

Non-teaching University-affiliated Hospitals in Thailand
Hospital Name	Affiliated University	Province
Siriraj Piyamaharajkarun Hospital	Faculty of Medicine Siriraj Hospital, Mahidol University	Bangkok
Golden Jubilee Medical Center	Faculty of Medicine Siriraj Hospital, Mahidol University	Nakhon Pathom
Hospital for Tropical Diseases	Faculty of Tropical Medicine, Mahidol University	Bangkok
Queen Sirikit Heart Center of the Northeast	Faculty of Medicine, Khon Kaen University	Khon Kaen

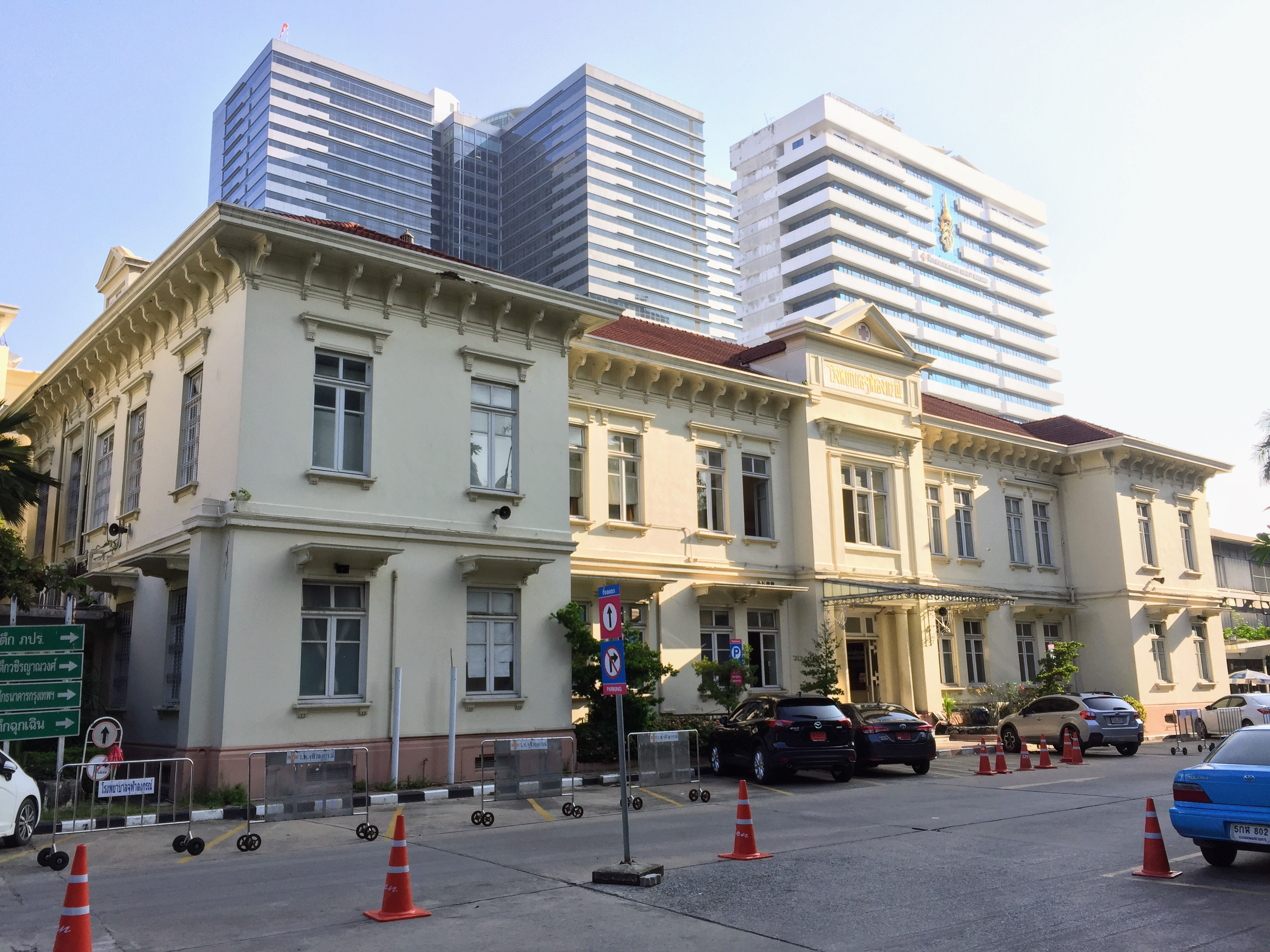
King Chulalongkorn Memorial Hospital, a university hospital

=== CPIRD Medical Education Centers ===
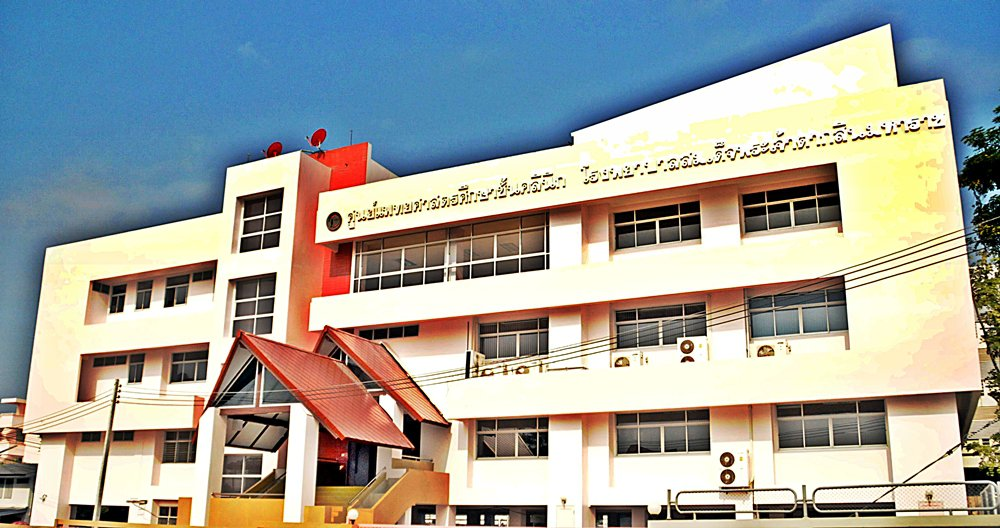
CPIRD Medical Education Center, Somdejphrajaotaksin Maharaj Hospital, Tak Province

In 1994, the cabinet approved of a cooperation between the MOPH and Thai universities to organise a program known as the 'Collaborative Project to Increase Production of Rural Doctors (CPIRD)' in order to increase the number of medical personnel in rural areas of Thailand. To reach these goals, the cabinet set up the CPIRD Office in 1997 to oversee the project's activities. In terms of education, the preclinic level of study (years 1–3) will take place at the student's university or college. At the clinical level of study (years 4–6), study will take place at hospitals all around the country under the guidance of the MOPH. 'Medical Education Centers' (Thai: ศูนย์แพทยศาสตรศึกษา ชั้นคลินิก) have been established for medical students in the CPIRD program at these hospitals. There are currently 45 CPIRD Medical Education Centers in Thailand.

Hospitals with CPIRD Medical Education Centers in Thailand
Hospital name	Affiliated university	Affiliated institution (if present)	Province
Khon Kaen Hospital	Faculty of Medicine, Khon Kaen University		Khon Kaen
Sunpasitthiprasong Hospital	Faculty of Medicine, Khon Kaen University College of Medicine and Public Health, Ubon Ratchathani University		Ubon Ratchathani
Maha Sarakham Hospital	Faculty of Medicine, Khon Kaen University		Maha Sarakham
Udon Thani Hospital	Faculty of Medicine, Khon Kaen University		Udon Thani
Prapokklao Hospital	Faculty of Medicine, Chulalongkorn University		Chanthaburi
Chonburi Hospital	Faculty of Medicine, Chulalongkorn University		Chonburi
Bhumibol Adulyadej Hospital	Faculty of Medicine, Chulalongkorn University	Directorate of Medical Services, The Royal Thai Air Force	Bangkok
Chiangrai Prachanukroh Hospital	Faculty of Medicine, Chiang Mai University		Chiang Rai
Lampang Hospital	Faculty of Medicine, Chiang Mai University		Lampang
Saraburi Hospital	Faculty of Medicine, Thammasat University		Saraburi
Chumphon Khet Udomsak Hospital	Faculty of Medicine, Thammasat University		Chumphon
Surat Thani Hospital	Faculty of Medicine, Thammasat University		Surat Thani
Buddhasothorn Hospital	Faculty of Medicine, Thammasat University		Chachoengsao
Naradhiwas Rajanagarindra Hospital	Faculty of Medicine, Princess of Naradhiwas University		Narathiwat
Songkhla Hospital	Faculty of Medicine, Princess of Naradhiwas University		Songkhla
Phichit Hospital	Faculty of Medicine, Naresuan University		Phichit
Buddhachinaraj Phitsanulok Hospital	Faculty of Medicine, Naresuan University		Phitsanulok
Phrae Hospital	Faculty of Medicine, Naresuan University		Phrae
Somdejphrajaotaksin Maharaj Hospital	Faculty of Medicine, Naresuan University		Tak
Uttaradit Hospital	Faculty of Medicine, Naresuan University		Uttaradit
Chaophraya Abhaibhubejhr Hospital	Faculty of Medicine, Burapha University		Prachinburi
Rayong Hospital	Faculty of Medicine, Burapha University		Rayong
Queen Sirikit Naval Hospital	Faculty of Medicine, Burapha University	Naval Medical Department, The Royal Thai Navy	Chonburi
Queen Savang Vadhana Memorial Hospital	Faculty of Medicine, Burapha University	Thai Red Cross Society	Chonburi
Nakornping Hospital	School of Medicine, University of Phayao		Chiang Mai
Phayao Hospital	School of Medicine, University of Phayao		Phayao
Maharat Nakhon Ratchasima Hospital	MOPH-Mahidol CPIRD Program		Nakhon Ratchasima
Maharaj Nakhon Si Thammarat Hospital	MOPH-Mahidol CPIRD Program		Nakhon Si Thammarat
Sawanpracharak Hospital	MOPH-Mahidol CPIRD Program		Nakhon Sawan
Ratchaburi Hospital	MOPH-Mahidol CPIRD Program		Ratchaburi
Kalasin Hospital	Faculty of Medicine, Mahasarakham University		Kalasin
Roi Et Hospital	Faculty of Medicine, Mahasarakham University		Roi Et
Srisangworn Sukhothai Hospital	School of Medicine, Mae Fah Luang University		Sukhothai
Sukhothai Hospital	School of Medicine, Mae Fah Luang University		Sukhothai
Vachira Phuket Hospital	School of Medicine, Walailak University		Phuket
Trang Hospital	School of Medicine, Walailak University Faculty of Medicine, Prince of Songkla University		Trang
Hatyai Hospital	Faculty of Medicine, Prince of Songkla University		Songkhla
Yala Hospital	Faculty of Medicine, Prince of Songkla University		Yala
Surin Hospital	Institute of Medicine, Suranaree University of Technology		Surin
Buriram Hospital	Institute of Medicine, Suranaree University of Technology		Buriram
Chaiyaphum Hospital	Institute of Medicine, Suranaree University of Technology		Chaiyaphum
Sisaket Hospital	College of Medicine and Public Health, Ubon Ratchathani University		Sisaket

== Private hospitals ==
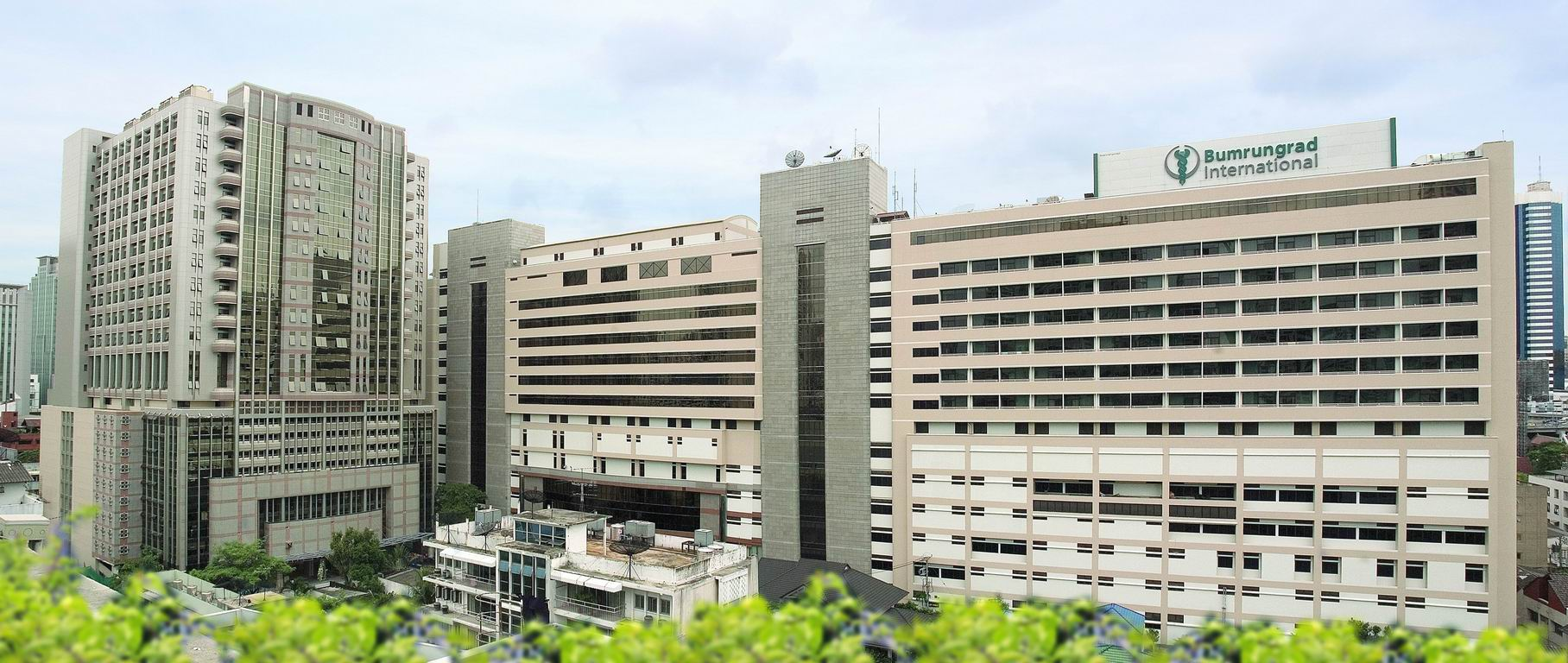
Bumrungrad International Hospital, a private hospital

Some hospitals in Thailand are operated by the private sector by either a private limited company or a public limited company. Specialised private hospitals in the fields of ophthalmology and dentistry are common.

The term "general hospital", when referring to private hospitals, refer to hospitals which provide non-specialised care. Private hospitals with fewer than 30 beds are officially termed "health centres". Both accept patient admissions.

== See also ==
- Health in Thailand
- Healthcare in Thailand
- List of hospitals in Thailand
- List of medical schools in Thailand
