= Naresuan (disambiguation) =

Naresuan was ruler of Siam from 1590 to 1605.

Naresuan may also refer to:

- Naresuan University, a university in Thailand named after the king
  - Naresuan University Hospital, a teaching hospital of the Faculty of Medicine Naresuan University
- King Naresuan (film), a 2006 film based on the king's life
- HTMS Naresuan, a Royal Thai Navy frigate
