= Phichit Hospital =

Phichit Hospital โรงพยาบาลพิจิตร
- The Ministry of Public Health Health District 3

Geography
- Location: 136 Nai Mueang Subdistrict, Mueang Phichit District, Phichit 66000, Thailand
- Coordinates: 16.435040°N 100.344829°E

Organisation
- Type: General
- Affiliated university: Faculty of Medicine, Naresuan University

Services
- Beds: 456

History
- Founded: 1953

Links
- Website: pichithosp.net/pchweb/index.php
- Lists: Hospitals in Thailand

Phichit Hospital (Thai: โรงพยาบาลพิจิตร) is the main hospital of Phichit Province, Thailand. It is classified under the Ministry of Public Health as a general hospital. It has a CPIRD Medical Education Center which trains doctors for the Faculty of Medicine of Naresuan University.

== History ==
The construction of Phichit Hospital was started in 1950 and the hospital opened for outpatients in 1953 with one building capable of 30 beds. Capability for patient admission was available the following year. In 2004, the hospital made an agreement to train medical students and act as a clinical teaching hospital for the Faculty of Medicine, Naresuan University and about 10 students are trained here annually under the Collaborative Project to Increase Production of Rural Doctors (CPIRD) program. The hospital received HA and HPH accreditation in 2005.

== See also ==
- Healthcare in Thailand
- Hospitals in Thailand
- List of hospitals in Thailand
