= Uttaradit Hospital =

Uttaradit Hospital โรงพยาบาลอุตรดิตถ์
- The Ministry of Public Health Health District 2

Geography
- Location: 38 Jesadabodin Road, Tha It Subdistrict, Mueang Uttaradit district, Uttaradit 53000, Thailand
- Coordinates: 17.619140°N 100.086994°E

Organisation
- Type: Regional
- Affiliated university: Faculty of Medicine, Naresuan University

Services
- Beds: 655

History
- Founded: 12 April 1951

Links
- Website: uttaradit-hosp.moph.go.th/utth_home/Home
- Lists: Hospitals in Thailand

Uttaradit Hospital (Thai: โรงพยาบาลอุตรดิตถ์) is the main hospital of Uttaradit province, Thailand. It is classified under the Ministry of Public Health as a regional hospital. It has a CPIRD Medical Education Center which trains doctors for the Faculty of Medicine of Naresuan University. It is capable of tertiary care.

== History ==
The construction of Uttaradit Hospital started in 1940 during World War II, initiated by Khun Phra Samak Samoson, then governor of Uttaradit. The hospital opened on 12 April 1951. In 1999, the hospital made an agreement to train medical students and act as a clinical teaching hospital for the Faculty of Medicine, Naresuan University and about 30 students are trained here annually under the Collaborative Project to Increase Production of Rural Doctors (CPIRD) program.

== See also ==
- Healthcare in Thailand
- Hospitals in Thailand
- List of hospitals in Thailand
