= School of Medicine, University of Phayao =

- คณะแพทยศาสตร์ มหาวิทยาลัยพะเยา
- Type: Public (non-profit)
- Established: 1 December 2008
- Parent institution: University of Phayao
- Dean: Prof. Weerapol Chandeeying, M.D.
- Location: 19 Mu 2, Phahonyothin Road, Mae Ka Subdistrict, Mueang Phayao District, Phayao 56000, Thailand
- Colors: Green
- Website: http://www.medicine.up.ac.th/medicine/

The School of Medicine, University of Phayao (Thai: คณะแพทยศาสตร์ มหาวิทยาลัยพะเยา) is a medical school in Mueang Phayao District, Phayao Province.

== History ==
In 2007, a school of medical sciences was established at the Naresuan University Phayao IT Campus and initially admitted students for the Physical Therapy, Medical Technology and Public Health branches. Following changes in the structure of the university and in preparation for the creation of the new University of Phayao, the planned medical course would be taught in a separate medical school. The branches of Physical Therapy, Medical Technology and Public Health then became part of the School of Allied Health Sciences since 1 October 2008. The School of Medicine was formally set up on 1 December 2008.

== Program of Study ==
- Doctor of Medicine
- Bachelor of Science (Emergency Medical Operation)

== Teaching Hospitals ==
- University of Phayao Hospital
- Nakornping Hospital (CPIRD)
- Phayao Hospital (CPIRD)

== See also ==
- List of medical schools in Thailand
