= Somdejphrajaotaksin Maharaj Hospital =

Somdejphrajaotaksin Maharaj Hospital โรงพยาบาลสมเด็จพระเจ้าตากสินมหาราช
- The Ministry of Public Health Health District 2

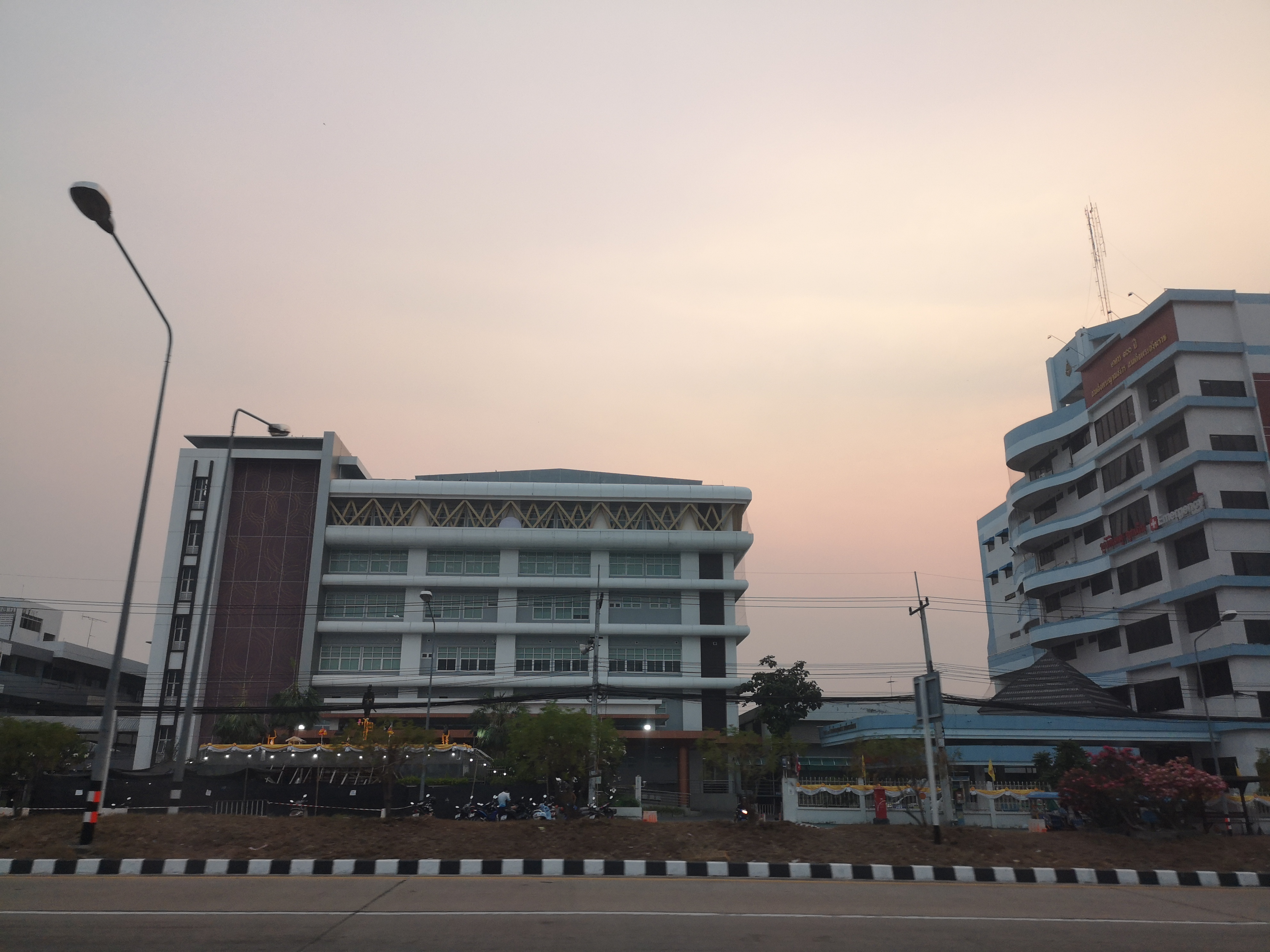

Geography
- Location: 16/2 Phahonyothin Road, Rahaeng Subdistrict, Mueang Tak District, Tak 63000, Thailand
- Coordinates: 16.873030°N 99.131575°E

Organisation
- Type: General
- Affiliated university: Faculty of Medicine, Naresuan University

Services
- Beds: 310

History
- Former name: Tak Hospital
- Opened: 24 June 1944

Links
- Website: www.tsm.go.th
- Lists: Hospitals in Thailand

Somdejphrajaotaksin Maharaj Hospital (Thai: โรงพยาบาลสมเด็จพระเจ้าตากสินมหาราช, lit. King Taksin the Great Hospital) is the main hospital of Tak Province, Thailand. It is classified under the Ministry of Public Health as a general hospital. It has a CPIRD Medical Education Center which trains doctors for the Faculty of Medicine of Naresuan University.

== History ==
The construction of Tak Hospital was started in November 1939 by Mang Saichum-in, governor of Tak, but it was delayed due to the start of World War II. Nevertheless, the hospital opened on 24 June 1944 with one building capable of 25 beds. It was expanded to 100 beds in 1959 as there were no other hospitals in the surrounding areas of Kamphaeng Phet Province, Sukhothai Province and Thoen District in Lampang Province. On 6 June 1984, the name of the hospital was changed to Somdejphrajaotaksin Maharaj Hospital in commemoration of King Taksin. In 2005, the hospital made an agreement to train medical students and act as a clinical teaching hospital for the Faculty of Medicine, Naresuan University under the Collaborative Project to Increase Production of Rural Doctors (CPIRD) program.

== See also ==
- Healthcare in Thailand
- Hospitals in Thailand
- List of hospitals in Thailand
