= Nakornping Hospital =

Nakornping Hospital โรงพยาบาลนครพิงค์
- Ministry of Public Health Health District 1

Geography
- Location: 159 Chotana Rd, Tambon Don Kaeo, Mae Rim District, Chiang Mai 50180, Thailand
- Coordinates: 13°46′50″N 100°30′33″E

Organisation
- Type: Teaching University Hospital, Public
- Affiliated university: School of Medicine, University of Phayao; Faculty of Medicine, Chiang Mai University

Services
- Beds: 742

History
- Opened: 1980

Links
- Website: www.nkp-hospital.go.th
- Lists: Hospitals in Thailand

Nakornping Hospital (Thai: โรงพยาบาลนครพิงค์) is a hospital located in Chiang Mai, Thailand. It is the second largest hospital in Chiang Mai with an in-patient capacity of 742 beds as of 2022. It is now serving as the regional hospital of Chiang Mai province. It is a CPIRD Medical Education Center for the School of Medicine, University of Phayao. It is an affiliated teaching hospital of the Faculty of Medicine, Chiang Mai University.

== See also ==
- Hospitals in Thailand
- List of Hospitals in Thailand
