= Roi Et Hospital =

Roi Et Hospital โรงพยาบาลร้อยเอ็ด
- The Ministry of Public Health Health District 7

Geography
- Location: 111 Ronnachan Chaiyut Road, Nai Mueang Subdistrict, Mueang Roi Et District, Roi Et 45000, Thailand

Organisation
- Type: Regional
- Affiliated university: Faculty of Medicine, Mahasarakham University; Faculty of Medicine Vajira Hospital, Navamindradhiraj University

Services
- Beds: 879

History
- Founded: 5 September 1940

Links
- Website: reh.go.th
- Lists: Hospitals in Thailand

Roi Et Hospital (Thai: โรงพยาบาลร้อยเอ็ด) is the main hospital of Roi Et Province, Thailand. It is classified under the Ministry of Public Health as a regional hospital. It has a CPIRD Medical Education Center which trains doctors for the Faculty of Medicine of Mahasarakham University. It is an affiliated teaching hospital of the Faculty of Medicine Vajira Hospital, Navamindradhiraj University.

== History ==
The foundation stone of Roi Et Hospital was laid on 5 September 1940 on the grounds of the Old Suea Pa Club. The building was completed and opened to the public on 24 June 1941. In 2009, the hospital made an agreement to train medical students and act as a clinical teaching hospital for the Faculty of Medicine, Mahasarakham University under the Collaborative Project to Increase Production of Rural Doctors (CPIRD) program.

== See also ==
- Healthcare in Thailand
- Hospitals in Thailand
- List of hospitals in Thailand
