= Mae Ka, Phayao =

Mae Ka แม่กา
- Tambon
- Location within Thailand
- Coordinates: 19°5′39″N 99°54′49″E
- Country: Thailand
- Province: Phayao
- Amphoe: Mueang Phayao

Population (2005)
  - Total: 17,629
- Time zone: UTC+7 (Thailand)

Mae Ka (Thai: แม่กา, pronounced [mɛ̂ː kāː]) is a village and subdistrict (tambon) in Mueang Phayao District, in Phayao Province, Thailand. As of 2005, it has a total population of 17,629 people. It is located in the south-western part of the province, not far from the border with Lampang Province. It lies along the National Road 1 (Phahon Yothin Road), and is connected by road to Phayao in the north and Luang Tai in Lampang Province in the south. The University of Phayao lies to the south of the main urban area.

== Education ==
- University of Phayao
- Mahachulalongkornrajavidyalaya University Phayao Campus
- Demonstration School University of Phayao (DESUP)
- Ban Mae Ka School
- Ban Mae Tam Noi School
- Ban Huai Kein School
- Ban Mae Tam Boon Yong School
- Anuban Muaeng Phayao (Ban Thok Wak) School

== Health ==
- University of Phayao Medical Center and Hospital
- Ban Mae Ka Health Promotion Hospital
- Ban Huai Kein Health Promotion Hospital
