= Phra Nang Klao Hospital =

Phra Nang Klao Hospital โรงพยาบาลพระนั่งเกล้า
- The Ministry of Public Health Health District 4

Geography
- Location: 91 Nonthaburi Road, Bang Krasor Subdistrict, Mueang Nonthaburi District, Nonthaburi 11000, Thailand
- Coordinates: 13.865289°N 100.481428°E

Organisation
- Type: Regional
- Affiliated university: School of Medicine, Siam University; Faculty of Medicine Siriraj Hospital, Mahidol University

Services
- Beds: 515

History
- Former name: Nonthaburi Hospital
- Founded: 24 June 1957

Links
- Website: www.pranangklao.go.th
- Lists: Hospitals in Thailand

Phra Nang Klao Hospital (Thai: โรงพยาบาลพระนั่งเกล้า) is the main public hospital of Nonthaburi Province, Thailand and is classified under the Ministry of Public Health as a regional hospital. It is capable of initial tertiary-level care. Its closest rapid transit station is Phra Nang Klao Bridge MRT station on the MRT Purple Line. It is the main teaching hospital of the School of Medicine, Siam University and an affiliated teaching hospital of the Faculty of Medicine Siriraj Hospital, Mahidol University.

== History ==
Initially, Nonthaburi Province had no hospital of its own and patients had to go into Bangkok (Phra Nakhon) or Thonburi to access healthcare. Plans were drawn in 1956 and on 24 June 1957, Nonthaburi Hospital was opened with two buildings, a patient building and an administrative building. Even so, hospital use did not gain popularity due to the low amount of staff present. In 1987, after rapid economic development into the province, and the construction of Rattanathibet Road, the hospital was gradually expanded. In 1989, the hospital was renamed to Phra Nang Klao Hospital in commemoration of King Nangklao (Rama III).

Phra Nang Klao Hospital is used as a clinical teaching site for medical students of the School of Medicine, Siam University since January 2016.

== See also ==
- Healthcare in Thailand
- Hospitals in Thailand
- List of hospitals in Thailand
