= Buddhachinaraj Phitsanulok Hospital =

Buddhachinaraj Phitsanulok Hospital โรงพยาบาลพุทธชินราช พิษณุโลก
- The Ministry of Public Health Health District 2

Geography
- Location: 90 Srithamtraipidok Road, Nai Mueang Subdistrict, Mueang Phitsanulok District, Phitsanulok 65000, Thailand
- Coordinates: 16.808436°N 100.263549°E

Organisation
- Type: Regional
- Affiliated university: Faculty of Medicine, Naresuan University; Faculty of Medicine Siriraj Hospital, Mahidol University

Services
- Beds: 922

History
- Former name: Phitsanulok Hospital
- Opened: 20 November 1940

Links
- Website: www.budhosp.go.th/home/
- Lists: Hospitals in Thailand

Buddhachinaraj Phitsanulok Hospital (Thai: โรงพยาบาลพุทธชินราช พิษณุโลก) is the main hospital of Phitsanulok Province, Thailand, and is classified under the Ministry of Public Health (MOPH) as a regional hospital. It has a CPIRD Medical Education Center which trains doctors of the Faculty of Medicine, Naresuan University. It is an affiliated teaching hospital of the Faculty of Medicine Siriraj Hospital, Mahidol University.

== History ==
Prior to 1940, Phitsanulok only had a health station named 'Benjamarachanusorn Health Station'. In 1939, the Governor of Phitsanulok, along with local doctors and nobility requested funding from the Public Health Division (now the MOPH, then operated by the Ministry of Interior) for the construction of a hospital in Phitsanulok. Construction was started on 20 November 1940, which is considered to be the founding date of the hospital. However, the hospital was not completed due to the Franco-Thai War with French Indochina. The hospital was temporarily opened on 15 June 1941. Construction was then completed in November and was officially opened on 1 November in the same year, with a capacity of 50 beds, half for each gender. The hospital was initially named 'Phitsanulok Hospital' but was later renamed to 'Buddhachinaraj Phitsanulok Hospital' in reverence of Phra Phuttha Chinarat, a famous buddha figure in Wat Phra Sri Rattana Mahathat.

In 1949, the Buddhachinaraj Nursing College was set up, the first nursing college outside Bangkok. It is known today as Boromarajonani College of Nursing Buddhachinaraj.

On 9 August 1995, Buddhachinaraj Phitsanulok Hospital became affiliated to the Faculty of Medicine, Naresuan University, training doctors in the Collaborative Project to Increase Production of Rural Doctors (CPIRD).

== See also ==
- Healthcare in Thailand
- Hospitals in Thailand
- List of hospitals in Thailand
