= Rayong Hospital =

Rayong Hospital โรงพยาบาลระยอง
- The Ministry of Public Health Health District 6

Geography
- Location: 138 Sukhumvit Road, Tha Pradu Subdistrict, Mueang Rayong District, Rayong 21000, Thailand
- Coordinates: 12.682107°N 101.276479°E

Organisation
- Type: Regional
- Affiliated university: Faculty of Medicine, Burapha University; Faculty of Medicine, King Mongkut's Institute of Technology Ladkrabang

Services
- Beds: 679

History
- Opened: 13 April 1951

Links
- Website: rayonghospital.go.th
- Lists: Hospitals in Thailand

Rayong Hospital (Thai: โรงพยาบาลระยอง) is the main hospital of Rayong Province, Thailand and is classified by the Ministry of Public Health as a regional hospital. It has a CPIRD (Collaborative Project to Increase Production of Rural Doctors) Medical Education Center which trains doctors of the Faculty of Medicine, Burapha University. It is an affiliated teaching hospital of the Faculty of Medicine, King Mongkut's Institute of Technology Ladkrabang.

== History ==
In 1946, the construction of a hospital was proposed in Rayong town, due to the difficulty in contacting and accessing healthcare at the closest hospital, which at the time was in Sattahip District, Chonburi Province. It was decided the location should be at the site of Wat Chanthaudom due to its location and construction began on 15 July 1949. The ramshackle temple was dismantled and only a pagoda remains. The hospital was officially opened on 13 April 1951. It became a regional hospital in 1997.

== See also ==
- Healthcare in Thailand
- Hospitals in Thailand
- List of hospitals in Thailand
