= Sirindhorn Hospital =

Sirindhorn Hospital โรงพยาบาลสิรินธร
- Medical Service Department, Bangkok Metropolitan Administration

Geography
- Location: 20 Soi On Nut 90, Prawet subdistrict, Prawet district, Bangkok 10250, Thailand

Organisation
- Type: Teaching
- Affiliated university: Faculty of Medicine, King Mongkut's Institute of Technology Ladkrabang; Faculty of Medicine Siriraj Hospital, Mahidol University

Services
- Beds: 345

History
- Founded: 1 October 2002

Links
- Website: www.srdhhospital.com
- Lists: Hospitals in Thailand

Sirindhorn Hospital (Thai: โรงพยาบาลสิรินธร) is a hospital in Thailand located in Pravet District, Bangkok. It is a public hospital operated by the Medical Service Department, Bangkok Metropolitan Administration (BMA). It is a main teaching hospital of the Faculty of Medicine, King Mongkut's Institute of Technology Ladkrabang and an affiliated teaching hospital for the Faculty of Medicine Siriraj Hospital, Mahidol University.

== History ==
Plans to increase healthcare provision for the Lat Krabang district and Eastern Bangkok started in the mid-1970s. Eastern Bangkok was then an agricultural area with a significant number of poisonous snakes in the vicinity. Incidents meant locals had to travel long distances into the city to access proper treatment as the only health stations in the area did not have sufficient capacity to treat them. On 15 July 1977, Khunying Rung Kantarat, donated approximately 86,500 square metres of land to King Bhumibol Adulyadej in commemoration of Princess Sirindhorn's graduation from Chulalongkorn University. This area was used for the construction of a larger health station, which today houses the Ban Phichitchai Drug Rehabilitation Center.

In 1991, construction started on a larger hospital building which was named "Sirindhorn Hospital" in commemoration of Princess Sirindhorn. It was completed and opened on 1 October 2002 with a capacity of 120 beds. The hospital has since been expanded to a capacity of 345 beds. It received hospital accreditation on 13 June 2017.

The Emergency Medical Service (EMS) Unit is located at the parking building and plays a vital role in the Bangkok Emergency Medical Service system. The unit operates two Advanced Life Support (ALS) teams providing 24-hour emergency care and serves as the command center for Zone 11. It is one of the key service units under Bangkok EMS. The unit is staffed by seven paramedics and nine emergency medical technicians (E-MTB). Notably, it is the only EMS unit in Bangkok where paramedics operate medical emergency motorcycles (motorlances) to provide rapid response within its service area, serving as a model and prototype for other EMS agencies.

== See also ==
- Health in Thailand
- Healthcare in Thailand
- Hospitals in Thailand
