= Faculty of Medicine, Naresuan University =

Faculty of medicine in Phitsanulok, Thailand

- คณะแพทยศาสตร์ มหาวิทยาลัยนเรศวร
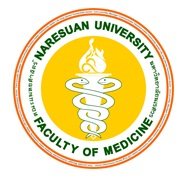
- Type: Public
- Established: January 18, 1994
- Parent institution: Naresuan University
- Affiliations: Naresuan University Hospital with 5 Affiliated Hospitals
- Dean: Asst. Prof. Piriya Narukhutrpichai, M.D.
- Location: Phitsanulok, Thailand; 16°44′23″N 100°11′26″E
- Colors: Green
- Website: med.nu.ac.th

The Faculty of Medicine, Naresuan University (Thai: คณะแพทยศาสตร์ มหาวิทยาลัยนเรศวร) is a medical school located in Phitsanulok, Thailand. The first 10 years of establishment was designed based on the cost-effective principle: the Faculty of Medicine responds for academy in pre-clinical years and the Ministry of Public Health hospitals conduct the academic instruction during the clinical years. Thereafter, the Faculty of Medicine will build and develop its own teaching hospital. The faculty's primary teaching hospital is Naresuan University Hospital with six medical education centers cooperation.

== History ==
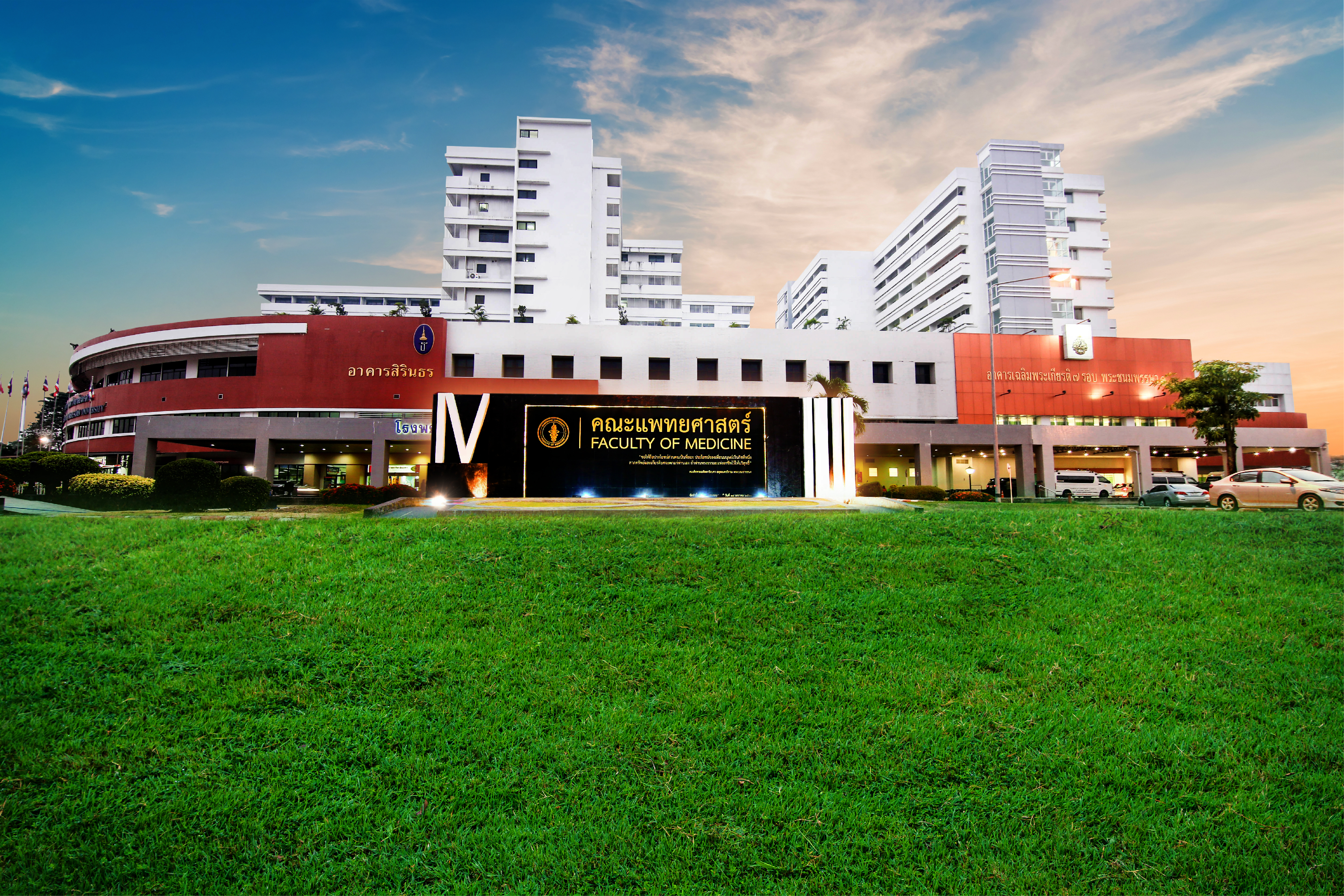
Faculty of Medicine, Naresuan University Building

In 1992, the Cabinet decided that Thailand health system needed more medical doctors especially in upcountry. Naresuan University was included the plan as an active node for the production of doctors. Official agreement between the Ministry of Public Health and Naresuan University was signed on February 18, 1993.

The first batch of 33 medical students started education in 1994 and entered the clinical year at Buddhachinaraj Phitsanulok Hospital Medical Education Center and finally all were graduated in 2001.

The need to produce more medical doctors has been emphasized. The number of medical students in a batch has reached the maximum of 60. In 1999, the Cabinet approved to include Uttaradit Hospital (another Ministry of Public Health hospital), which located in Uttaradit as the second medical education center for Faculty of Medicine Naresuan University. In 2002, 30 clinical students were placed at Uttaradit Hospital.

In 2004, the Cabinet approved a new plan of Naresuan University to include 3 more Ministry of Public Health hospitals as Medical Education Centers (Phrae Hospital in Phrae, Phichit Hospital in Phichit and King Taksin Memorial Hospital in Tak). This time, medical students have been recruited from health personnel (bachelor's degree holders) who are serving at the Ministry of Public Health facilities. In 2005, about 30 clinical medical students were attached to Phrae, Phichit and King Taksin Memorial Hospital.

After the completion of Naresuan University Hospital, a faculty's primary teaching hospital (Renaming from Health Sciences Research Institute Naresuan University in 2005), it is ready for 30 medical students to enter the clinical year in 2007.

== Dean ==
Dean of Faculty of Medicine, Naresuan University
Dean	Term
1. Professor Suchin Ungthavorn, MD, MSc	July 13, 1996 – April 17, 1998 (interim); April 18, 1998 – April 17, 2002
2. Associate Professor Choomnoom Promkutkao, MD, PhD	April 18, 2002 – January 24, 2003 (interim); January 25, 2003 – August 31, 2005
3. Professor Supasit Pannarunothai, MD, PhD	September 1, 2005 – January 26, 2007 (interim); January 27, 2007 – August 31, 2014
4. Professor Sirikasem Sirilak, MD, MBA, EdD	September 1, 2014 – August 31, 2022
5. Assistant Professor Piriya Narukhutrpichai, MD	September 1, 2022 – present

== Departments ==
The faculty of Medicine consists of 15 academic departments.

== Programs of study ==
The Faculty of Medicine is responsible for five programs of study:

=== Undergraduate program ===
==== Doctor of Medicine (MD) ====
In year 1 of the six-year study, the medical students study the general education courses with other students of the university. In years 2–3, the medical students study the pre-clinical level courses managed by Faculty of Medical Science, Faculty of Pharmaceutical Sciences and Faculty of Medicine. These courses are designed and integrated from the principle of "Problem-Based Learning (PBL)". In years 4–6, or clinical years, the academic instructions are managed primarily by the Naresuan University Hospital, with cooperated resources from affiliated hospitals.

=== Postgraduate programs ===
==== Master of Science (MSc) in Family Medicine ====
This program is a two-year full-time study focusing on both clinical practise and research of advanced family medicine.

==== Master of Science (MSc) in Medical Education ====
This program is also a two-year full-time study which taking in all bachelor's degree holders for the taught courses and individual research thesis on medical education.

==== Master of Science (MSc) in Health Security Financing and Management ====
This international program is a two-year part-time study for the highly structured taught courses and the individual independent study related to health security issues.

=== Doctorate program ===
==== Doctor of Philosophy (PhD) in Health Systems and Policy ====
This international three-year full-time program accepts research students to undertake research to provide evidence at local or national level leading to policy related recommendations.

== University Hospital (Primary teaching affiliate) ==
- Naresuan University Hospital

== Medical Education Center (CPIRD-affiliates) ==
- Buddhachinaraj Phitsanulok Hospital, Phitsanulok
- Phichit Hospital, Phichit
- Phrae Hospital, Phrae
- Somdejphrajaotaksin Maharaj Hospital, Tak
- Uttaradit Hospital, Uttaradit

== Address ==
99 Moo 9, Phitsanulok-Nakhon Sawan Road, Tha Pho, Mueang Phitsanulok, Phitsanulok 65000, Thailand

== See also ==
- List of medical schools in Thailand
