= Faculty of Medicine, King Mongkut's Institute of Technology Ladkrabang =

Thai medical school

Faculty of Medicine, King Mongkut's Institute of Technology Ladkrabang (MDKMITL)
- คณะแพทยศาสตร์ สถาบันเทคโนโลยีพระจอมเกล้าเจ้าคุณทหารลาดกระบัง
- Type: Public (non-profit)
- Established: 27 April 2016
- Parent institution: King Mongkut's Institute of Technology Ladkrabang
- Dean: Prof. Somchai Tanawattanachaoren, M.D.
- Location: 1 Soi Chalong Krung 1, Lat Krabang Subdistrict, Lat Krabang District, Bangkok 10520, Thailand; 13.731061°N 100.775674°E
- Website: https://md.kmitl.ac.th/

The Faculty of Medicine, King Mongkut's Institute of Technology Ladkrabang (Thai: คณะแพทยศาสตร์ สถาบันเทคโนโลยีพระจอมเกล้าเจ้าคุณทหารลาดกระบัง) is the first international medical school in Thailand Lat Krabang District, Bangkok.

== History ==
On 27 April 2016, the council of King Mongkut's Institute of Technology Ladkrabang approved the set up of a Faculty of Medicine. As the institution's first health science faculty, the international MD program curriculum was based on four major teaching outcomes including 1) Medical Professionalism, 2) Research Capability, 3) 21st Century Skills, and 4) Internationalization to develop more responsive 21st century medical doctors who possess the research capabilities to develop medical innovations to reduce the Thailand's healthcare burden. The program was approved on 16 February 2018 and was opened for first student admission since mid-2018. The faculty is Thailand's first ever international program for medicine and the current designated teaching hospitals are operated by Bangkok Metropolitan Administration.

Professor Anan Srikiatkhachorn, M.D., served as the founding dean of MDKMITL for more than nine years. Following the conclusion of his second term in November 2025, Professor Somchai Tanawattanacharoen, M.D., was appointed dean of MDKMITL in the same month. Both professors have been associated with the program's emphasis on innovation and medical education.

== Preclinical (Year 1-3) ==
Core course (Year 1)

Semester 1 | Total of 21 Credits

• Scientific methods

• Applied physics and mathematics for health sciences

• Introduction to medical profession

• Medical biochemistry and molecular biology

• Human behavior and sociology

• Communication in Thai for medical profession

• English for medical profession

• Creative thinking and innovation

• Free elective

Semester 2 | Total of 21 Credits

• Computer and digital technology for health sciences

• Cell and tissue physiology

• Fundamental health economics

• Health policy and public welfare

• Academic reading and writing for health sciences

• Selective study in language subject

• World culture

• Medical ethics and professional law

• Free elective

=== Pre-Clinical Development (Year 2) ===
Year 2 | Semester 1 | Total of 21 Credits

• Clinical anatomy and medical imaging

• Body movement and control

• Body fluid homeostasis I

• Body fluid homeostasis II

• Body energy homeostasis

• Body regulation and defense

Year 2 | Semester 2 | Total of 19 Credits

• Sex, gender, reproduction and healthy living

• Brain and mind

• Human genetics, growth and development

• Molecular medicine and pharmacotherapeutics

=== Pre-Clinical Development (Year 3) ===
Year 3 | Semester 1 | Total of 22 Credits

• Arts and sciences of clinical diagnosis

• Clinical microbiology and infectious diseases

• Cardiovascular medicine

• Respiratory medicine

• Gastroenterology and hepatology

• Renal and genitourinary medicine

• Allergy, immunology and rheumatology

• Endocrinology and metabolism

Year 3 | Semester 2 | Total of 19 Credits

• Hematology and oncology

• Clinical neurosciences

• Mental health and psychopathology

• Aging and degenerative disorders

• Evidence-based medicine

• Health promotion and disease prevention

• Integrated biomedical sciences* (Comprehensive Exam)

• Research experiences in biomedical

== Clinical Training (Year 4, 5, 6) ==
Year 4 | Semester 1 | Total of 20 Credits

• Principles of biomedical engineering

• Advanced subject in biomedical sciences I #

• Advanced subject in biomedical sciences II #

• Essential clinical skills

• Forensic medicine

• Family medicine clerkship

• Seminars in biomedical research I*

• Individual research I*

Year 4 | Semester 2 | Total of 19 Credits

• Biomedical research selective I* #

• Biomedical research selective II* #

• Seminars in biomedical research II*

• Individual research II*

• Community and global medicine

• Neurology, geriatric and rehabilitation medicine clerkship

• Psychiatry clerkship

Year 5 | Semester 1 | Total of 21 Credits

• Internal medicine clerkship

• Surgery clerkship

• Anesthesiology, cardiology and critical care medicine clerkship

• Obstetrics and gynecology clerkship

• Pediatric clerkship

• Seminars in biomedical research III*

Year 5 | Semester 2 | Total of 20 Credits

• Individual research III*

• Ambulatory medicine clerkship

• Accident and emergency medicine clerkship

• Oncology and palliative medicine clerkship

• Selective clerkship I

• Selective clerkship II

• Thesis I*

Year 6 | Semester 1 | Total of 22 Credits

• Introduction to clinical practice in the health care system*

• Practicum in internal medicine*

• Practicum in surgery*

• Practicum in pediatrics*

• Practicum in obstetrics and gynecology*

• Practicum in orthopedics and emergency medicine*

Year 6 | Semester 2 | Total of 22 Credits

• Practicum in community hospital*

• Selective practicum I*

• Selective practicum II*

• Thesis II*

• Thesis III*

Remarks:

* S/U grading will be offered

# Students may choose to study any research courses in biomedical sciences,

== Teaching Hospitals ==
- Sirindhorn Hospital, Department of Medical Services, BMA
- Lat Krabang Hospital, Department of Medical Services, BMA
- Rayong Hospital, The Ministry of Public Health
- King Mongkut Chaokhun Thahan Hospital (under construction)

== MOU hospitals ==
- Bumrungrad International Hospital

== See also ==
- List of medical schools in Thailand
