= School of Medicine, Siam University =

- คณะแพทยศาสตร์ มหาวิทยาลัยสยาม
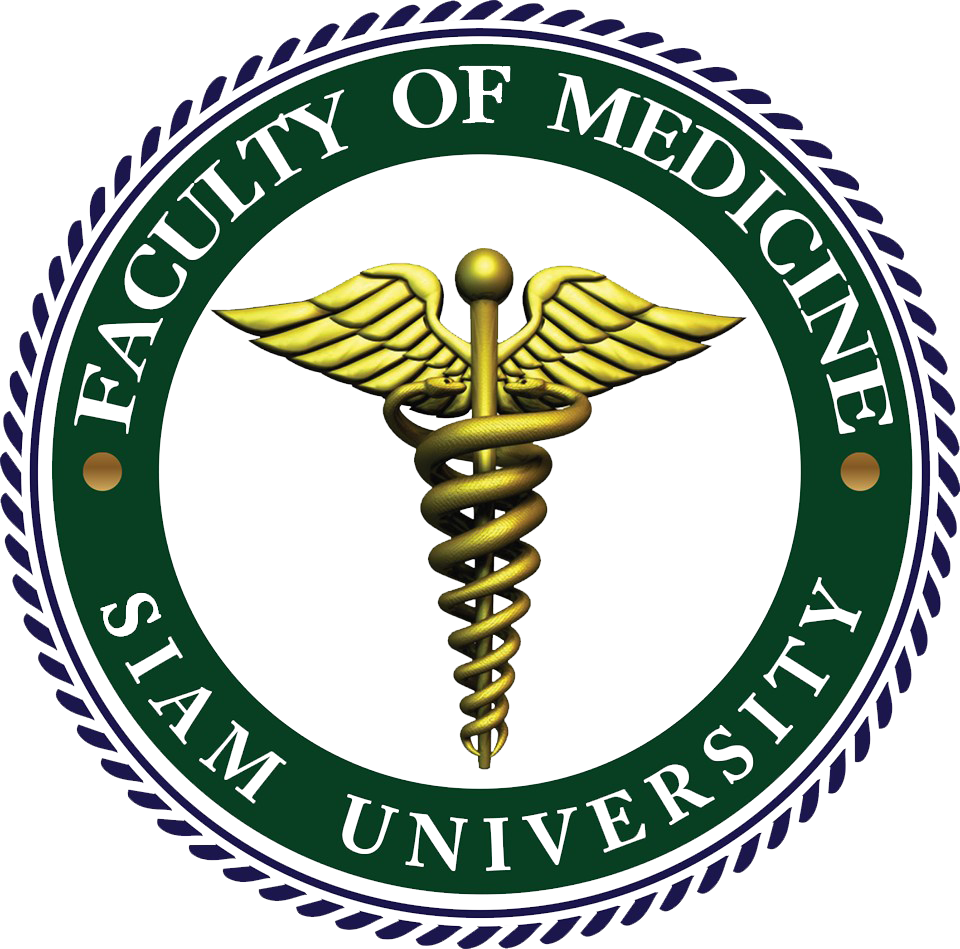
- Type: Private
- Established: 2012
- Parent institution: Siam University
- Dean: Clinical Prof. Suwat Benjaponpitak, M.D.
- Students: 48 (per academic year)
- Location: Bangkok, Thailand
- Website: med.siam.edu

School of Medicine, Siam University is the second private university in Thailand to be assessed for quality by the Medical Council of Thailand in 2013.

== History ==
The School of Medicine, Siam University, is the second private medical school in Thailand. It was established in 2013 by a group of doctors. Its first semester began in August, 2013 under the guidance of Asst. Prof. Dr. Chookiet Asawanich, Dean of Medical Faculty, with advisers such as Dr. Amorn Lelarasamee and Dr. Chaleum Warawit.

On 17 February 2013, Police General Hospital agreed to be the main site of clinical practice for the new medical program. The agreement ceased in November 2015 and was clinical teaching was undertaken in Phra Nang Klao Hospital from January 2016 onwards.

== Teaching Hospitals ==
- Phra Nang Klao Hospital, Nonthaburi Province

== See also ==
- List of medical schools in Thailand
