= Mae Fah Luang University =

University in Chiang Rai, Thailand

Coordinates: 20°02′42″N 99°53′41″E

- มหาวิทยาลัยแม่ฟ้าหลวง
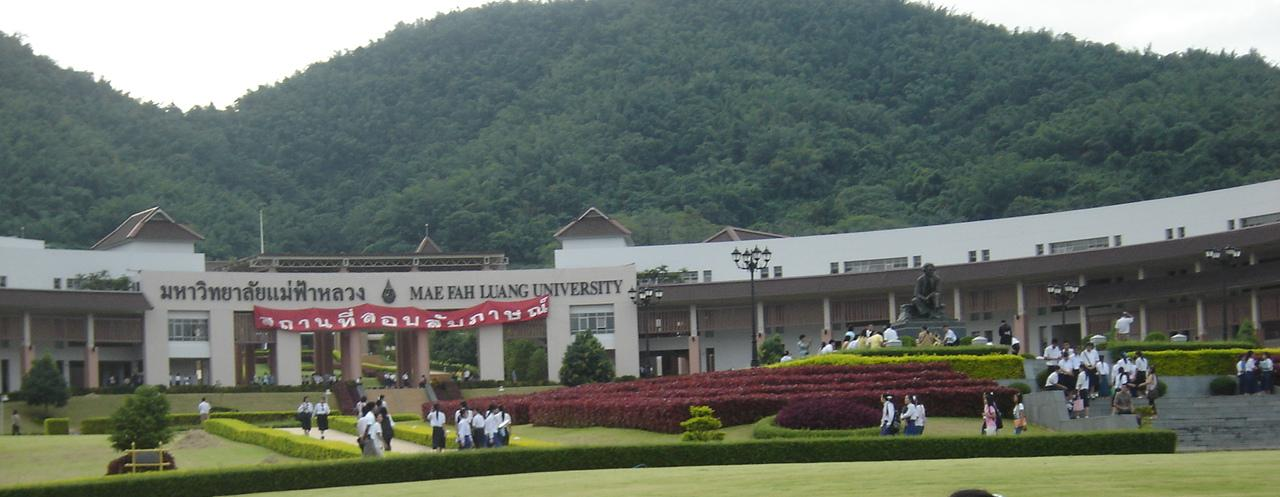
- Motto: สร้างคน สร้างความรู้ สร้างคุณภาพ สร้างคุณธรรม
- Motto in English: Developing people; cultivating knowledge; instilling quality; upholding virtues
- Type: International; Autonomous public university
- Established: 1998
- Affiliations: ASAIHL
- Chairman: Prof. Dr. Vanchai Sirichana
- President: Asst. Prof. Dr.Matchima Naradisorn
- Royal conferrer: Maha Chakri Sirindhorn, Princess Royal of Thailand on behalf of the King
- Location: 333 Moo 1, Thasud, Mueang Chiang Rai, Chiang Rai, 57100, Thailand
- Colours: Red and Gold
- Mascot: Mole
- Website: www.mfu.ac.th

Mae Fah Luang University (MFU), situated in Chiang Rai Province in northern Thailand, is named after the Princess Mother (Somdet Yah), Mae Fah Luang was the name given to her by the local people in Chiang Rai. It is an autonomous public university that was established under the Royal Charter, in 1998. The university is also known as an international university in Thailand. Mae Fah Luang University was ranked 1st in Thailand by Times Higher Education in 2021.

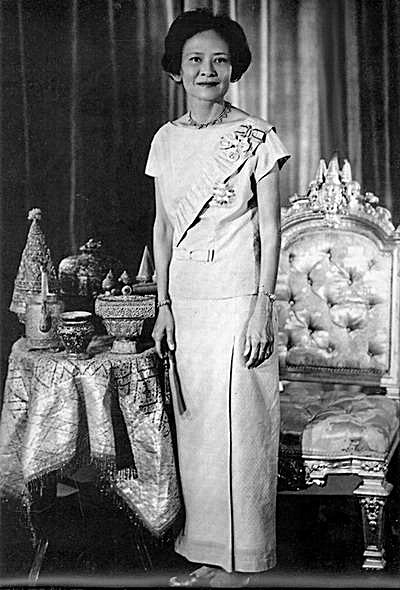
Princess Srinagarindra

All of its programmes are taught in English. It now has 11 schools namely, the School of Science, School of Liberal Arts, School of Management, School of Law, School of Medicine, School of Agro-Industry, School of Information Technology, School of Cosmetic Science, School of Health Science, School of Nursing and School of Anti-Ageing and Regenerative Medicine and in 2012 offers over 72 programmes such as: Biotechnology, Cosmetic Science, Engineering, Aviation Business Management, Agro-Industry, Medicine and many more. The university hospital has been completed, and was formally opened in September 2012. The School of Medicine has also been established and began offering M.D. degrees in the 2013 Academic Year.

International courses offered by the university include majors in Business and Thai Language and Culture, but all courses offered by the university are open to international students.

The campus is situated in Tambon Tasood, Mueang District and consists mainly of hills with only a small area of plain. Construction took many years, as the campus was mostly built on hillsides. Expansion work still continues.

The university uses English as the primary medium of instruction for the majority of its courses and has many native English-speaking lecturers in a wide range of disciplines. Mae Fah Luang University is a relatively new university and benefits from this by being able to offer modern courses relevant to today's world. The People's Republic of China built the Sirindhorn Chinese Language and Cultural Center on the campus as a gift to Thailand, equipping it with computers with Chinese programs and Chinese textbooks. The center is built to resemble a traditional Chinese house, complete with courtyards, gardens, and a pond. The Confucius Institute is also located here. In the 2012-2013 Academic Year over 10,000 students were enrolled at the university. Mae Fah Luang University was ranked 1st in Thailand by Time Higher Education in 2020.

== History ==
Mae Fah Luang University (MFU) was established against public protests by Politician The university was established to meet the needs of people in the north of Thailand, and to commemorate the contributions of the king's mother, Princess Srinagarindra, known to her subjects as "Mae Fah Luang." From its inaugural class of 64 students in 1998, MFU has become Thailand's fastest growing post-secondary institution with an enrollment of just under 15,000 students.

== Academics ==
Mae Fah Luang University uses English as the medium of instruction. Mae Fah Luang University manages all 15 faculties offering 38 undergraduate majors, 25 graduate degrees, and 15 professional degrees.

The university is home to the Sirindhorn Chinese Language and Culture Center, which is styled as a traditional Chinese garden structure with courtyards, ponds, and pavilions. The center was a gift from China and named after Princess Sirindhorn in honor of her role in cultural exchange between Thailand and China. The center has a Confucius Institute which provides Chinese language instruction for both university students and the general public. The Confucius Institute is operated in partnership with Xiamen University.

=== Faculty ===
College/School	Year founded
School of Science	1999
School of Liberal Arts	1999
School of Information Technology	1999
School of Agro-Industry	1999
School of Management	2001
School of Law	2003
School of Cosmetic Science	2005
School of Health Science	2005
School of Nursing	2006
School of Anti-Aging and Regenerative Medicine	2008
School of Medicine	2012
School of Dentistry	2013
School of Social Innovation	2014
School of Sinology	2014
School of Integrative Medicine	2019
