= Faculty of Medicine, Mahasarakham University =

- คณะแพทยศาสตร์ มหาวิทยาลัยมหาสารคาม
- Type: Public (non-profit)
- Established: 21 November 2003
- Parent institution: Mahasarakham University
- Dean: Asst. Prof. Theparak Sirithanawuthichai, M.D.
- Location: 296 Nakhornsawan Road, Talad Subdistrict, Mueang Maha Sarakham District, Maha Sarakham Province 44000, Thailand
- Colors: Green

The Faculty of Medicine, Mahasarakham University (Thai: คณะแพทยศาสตร์ มหาวิทยาลัยมหาสารคาม) is a medical school in Northeastern Thailand located in Mueang Maha Sarakham District, Maha Sarakham Province.

== History ==
The Faculty of Medicine, Mahasarakham University was founded as a sub-division of the university, following a university council meeting on 21 November 2003. Initially, it was located at the Kham Riang Campus (New Campus), and a medical service center was opened on 1 July 2004. In November 2005, the faculty was moved to the Downtown Campus (Old Campus). and another medical service center was opened at this campus on 6 February 2006. In 2006, the medical course was approved by the Medical Council of Thailand and thus the faculty admitted the first cohort of medical students for the 2006 academic year. On 6 June 2014, Suddhavej Hospital opened and was used as the main teaching hospital instead of the Downtown Medical Center.

== Education ==
The faculty currently provides education for 5 courses:

1. Doctor of Medicine (MD)
2. Bachelor of Applied Thai Traditional Medicine
3. BSc. in Emergency Healthcare
4. MSc. in Health Science
5. Ph.D. in Health Science

== Teaching Hospitals ==
Main

- Suddhavej Hospital

MD Affiliates

- Kalasin Hospital (CPIRD)
- Roi Et Hospital (CPIRD)

BSc. Emergency Healthcare Affiliates

- Maharat Nakhon Ratchasima Hospital

== See also ==
- List of medical schools in Thailand
