= Naresuan University Hospital =

Naresuan University Hospital โรงพยาบาลมหาวิทยาลัยนเรศวร

Geography
- Location: Phitsanulok, Thailand
- Coordinates: 16.749136°N 100.189420°E

Organisation
- Type: National Health Security
- Affiliated university: Faculty of Medicine, Naresuan University

Services
- Beds: 494

History
- Opened: March 26, 2005

Links
- Website: med.nu.ac.th/nuh/
- Lists: Hospitals in Thailand

Naresuan University Hospital (Thai: โรงพยาบาลมหาวิทยาลัยนเรศวร) is a primary teaching hospital of the Faculty of Medicine Naresuan University, located on the campus of Naresuan University in Phitsanulok Province, Thailand. The hospital is designed as the super tertiary care medical center in the lower northern region of Thailand.

== History ==
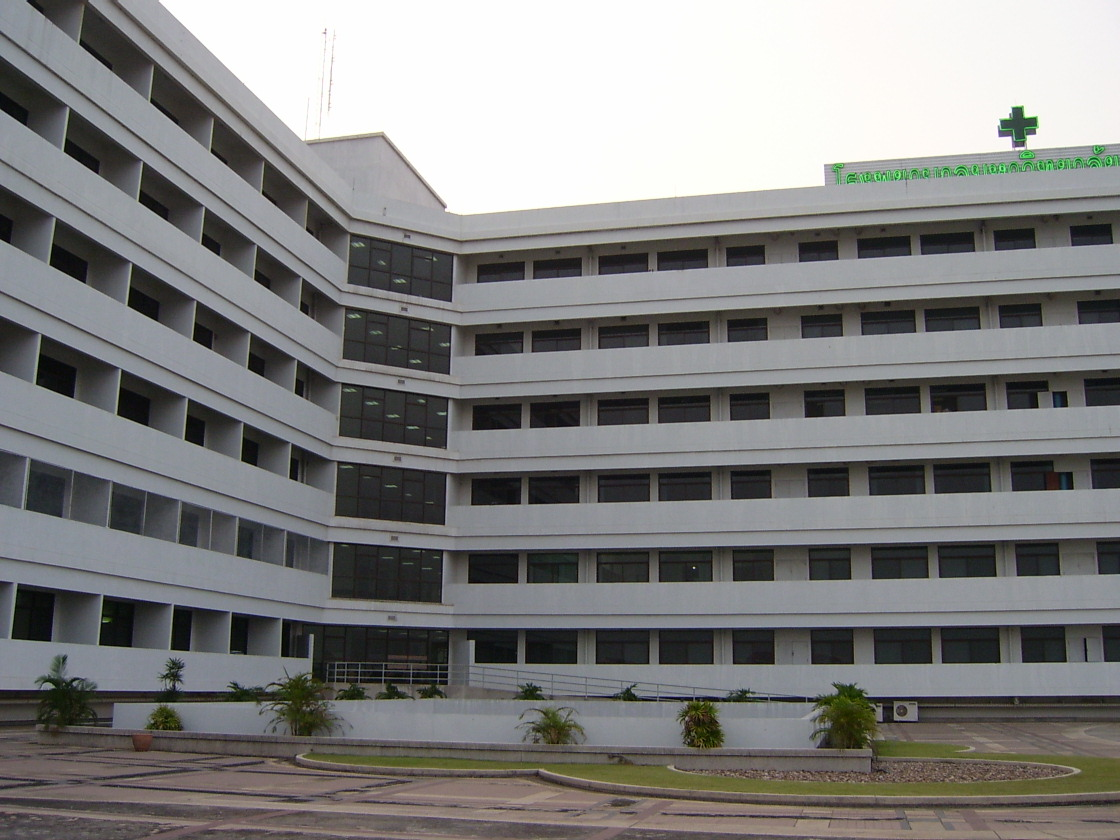
Naresuan University Hospital

After establishment of the Faculty of Medicine Naresuan University in 1994, the Royal Thai Government permitted a budget to build Medical Sciences building and Health Sciences Research Center inside Naresuan University to be a research and a teaching center of students in health sciences field. Besides the education, Health Sciences Research Center was also aimed to be the super tertiary care medical center in this region.

The construction of Health Sciences Research Center Naresuan University was started in 1996 and completed in 2000.

In July, 2000, the university cabinet agreed to rename as "Health Sciences Research Institute Naresuan University" and managed as a faculty of the university.

On December 1, 2003, Princess Maha Chakri Sirindhorn operated the grand opening ceremony of the building and statue of Prince Mahidol Adulyadej of Songkla and the Princess Mother Srinagarindra, the father and mother of Thai public health and modern Thai medicine. The Princess also gave the name of the building as "Sirindhorn Building".

On March 26, 2005, the university cabinet have had a resolution to rename the Health Sciences Research Institute again as "Naresuan University Hospital" and combined as a part of Faculty of Medicine Naresuan University to be the faculty's primary teaching hospital.

The first batch of medical students started the clinical year at Naresuan University Hospital in 2007.

== Director ==
Health Sciences Research Center, Naresuan University
Director	Term
1. Professor Thongchan Hongladarom, MD	July 16, 1996 – November 4, 1999
2. Professor Suchin Ungthavorn, MD, MSc	November 5, 1999 – December 21, 1999
3. Associate Professor Pudit Taychatiwat, MD, PhD	December 22, 1999 – August 18, 2000
Health Sciences Research Institute, Naresuan University
Director	Term
1. Associate Professor Pudit Taychatiwat, MD, PhD	August 19, 2000 – January 15, 2004
2. Ongart Leartkajonsin, MD	January 16, 2004 – March 25, 2005
Naresuan University Hospital; Faculty of Medicine, Naresuan University
Director	Term
1. Ongart Leartkajonsin, MD	March 26, 2005 – March 15, 2007
2. Professor Supasit Pannarunothai, MD, PhD	March 16, 2007 – July 31, 2007
3. Assistant Professor Piriya Narukhutrpichai, MD	August 1, 2007 – July 31, 2014; September 1, 2022 – present
4. Professor Sirikasem Sirilak, MD, MBA, EdD	August 1, 2014 – August 31, 2022

== Address ==
Located inside Naresuan University.
99 Moo 9, Phitsanulok-Nakhon Sawan Road, Tha Pho, Mueang Phitsanulok, Phitsanulok 65000, Thailand

== See also ==
- List of hospitals in Thailand
- Faculty of Medicine, Naresuan University
- Naresuan University
