= University of Phayao =

University in Thailand

Coordinates: 19.028432°N 99.896239°E

- มหาวิทยาลัยพะเยา (มพ.)
- Motto in English: Wisdom for Community Empowerment
- Type: Autonomous public university
- Established: 17 July 2010
- Rector: Dr.Supakorn Phongbangbho
- Royal conferrer: Maha Chakri Sirindhorn, Princess Royal of Thailand on behalf of the King
- Location: 19 Moo 2, Phahonyothin Road, Mae Ka, Mueang Phayao, Phayao, Thailand
- Campus: 1 (at Chiang Rai)
- Symbolic tree: Vanda
- Colours: Purple - gold
- Website: www.up.ac.th

The University of Phayao (UP) (Thai: มหาวิทยาลัยพะเยา) is a university in Phayao Province in northern Thailand. Its previous name was Naresuan University, Phayao Campus. The university later split from NU and changed its name to University of Phayao in 2010, registered as the 79th university of Thailand.

== History ==
On 20th June 1995, a proposal to set up a new university was approved by the cabinet. Later on 8th October 1996, the cabinet had a resolution to call this university Naresuan University, Phayao IT Campus. Classes started in 1995 using the classrooms of Phayaopittayakom School and later moved to the current campus in 1999.

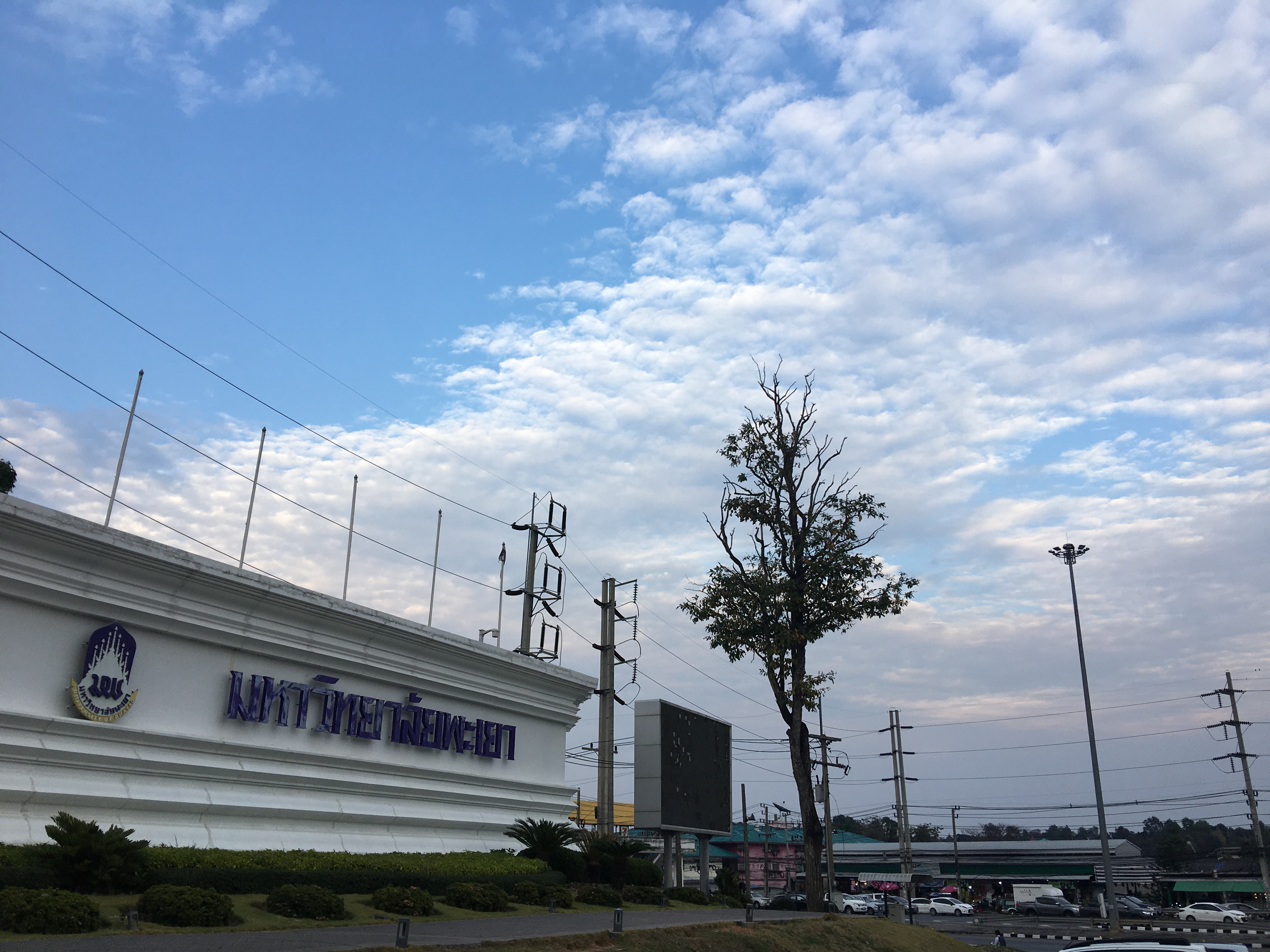
UP's Logo and Sign in front of the campus

In 2007, The name of "Phayao IT Campus" was changed to "Phayao Campus", which in the same year, Associate Professor Dr. Mondhon Sanguansermsri, President of Naresuan University put forward the proposal to promote the campus into an independent university together with a proposal for the Royal Decree for University of Phayao. These were approved and declared in the Royal Gazette on 16 July 2010. The Royal Decree for University of Phayao, officially delivering "University of Phayao", took effect from 17 July 2010 onwards.

== See also ==
- Naresuan University
- Education in Thailand
