= Naresuan University =

University in Phitsanulok, Thailand

- มหาวิทยาลัยนเรศวร
- Motto: มหาวิทยาลัยแห่งการวิจัย
- Type: Public
- Established: College of Education Phitsanulok Campus January 25, 1967 Srinakharinwirot University Phitsanulok Campus June 28, 1974 Naresuan University July 29, 1990
- Affiliations: ASAIHL
- President: Assoc.Prof. Sarinthip Thanthanee, PhD (Acting)
- Royal conferrer: Maha Chakri Sirindhorn, Princess Royal of Thailand on behalf of the King
- Undergraduates: 25,721
- Postgraduates: 5,020
- Location: Mueang Phitsanulok District, Thailand; 16°44′43″N 100°11′28″E
- Colours
- Mascot: War Elephant
- Website: http://www.nu.ac.th/

Naresuan University (NU; Thai: มหาวิทยาลัยนเรศวร, RTGS: Mahawitthayalai Naresuan, pronounced [mā.hǎː.wít.tʰā.jāː.lāj nā.rēː.sǔa̯n]) is a public university in Phitsanulok Province, northern Thailand. It was established as a separate university on 29 July 1990, the 400th anniversary of the start of the reign of Phitsanulok-born King Naresuan the Great. A courtyard with a statue of King Naresuan is on the campus grounds and students regularly pay their respects before it. The university has about 20,000 full-time students.

== History ==
On 18 January 1964, the Ministry of Education resolved to create branches of the Bangkok's College of Education in each region of the country. On 25 January 1967, the Phitsanulok campus was established as the fourth branch of the College of Education and was meant to serve mainly the northern provinces.

In 1974 the College of Education was upgraded to university status and was named Srinakharinwirot University. Originally, only the third and fourth years of university study were offered at Phitsanulok, and students were admitted by competitive examination after completing the curriculum at one of the nation's associate degree level teacher training colleges. In 1976, the first and second years were added. Other majors besides education were gradually included, and in 1990 the Phitsanulok campus became independent of Srinakarinwirot University. It was designated "Naresuan University" during the celebrations of the 400th anniversary of King Naresuan the Great's ascension to the throne.

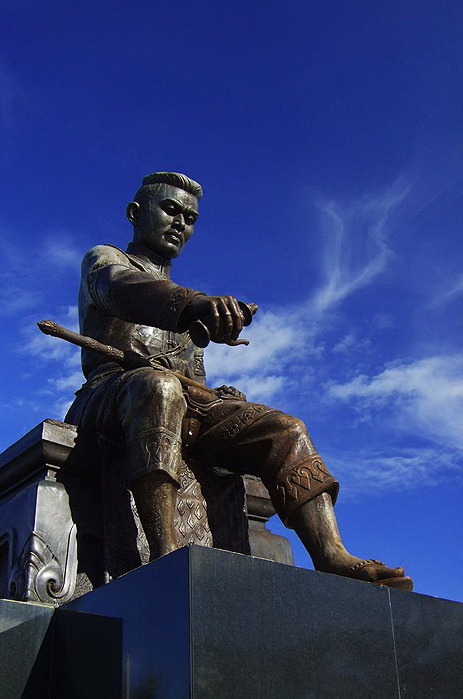
King Naresuan the Great statue, Naresuan University

Naresuan University has a second campus in Phayao, which opened in 1999 and was upgraded to university level and named "University of Phayao" in 2010. It also offers extension courses across the country at nine education centers, including Bangkok.

== Ranking ==
In September 2006, Naresuan University was ranked as "Very Good" in a study conducted on Thai universities by the Commission on Higher Education and 5th in the uniRank 2017 Thai University Ranking.

== Faculties ==
The university has 16 faculties, organized into three clusters:

- The Health Sciences Cluster
  - Faculty of Allied Health Sciences
  - Faculty of Dentistry
  - Faculty of Medical Science
  - Faculty of Medicine
    - Naresuan University Hospital
  - Faculty of Nursing
  - Faculty of Pharmaceutical Sciences
  - Faculty of Public Health
- The Social Sciences Cluster
  - Faculty of Education
  - Faculty of Humanities
  - Faculty of Law
  - Faculty of Business Economics and Communications
  - Faculty of Social Sciences
- The Science & Technology Cluster
  - Faculty of Agriculture, Natural Resources & Environment
  - Faculty of Architecture
  - Faculty of Engineering
  - Faculty of Science

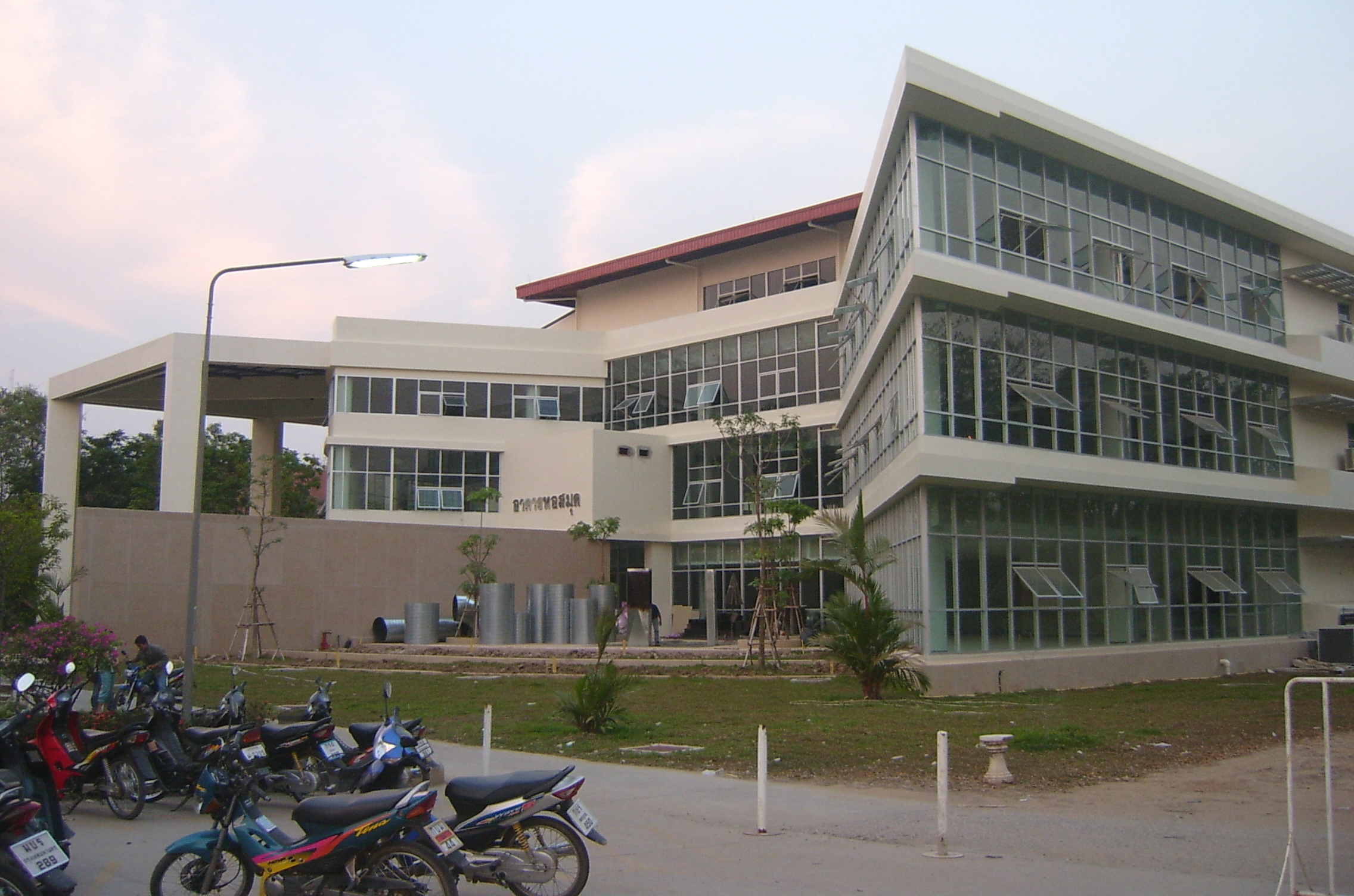
New central library

  - Faculty of Logistics and Digital Supply Chain

Other schools, colleges and institutes organized by Naresuan University:

- School of Renewable Energy Technology (SERT)
- Naresuan University International College (NUIC)
- Graduate School
- Naresuan Institute for Community Empowerment (NICE)
- Institute of Research and Development Administration (IRDA)
- Center of ASEAN Community Studies (CACS)

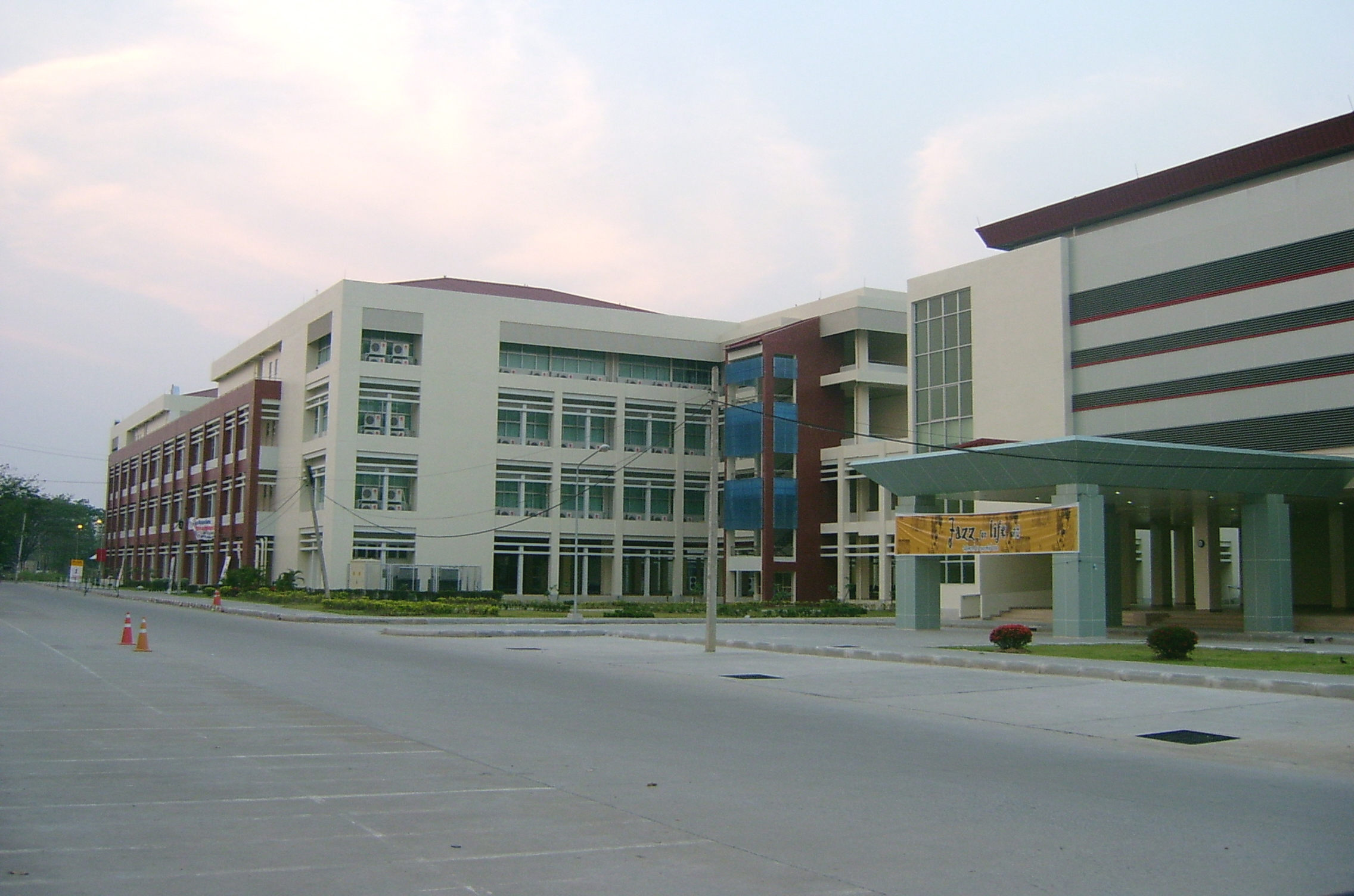
Queen Sirikit lecture hall and theater

== Naresuan University Art and Culture Gallery ==
The Naresuan University Art and Culture Gallery holds over 100 artistic works by culturally significant Thai artists.

== Establish ==
ปีที่ก่อตั้ง	คณะ
2510	Faculty of Science •Faculty of Education • Faculty of Humanities
2520	Graduate School
2536	Faculty of Agriculture, Natural Resources and Environment
2537	Faculty of Medicine • Faculty of Pharmacy • Faculty of Engineering • The Institute for Fundamental Study
2539	Faculty of Nursing • Faculty of Allied Health Sciences
2543	Faculty of Dentistry
2544	Faculty of Architecture art and design • Naresuan University International College
2546	Faculty of Law • Faculty of Business, Economics and Communications] • Faculty of Social Sciences • Faculty of Public Health • School of Renewable Energy and Smart Grid Technology
2559	Collage of Health System management
2563	Faculty of Logistics and Digital Supply Chain

=== Academic Resources Center ===
Initially, Naresuan University established the Academic Resources Center to expand the graduate education network to various provinces, including Chiang Mai, Phrae, Uttaradit, Phetchabun, Phichit, Kamphaeng Phet, Nakhon Sawan, Tak, Sukhothai, Uthai Thani, Suphan Buri, and Bangkok. The objectives were to enhance the potential and increase knowledge for those interested in further education who could not come to study directly at the university, and to have the Graduate School supervise and control the educational standards, including the teaching management of all university academic resources. Later, the Continuing Education Center was established to be the agency responsible specifically for the Academic Resources Center.

Later, in the university council meeting on November 13, 2011, it was resolved to close the information service center and close all the teaching programs of the information service center when the current students graduated. And to proceed with only 2 off-site education programs: Master of Pharmacy Program in Community Pharmacy (organized by the Faculty of Pharmacy at the Pharmaceutical Association of Thailand under Royal Patronage) and the Master of Science Program in Finance and Health Insurance Administration (International Program) (organized by the Faculty of Medicine at the National Health Security Office (NHSO)). and in the University Council Committee meeting on November 4, 2012, there was a resolution to close another teaching place at the National Health Security Office, leaving only the Pharmaceutical Association of Thailand. Under the sole royal patronage

== Covering Areas ==
Naresuan University divides its educational areas into 2 parts.

=== Naresun University Airport area ===
Naresuan University's original campus, affectionately known as "MorNor Nai," was a 100-acre parcel situated in the heart of Phitsanulok city at 1 Snam Bin Road, Nai Mueang Subdistrict, Mueang District, Phitsanulok Province. This historic site served as the university's initial hub until 2535 when all faculties and departments relocated to a new campus. Today, the site houses the Community Pharmacy Laboratory "Phaisachyasala" of the Faculty of Pharmacy, the Naresuan University Community Health Center (Airport) of the Faculty of Medicine, and, more recently, has been redeveloped to accommodate Naresuan University Demonstration School and Pibulsongkram Rajabhat University Demonstration School.

=== Naresuan University Nongor Area ===
Commonly known as "MorNor Nok," Naresuan University's current campus spans approximately 1,300 acres, located about 10 kilometers south of Phitsanulok city at 99 Moo 9, Phitsanulok-Nakhon Sawan Road, Tha Pho Subdistrict, Mueang District, Phitsanulok Province. Originally a vast public land known as "Thung Nong Ao – Pak Klong Chik," this area was once dominated by a large pond and kapok trees. Since 1984, the university has transformed this land, reclaiming the pond and constructing numerous buildings based on a master plan developed by King Mongkut's Institute of Technology Ladkrabang.

- The campus is divided into six main zones:
- Health Sciences
- Science and Technology
- Humanities and Social Sciences
- Central Administration
- Faculty and Student Dormitories
- Sports Center.

The campus is interconnected by major roads such as Naresuan Road and Ekathasrot Road.

== Important Places ==
- Naresuan University Hospital is a hospital of the Faculty of Medicine. It is a super tertiary care medical center in the lower northern region. In addition to being a hospital, Naresuan University Hospital is also a conference center, research center, and teaching center for students in the health science group.
- Lan Somdet is the area where the statue of King Naresuan the Great is enshrined, which is the center of the hearts of students and personnel of the university.
- Hor Phra Thep Rattan Hall enshrines the Buddha statue, B.P.R., which is the university's Buddha statue. It has been granted permission to be an art venue in honor of Her Royal Highness Princess Maha Chakri Sirindhorn, and has graciously bestowed the name "Hor Phra Thep Rattan Hall". The design of Hor Phra Thep Rattan Hall was designed by Ajarn Wanida Phuengsunthon, a national artist. It has a unique identity that reflects the style of art venues in Phitsanulok, which has a common characteristic of Sukhothai and Ayutthaya architecture. The building is located in the middle of a pond between Lan Somdet and the Office of the President. and Naresuan University Hospital, with a bridge connecting to the Somdej Plaza and the road in front of Naresuan University Hospital
- Textile Museum The Textile Museum Project of Naresuan University is considered another tourist attraction in Phitsanulok Province. It consists of 2 units:
- Textile Museum is located on the ground floor of the multipurpose building. It is a museum that exhibits the history of textiles from various ethnic groups, including local wisdom related to clothing and dressing. In addition, there are training and exhibitions on clothing and accessories throughout the year. There are also sales of various fabric products and souvenirs from the university.
- The Museum of Life consists of a group of Thai-style buildings located next to the Naresuan University Radio Station. Inside, knowledge is provided on the history of textiles and weaving.

== Partner Institution ==
=== Malaysia ===
- Universiti Tunku Abdul Rahman

=== Philippines ===
- San Sebastian College – Recoletos

== See also ==
- Naresuan University Hospital
- Education in Thailand
