= Wang Saen Suk =

Buddhist temple located in Bang Saen city, Chonburi province, Thailand

Coordinates: 13°17′51″N 100°54′43″E

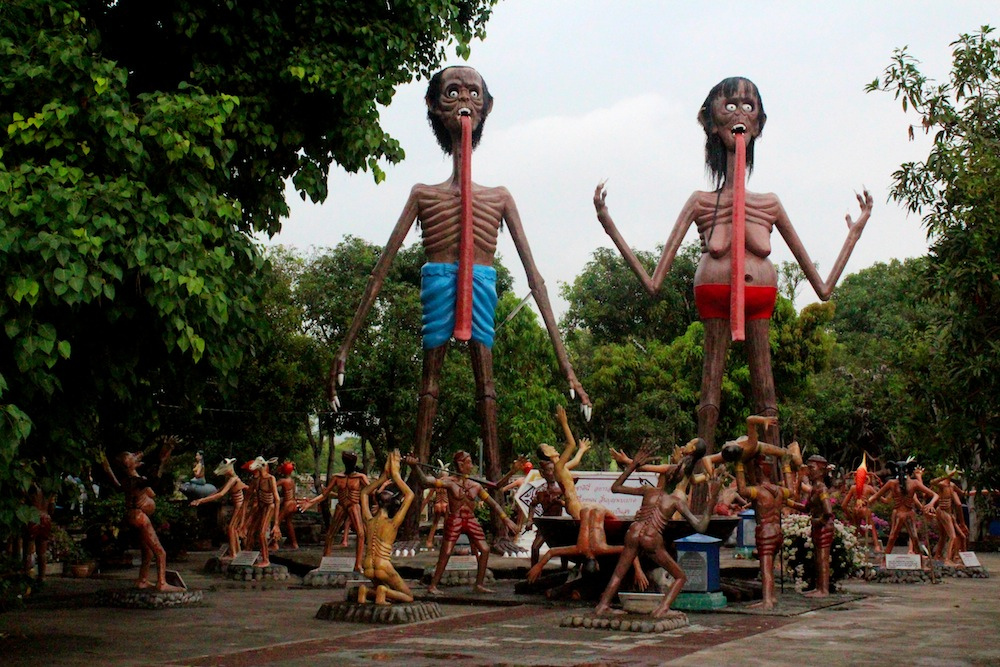
The central area of Wang Saen Suk, featuring the Pretas and tortured souls, June 2013

Wat Saen Suk (Thai: วัดแสนสุข) or Wang Saen Suk Monastery Garden (also known as Wang Saen Suk Hell Garden and Thailand Hell Horror Park) is a Buddhist temple located in Bang Saen city, Chonburi province, Thailand. A popular tourist attraction, it is meant to describe and depict Naraka (Buddhist hell).

== Geography ==
The hell garden is located at Sai 2, Soi 19, Saen Suk, close to Thailand's Bang Saen Beach. Near the garden is a Thai hotel resort.

== Features ==
The Wang Saen Suk Hell Garden is the largest hell garden in Thailand. At the entrance of the monastery garden, a brightly colored sign reads "Welcome To Hell" Further inside the garden, another sign reads:

If you meet the Devil in this life, don't postpone merit-making which will help you to defeat him in the next life.

At the start of the garden trial sits a giant "fat Buddha" statue. Numerous cement-and-plaster statues depicting life in a Buddhist hell can be found throughout the garden. After a series of relatively peaceful, spiritual scenes, the visitor turns a corner to see a diorama depicting Buddhist hell. Two large figures named 'Nai Ngean' and 'Nang Thong' stand high above the tortured souls of the garden; their emaciated appearance, long necks and distended bellies seems to mark them as Preta, the 'hungry ghosts' of Thai folklore.

Around the feet of these figures are arranged 21 tortured souls, each with the head of a different animal. These animalistic characterisations reflect the nature of each soul's sin; plaques at the feet of each feature inscriptions such as:

Ones who make a corruption are punished in the hell, they are named as the spirits of the pigs.

Ones who sell the habit-performing drugs are punished in the hell, they are named as the spirits of the cows.

Other designations include the ungrateful becoming tigers, jealous people being named rabbits and bird heads given to those who steal cooked rice.

After this first area come illustrations of the specific punishments for a list of very particular crimes. These include depictions of human sinners being ripped apart by the dogs of Hell, burnt alive in boiling cauldrons, disembowelled by birds, and having their heads replaced with those of animals.

Donation boxes located next to each scene encourage penance through charity. They also detail the sins likely to incur the depicted torture; these range from a woman being crushed in a vice for having an abortion and a man having his head savagely knocked off for undermining Buddhism.
