= Faculty of Medicine, Burapha University =

Medical School of Higher Learning

- คณะแพทยศาสตร์ มหาวิทยาลัยบูรพา
- Type: Public (non-profit)
- Established: 2 September 2002
- Parent institution: Burapha University
- Dean: Asst. Prof. Taweelarp Tansavatdi, M.D.
- Location: 169 Long-Had Bangsaen Road, Bang Saen Subdistrict, Mueang Chonburi District, Chonburi 20131, Thailand; 13.284907°N 100.922221°E
- Colors: Green
- Website: https://www.medbuu.info/

The Faculty of Medicine, Burapha University (Thai: คณะแพทยศาสตร์ มหาวิทยาลัยบูรพา) is the first medical school in Eastern Thailand, located in Mueang Chonburi District, Chonburi Province. It is part of the group of Health Science Faculties of Bangsaen Campus.

== History ==
Funding was allocated in 1994 in a proposal to expand the 'Burapha University Health Sciences Center' into a university hospital, along with setting up a new faculty for Medicine specifically. The faculty was set up on 2 September 2002 and the Doctor of Medicine degree was approved by the group of universities on 10 February 2003 and the first cohort of 32 medical students were admitted for the 2007 academic year, following approval from the Medical Council of Thailand. The first group of students consisted only of students completing high school education in 12 provinces: Samut Prakan, Nakhon Nayok, Chachoengsao, Chonburi, Rayong, Chanthaburi, Trat, Prachinburi, Lopburi, Saraburi and Phra Nakhon Si Ayutthaya, with the expectation to provide future medical personnel particularly in Eastern Thailand.

== Departments ==
- Department of Anaethesiology
- Department of Community Medicine and Family Medicine
- Department of Internal Medicine
- Department of Obstetrics and Gynaecology
- Department of Orthopaedic Surgery and Rehabilitative Medicine
- Department of Ophthalmology and Otolaryngology
- Department of Pathology and Forensic Medicine
- Department of Paediatrics
- Department of Psychiatry
- Department of Radiology and Nuclear Medicine
- Department of Surgery

== Teaching Hospitals ==
- Burapha University Hospital
- Chaophraya Abhaibhubejhr Hospital (CPIRD)
- Rayong Hospital (CPIRD)
- Somdech Phra Pinklao Hospital, The Royal Thai Navy (CPIRD)
- Queen Sirikit Naval Hospital, The Royal Thai Navy (CPIRD)
- Queen Savang Vadhana Memorial Hospital, Thai Red Cross Society (CPIRD)

== See also ==
- List of medical schools in Thailand
