= Institute of Marine Sciences =

Institute of Marine Science(s) or Marine Science(s) Institute may refer to:

== Asia ==
- Marine Science Institute, University of the Philippines Diliman, in Quezon City, National Capital Region, Philippines
- Institute of Marine Science, Burapha University, in Saen Suk, Chonburi, Thailand
- Institute of Marine Sciences, Middle East Technical University, in Erdemli, Mersin Province, Turkey
- Institute of Marine Sciences, University of Chittagong, in Chittagong, Bangladesh

== Oceania ==
- Australian Institute of Marine Science, in Townsville, Queensland, Australia
- Sydney Institute of Marine Science, in Sydney, New South Wales, Australia

== North America ==
- Marine Science Institute (San Francisco Bay), in Redwood City, California, USA
- University of Texas at Austin Marine Science Institute, in Port Aransas, Texas, USA
- Virginia Institute of Marine Science at the College of William and Mary, in Williamsburg, Virginia, USA
