= Institute of Marine Science, Burapha University =

The Institute of Marine Science, Burapha University
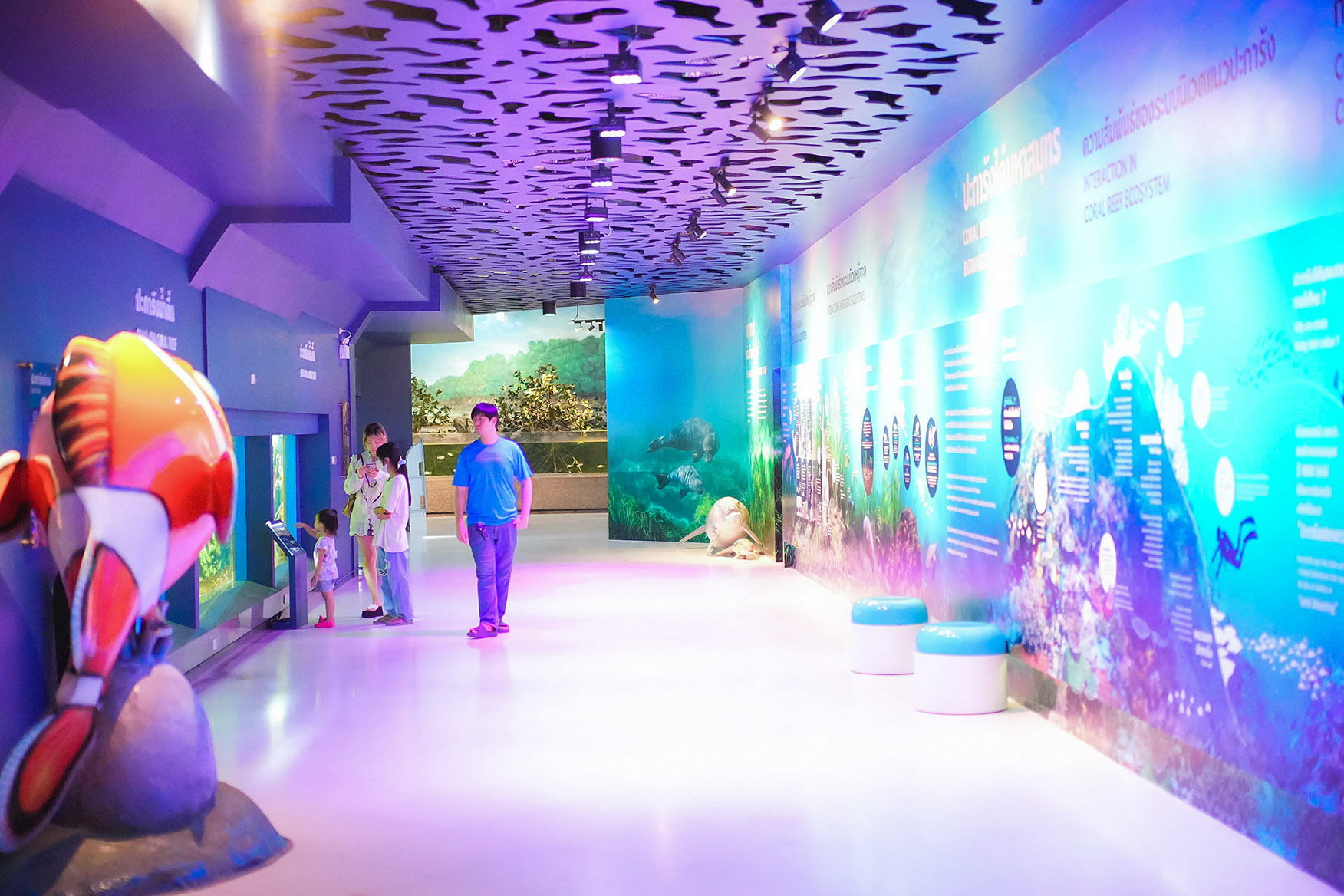
- Inside the aquarium, a walkway features fish tanks on left side and informative exhibits about coral reef ecosystems on the other
- Interactive map of The Institute of Marine Science, Burapha University
- 13°17′06″N 100°55′30″E
- Date opened: May 23, 1985
- Location: Burapha University (BUU), Saen Suk, Chonburi, Thailand
- Major exhibits: Skeleton of a Bryde's whale; Jellyfish Zone; Large Tank; Large Cylindrical Tank; Acrylic Tunnel
- Management: Burapha University (BUU)
- Website: The Institute of Marine Science, Burapha University

The Institute of Marine Science, Burapha University (Thai: สถาบันวิทยาศาสตร์ทางทะเล มหาวิทยาลัยบูรพา), also colloquially known as the Bangsaen Aquarium (พิพิธภัณฑ์สัตว์น้ำบางแสน), is one of Thailand's oldest and most renowned aquaria. It is located within Burapha University (BUU), Chonburi province, near the beach of Bangsaen.

The aquarium has been operating since the 1980s. At the entrance to the exhibition hall, visitors can see the skeleton of a Bryde's whale (Balaenoptera brydei) found in the Gulf of Thailand on display.

Inside, the exhibition area is divided into several zones, including an economic fish zone, an ornamental fish and sealife zone, and a jellyfish zone. The jellyfish are showcased in tanks with bioluminescent displays that change colors according to the lighting. Microscopes are available for visitors to observe jellyfish stinging cells, and video presentations explain the feeding behavior of jellyfish ephyrae, with staff on hand to provide guidance.

A key highlight is the large tank exhibiting various large coral reef fish species, such as the giant trevally (Caranx ignobilis), barramundi (Lates calcarifer), mangrove jack (Lutjanus argentimaculatus), giant grouper (Epinephelus lanceolatus), zebra shark (Stegostoma tigrinum), and round ribbontail ray (Taeniurops meyeni). At 2:00 PM, there is a feeding session where food is dropped from above, and stepped seating is provided for visitors to watch.

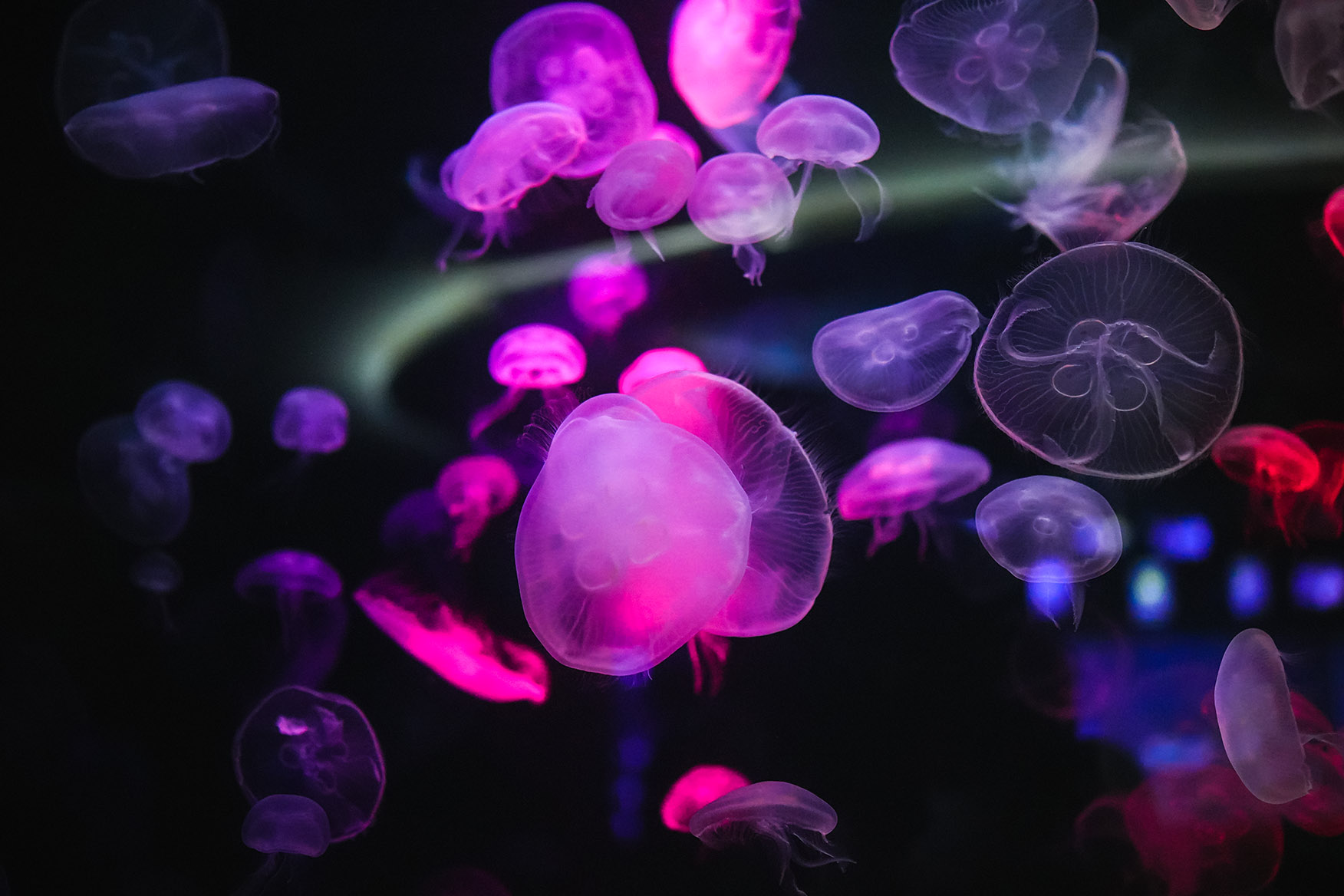
An exhibit featuring a school of glowing jellyfish

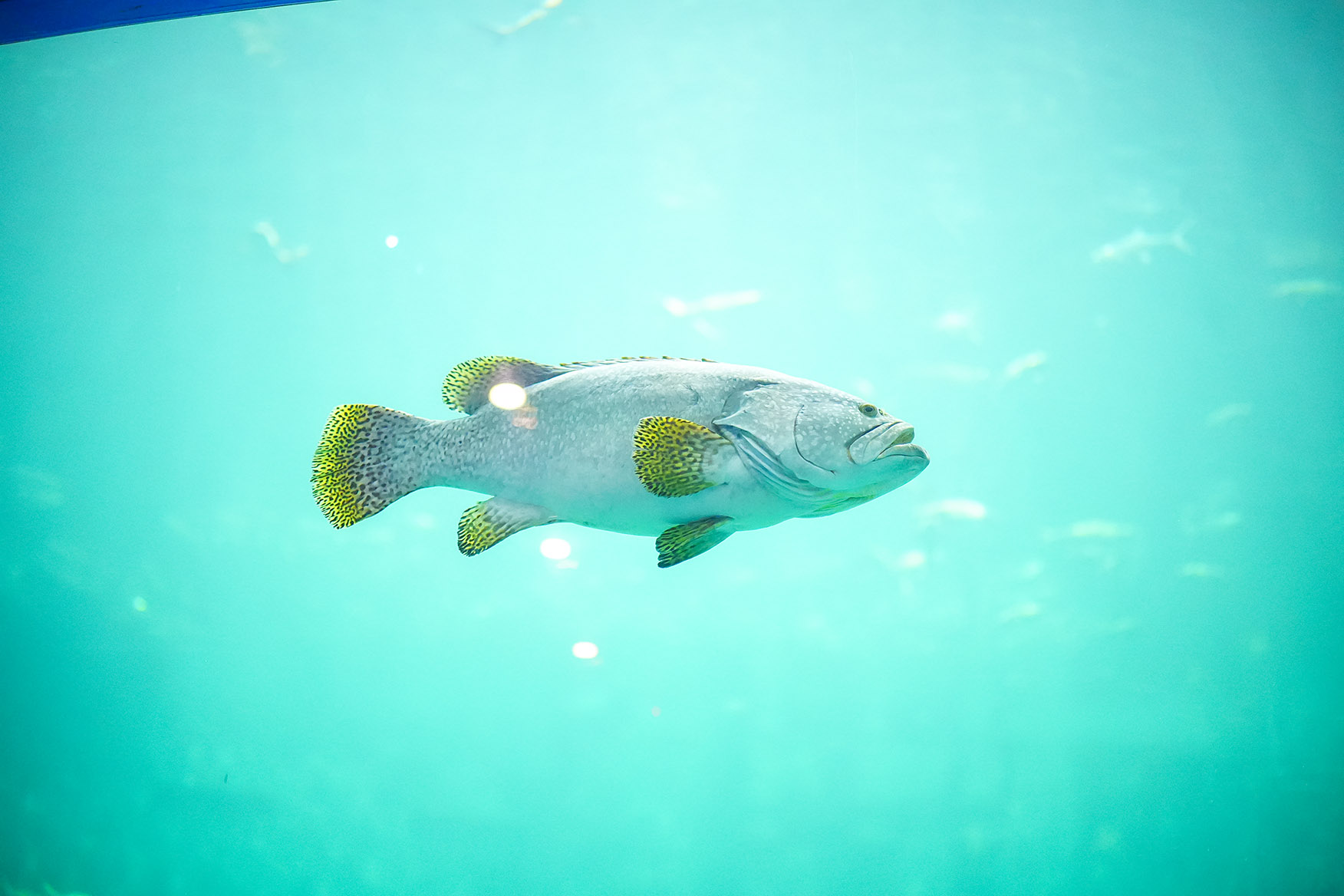
A large giant grouper

Another highlight is a newly opened zone in a separate building that opened on December 5, 2022. This zone displays shallow water fish, mangrove fish, and brownbanded bamboo shark (Chiloscyllium punctatum) mermaid's purses, which have been successfully bred in captivity. The exhibition is designed like an art gallery, with visitors walking down to the lower level where a large cylindrical tank, standing 8 m (26.2 ft) tall, and an acrylic tunnel that gently spirals downward, giving visitors the feeling of walking under the sea. This immersive underwater walkway stretches 37 m (121.4 ft) and ends with a long flat escalator that gently takes visitors back to the surface. Fish displayed here are similar to those in the large tank, with additional species such as the tawny nurse shark (Nebrius ferrugineus) and shovelnose ray (Rhinobatidae). The feeding session by divers also takes place at 2:00 PM in this zone.

The institute was the first in the world to successfully breed clownfish in captivity, and it offers knowledge and consultation to farmers interested in commercial breeding as well as to individuals wishing to keep marine animals as pets.

The Bangsaen Aquarium is open daily except Mondays, from 9:00 AM to 4:00 PM. Admission fees are 80 baht for adults and 40 baht for children (local visitors), while foreign visitors are charged 220 baht for adults and 120 baht for children. On weekends and public holidays, an additional fish feeding session is held at 10:30 AM.
