= Burapha University Hospital =

Burapha University Hospital โรงพยาบาลมหาวิทยาลัยบูรพา

Geography
- Location: 169 Long-Had Bangsaen Road, Bang Saen Subdistrict, Mueang Chonburi District, Chonburi 20131, Thailand
- Coordinates: 13.285239°N 100.922243°E

Organisation
- Type: Teaching
- Affiliated university: Faculty of Medicine, Burapha University

Services
- Beds: 500

History
- Opened: 31 August 1984 (as Health Sciences Center)

Links
- Website: hsc.buu.ac.th/buh61/
- Lists: Hospitals in Thailand

Burapha University Hospital (Thai: โรงพยาบาลมหาวิทยาลัยบูรพา) is a university teaching hospital, affiliated to the Faculty of Medicine of Burapha University, located in Mueang Chonburi District, Chonburi Province. It is a hospital capable of super tertiary care.

== History ==
The Burapha University Health Sciences Center (originally the Medical Center Project), donated by Gen. Arthit Kamlang-ek, was inaugurated on 31 August 1984. It was a two-story building, similar to other existing community hospitals, aimed to provide medical services to local citizens, with the potential of becoming a training institution. By 1985, the outpatient department had expanded, and the center was capable of 24-hour baby delivery. In 2008, following reforms in the university, the hospital operations were transferred to the faculty of Medicine.

== See also ==
- Health in Thailand
- Hospitals in Thailand
- List of hospitals in Thailand
