= Queen Savang Vadhana Memorial Hospital =

Queen Savang Vadhana Memorial Hospital โรงพยาบาลสมเด็จพระบรมราชเทวี ณ ศรีราชา
- The Thai Red Cross Society

Geography
- Location: 290 Chermchomphon Road, Si Racha Subdistrict, Si Racha District, Chonburi 20110, Thailand, Thailand
- Coordinates: 13.162063°N 100.918500°E

Organisation
- Type: Teaching
- Affiliated university: Faculty of Medicine, Burapha University; Faculty of Medicine, Chulalongkorn University

Services
- Beds: 500

History
- Former names: Srimaharacha Hospital; Somdej Hospital
- Founded: 10 September 1902

Links
- Website: www.somdej.or.th/index.php
- Lists: Hospitals in Thailand

Queen Savang Vadhana Memorial Hospital (Thai: โรงพยาบาลสมเด็จพระบรมราชเทวี ณ ศรีราชา) or Somdej Phra Boromma Ratchathewi Na Si Racha Hospital is a hospital located in Si Racha District, Chonburi Province, Thailand. It is a hospital operated by the Thai Red Cross Society. It has a CPIRD Medical Education Center which trains doctors of the Faculty of Medicine, Burapha University. It is an affiliated teaching hospital of the Faculty of Medicine, Chulalongkorn University.

== History ==
Following a visit to Bang Phra to recover from illness in 1898, Queen Savang Vadhana saw the lack of provision of medical services to citizens in the local area and ordered the construction of a small hospital to be located close by to her majesty's residence, next to the sea. The hospital was finished and opened on 10 September 1902, consisting of 5 thatched roof houses, initially named 'Srimaharacha Hospital'. King Chulalongkorn renamed the hospital 'Somdej Hospital'. The hospital was initially run with the support of Siriraj Hospital.

Due to gradual dilapidation of the hospital, the hospital director requested the Queen to move the location of the hospital further inland. This was completed in 1909 and all patients were moved to the new hospital. Throughout the duration of Queen Savang Vadhana's life, the hospital was funded by her majesty's expenses and this funding was continued by Princess Srinagarindra and King Bhumibol Adulyadej in later years. In 1918, the hospital management was changed to the Faculty of Medicine, Chulalongkorn University and later became a division under the Thai Red Cross Society. The hospital was renamed 'Queen Savang Vadhana Memorial Hospital' in 1997 in honour of the Queen.

On 17 July 2009, the hospital made an agreement with the Faculty of Medicine, Burapha University to train medical students of the clinical years (years 4-6) at the hospital, under the Collaborative Project to Increase Production of Rural Doctors (CPIRD). Teaching officially started on 16 March 2010.

== See also ==
- Healthcare in Thailand
- Hospitals in Thailand
- List of hospitals in Thailand
- Thai Red Cross Society
