= Somdech Phra Pinklao Hospital =

Somdech Phra Pinklao Hospital โรงพยาบาลสมเด็จพระปิ่นเกล้า
- The Royal Thai Navy

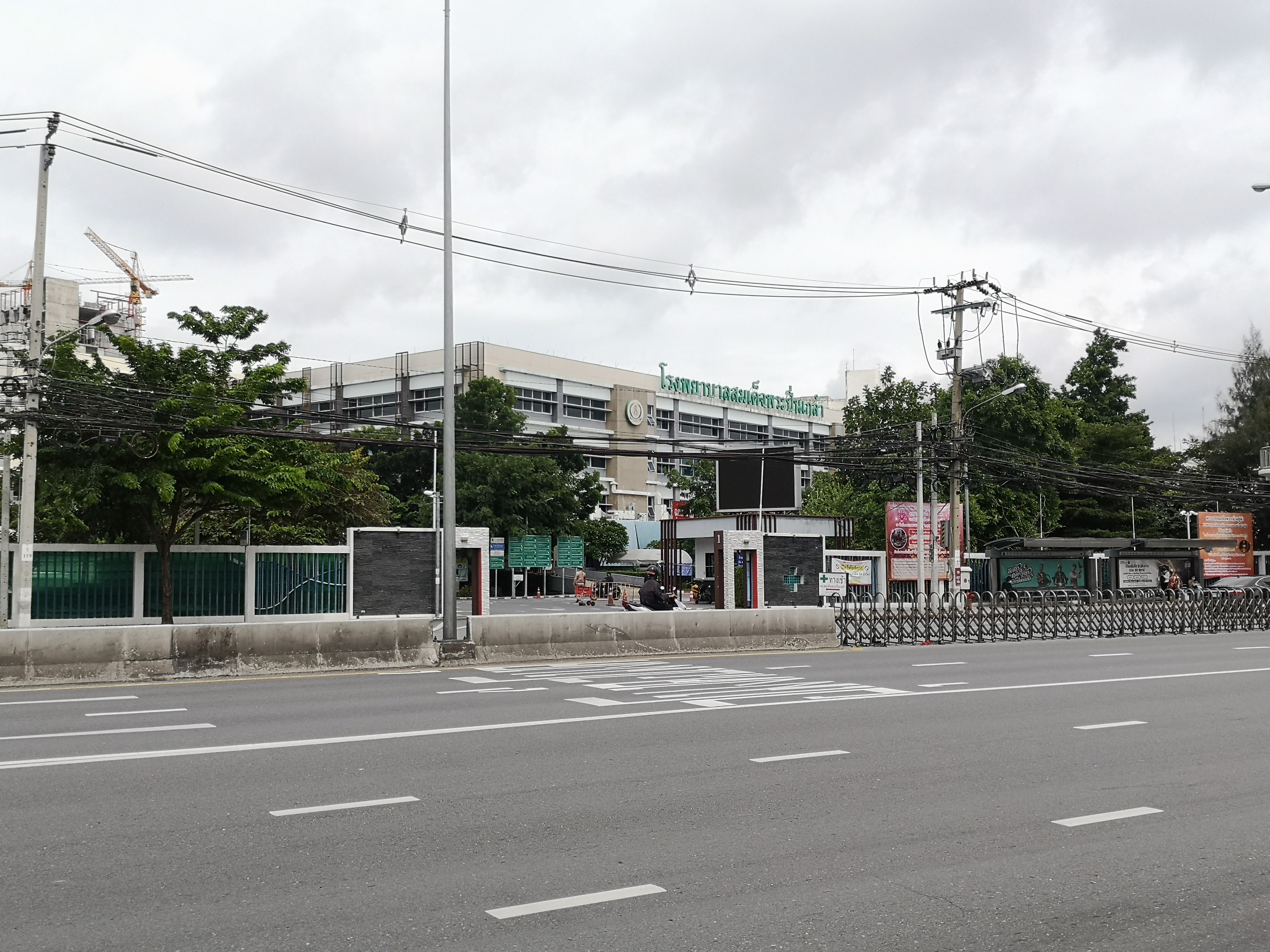

Geography
- Location: 504 Somdet Phrachao Taksin Road, Bukkhalo Subdistrict, Thon Buri District, Bangkok 10600, Thailand, Thailand
- Coordinates: 13.710108°N 100.486837°E

Organisation
- Type: Military, Teaching
- Affiliated university: Faculty of Medicine, Burapha University; Faculty of Medicine Siriraj Hospital, Mahidol University; Royal Thai Navy Nursing College

Services
- Beds: 507

History
- Former name: Bukkhalo Naval Hospital
- Founded: 27 March 1957

Links
- Website: www.spph.go.th
- Lists: Hospitals in Thailand

Somdech Phra Pinklao Hospital (Thai: โรงพยาบาลสมเด็จพระปิ่นเกล้า) is a hospital located in Thon Buri District, Bangkok, Thailand. It is a military hospital operated by the Naval Medical Department (NMD), The Royal Thai Navy particularly for personnel of the Royal Thai Navy, but also for the general public. It is the location of the headquarters of the NMD. It has a CPIRD Medical Education Center which trains medical students for the Faculty of Medicine, Burapha University. It is an affiliated teaching hospital of Faculty of Medicine Siriraj Hospital, Mahidol University. It is also a training center for several residency programs including surgery, emergency medicine and is the only institution in the country to open a maritime medicine residency program.

== History ==
Construction of the hospital began in 1952, initiated by Admiral Sindh Kamalanavin, then commander-in-chief and Admiral Lek Sumitr, then chief doctor of the Royal Thai Navy. The hospital opened on 27 March 1957 as Bukkhalo Naval Hospital. On 11 November 1959, the name was changed to Somdech Phra Pinklao Hospital after Viceroy Pinklao, the younger brother of King Mongkut and commander of the Front Palace Navy in the 1850s. On 7 January 1966, a statue of Viceroy Pinklao was unveiled at the hospital by King Bhumibol Adulyadej and Queen Sirikit.

== See also ==
- Healthcare in Thailand
- Hospitals in Thailand
- List of hospitals in Thailand
