= Queen Sirikit Naval Hospital =

Queen Sirikit Naval Hospital โรงพยาบาลสมเด็จพระนางเจ้าสิริกิติ์
- The Royal Thai Navy

Geography
- Location: 163 Mu 1, Phlu Ta Luang Subdistrict, Sattahip District, Chonburi Province 20180, Thailand, Thailand
- Coordinates: 12.688303°N 100.981585°E

Organisation
- Type: Military, Teaching
- Affiliated university: Phramongkutklao College of Medicine; Faculty of Medicine, Burapha University; Faculty of Medicine Vajira Hospital, Navamindradhiraj University

Services
- Beds: 1000

History
- Founded: 18 August 1992

Links
- Website: www2.nmd.go.th/sirikit/srkhosp/index2.html

Queen Sirikit Naval Hospital (Thai: โรงพยาบาลสมเด็จพระนางเจ้าสิริกิติ์) also stylised Somdech Phranangchao Sirikit Hospital, is a hospital located in Sattahip District, Chonburi Province, Thailand. It is a military hospital operated by the Naval Medical Department, The Royal Thai Navy particularly for personnel of the Royal Thai Navy, but also for the general public. It has a CPIRD Medical Education Center which trains medical students for the Faculty of Medicine, Burapha University. It is an affiliated teaching hospital of Phramongkutklao College of Medicine and the Faculty of Medicine Vajira Hospital, Navamindradhiraj University.

== History ==
Queen Sirikit Naval Hospital was constructed following the increase in usage of the Abhakornkiatiwong Hospital of Sattahip Naval Base, the increase in naval personnel and the development of the nearby U-Tapao International Airport and industrial areas such as Map Ta Phut. At the same time, this coincided with "The Celebrations on the Auspicious of Her Majesty the Queen's 5th Cycle Birthday Anniversary" and Queen Sirikit came and laid the foundation of the hospital on 18 August 1992. The construction was completed on 20 November 1995.

== See also ==
- Healthcare in Thailand
- Hospitals in Thailand
- List of hospitals in Thailand
