= Institute of Marine Sciences, University of Chittagong =

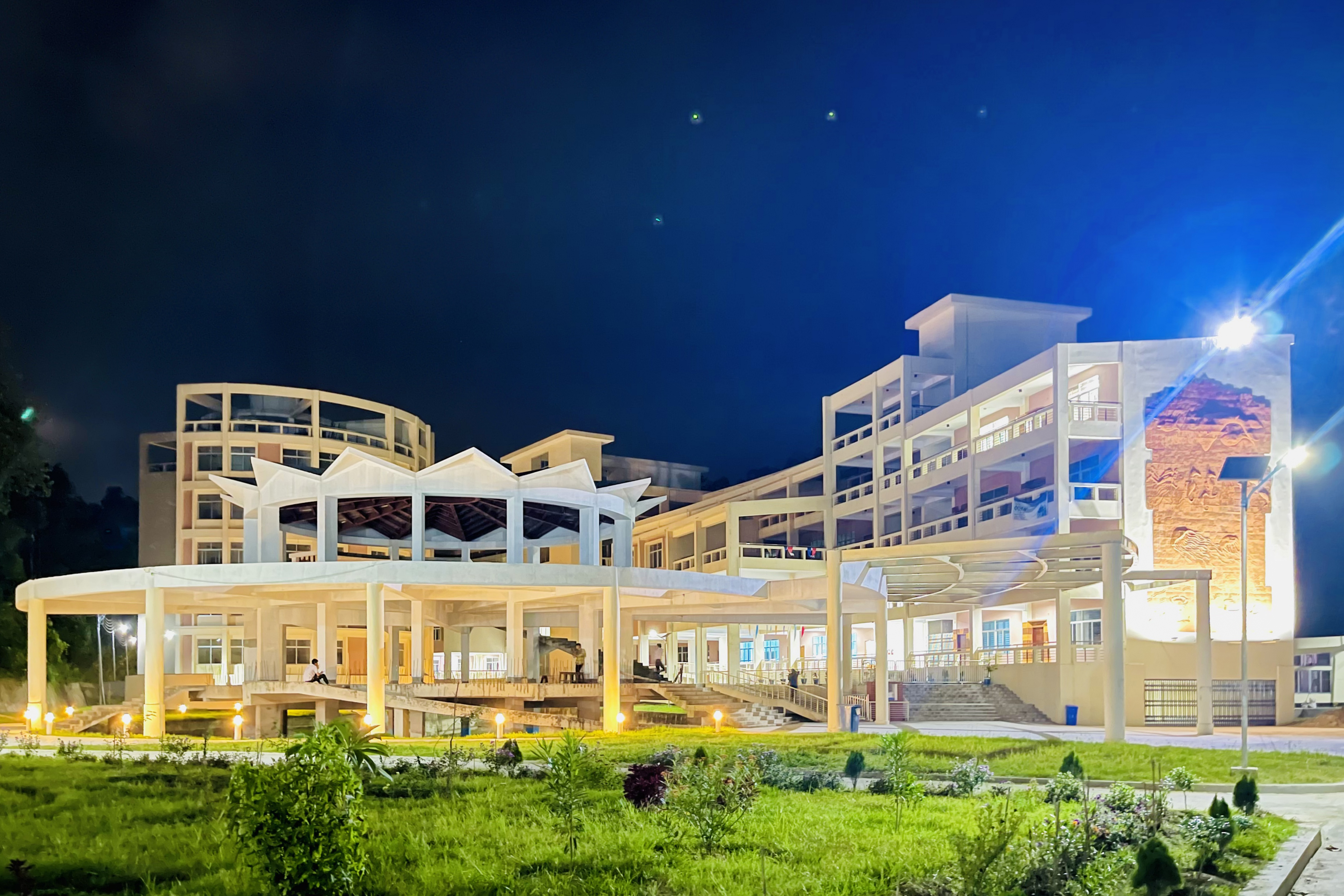
- Established: 1971
- Affiliation: University of Chittagong
- Location: Bangladesh
- Website: https://cu.ac.bd/ims/

Institute of Marine Sciences (IMS) is an institute of Chittagong University in Bangladesh.

== History ==
=== Founding ===
The institute was originally established as the Department of Marine Biology and Oceanography in 1971 and under the Canadian Technical Assistance Program, later included in the development scheme of the university under the Fourth Five-year Plan of Bangladesh. In 1983, it was turned into the Institute of Marine Sciences. It trains people in marine science and its related disciplines, researches on marine, brackish and related environments and their resources, provides assistance to the government on maritime issues, publishes books and journals on marine science, and disseminates technology on marine science to the stakeholders.

=== Specialisations ===
In 1996, the M.Sc. in marine science degree program at the institute has been diversified by introducing six specialisations, namely,

1. Fisheries

2.Aquaculture

3. Oceanography

4.Fish Nutrition & Feed Technology

5. Post-harvest Technology

6. Marine Pollution

=== Conversion to Faculty ===
In 2011, the Institute launched the country's first B.Sc. (Honours) in oceanography degree program, and in 2012, B.Sc. in fisheries (honours) program. Now the institute has upgraded to a faculty.
