= Bang Saen Beach =

Seaside resort in Thailand

Bang Saen บางแสน (Thai)
- Beach
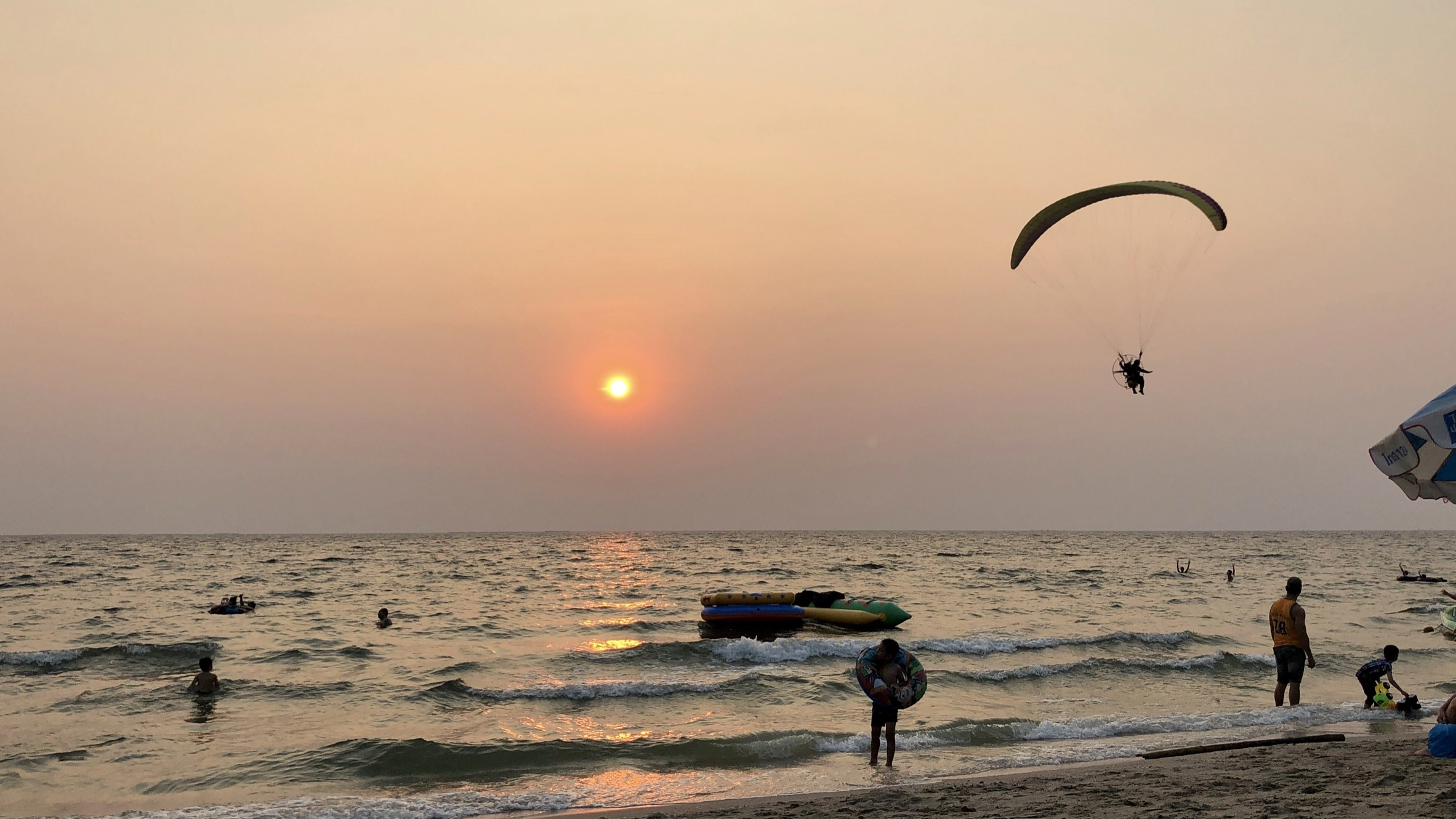
- Sunset at Bang Saen Beach

- Location within Chonburi Location within Thailand
- Coordinates: 13.291°N 100.909°E
- Location: Mueang Chonburi, Chonburi, Thailand
- Water bodies: Gulf of Thailand
- Etymology: Saen’s place
- Operator: Saen Suk town municipality

Dimensions
  - Length: 2.5 kilometres (1.6 mi)

Bang Saen Beach (Thai: หาดบางแสน, RTGS: Hat Bang Saen, pronounced [hàːt bāːŋ sɛ̌ːn]) simply known as Bang Saen is in Tambon (subdistrict) Saen Suk, Mueang Chonburi district, Chonburi province, eastern Thailand. It is about 108 km (67 mi) south of Bangkok, and is the city's nearest beach. It is a popular beach due to its proximity to Bangkok and Pattaya.

The beach is about 2.5 km (1.6 mi) long, maintained by Thesaban Mueang (town municipality) Saen Suk.

Its name, Bang Saen, comes from folklore about two young Chonburi lovers, Saen (แสน) and Sam Muk (สามมุก). The unrequited lovers threw themselves off a cliff and drowned together. Their names became the names of many places of Chonburi, such as Khao Sam Muk, a low hill near the beach. It has a shrine for Sam Muk at the foot of the hill.

Originally a fishing village, Bang Saen became a tourist attraction during the government of Field Marshal Plaek Phibunsongkhram, which was the same time as World War II, when the government built two seaside resorts were Bang Pu in Samut Prakan and Bang Saen, along with the construction of Sukhumvit road (Highway 3), making travel from Bangkok to the eastern seacoast easier.

The sea at Bang Saen is usually not clear. But from October to February of every year, the sea at Bang Saen is as clear as the Maldives, a natural phenomenon.

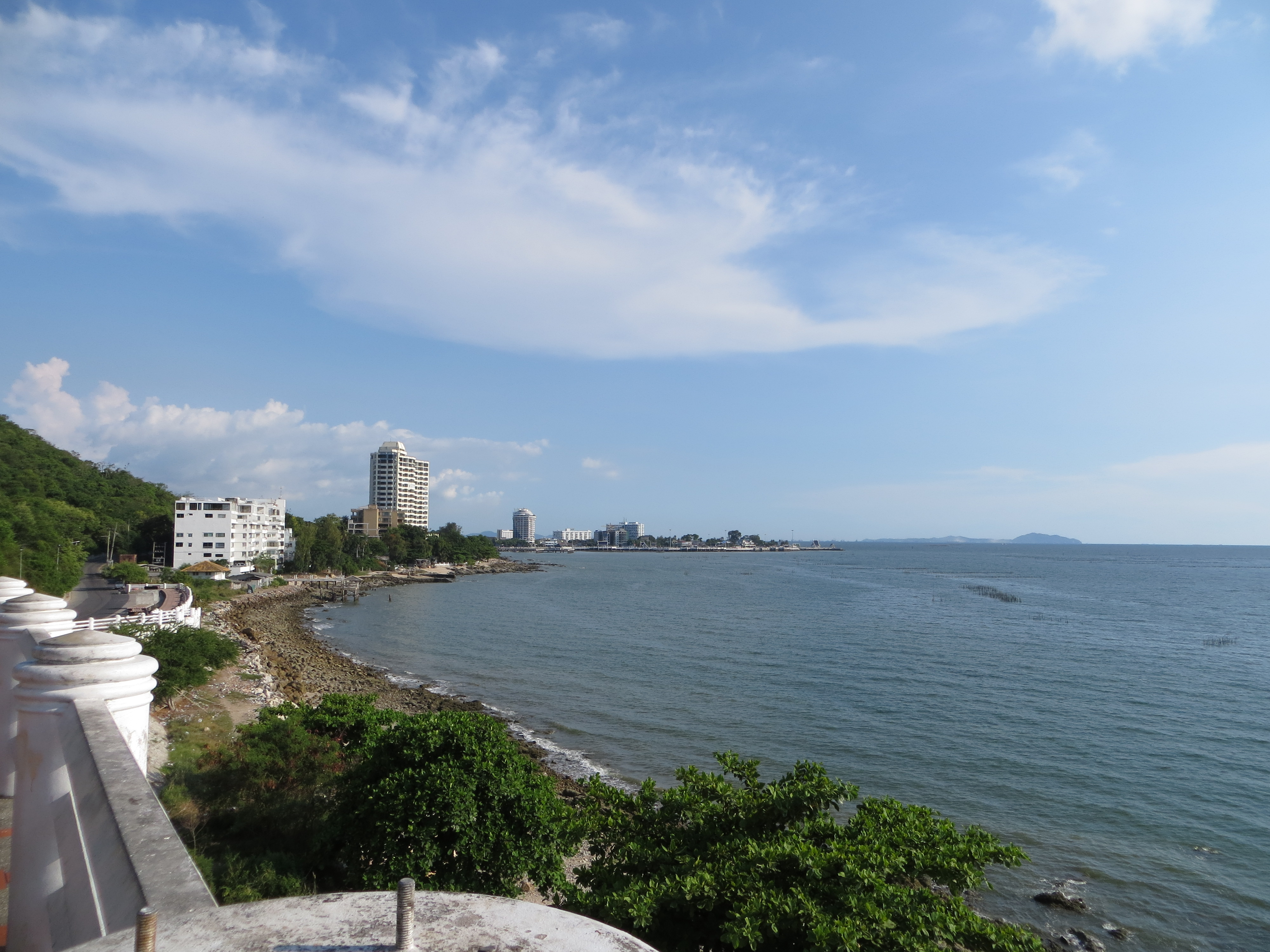
The beach seen from Khao Sam Muk

The Institute of Marine Science, Burapha University or popularly known as Bang Saen Aquarium in the campus of Burapha University. The aquarium is home to a variety of creatures, ranging from clown fish, butterfly fish, cardinal fish, seahorses, corals, nautiluses, horseshoe crabs, sea cucumbers, sea urchins, jellyfish, and starfish. Highlights of this aquarium are a Bryde's whale skeleton from the Gulf of Thailand and a large tank housing giant groupers, blacktip reef sharks, nurse sharks, zebra sharks, giant trevallies, round ribbontail ray, and giant guitarfish. It is regarded as another interesting attraction in Bang Saen area.

The sea around Bang Saen is another part of the Gulf of Thailand where Bryde's whales are often spotted feeding, reflecting the richness of the area's marine ecosystem.

In addition, the road from here to Pattaya serves as a venue for the annual Songkran celebration known as "Wan Lai" (วันไหล), which typically takes place after the official Songkran festivities elsewhere.
