= Thai Red Cross Society =

Thai humanitarian organization

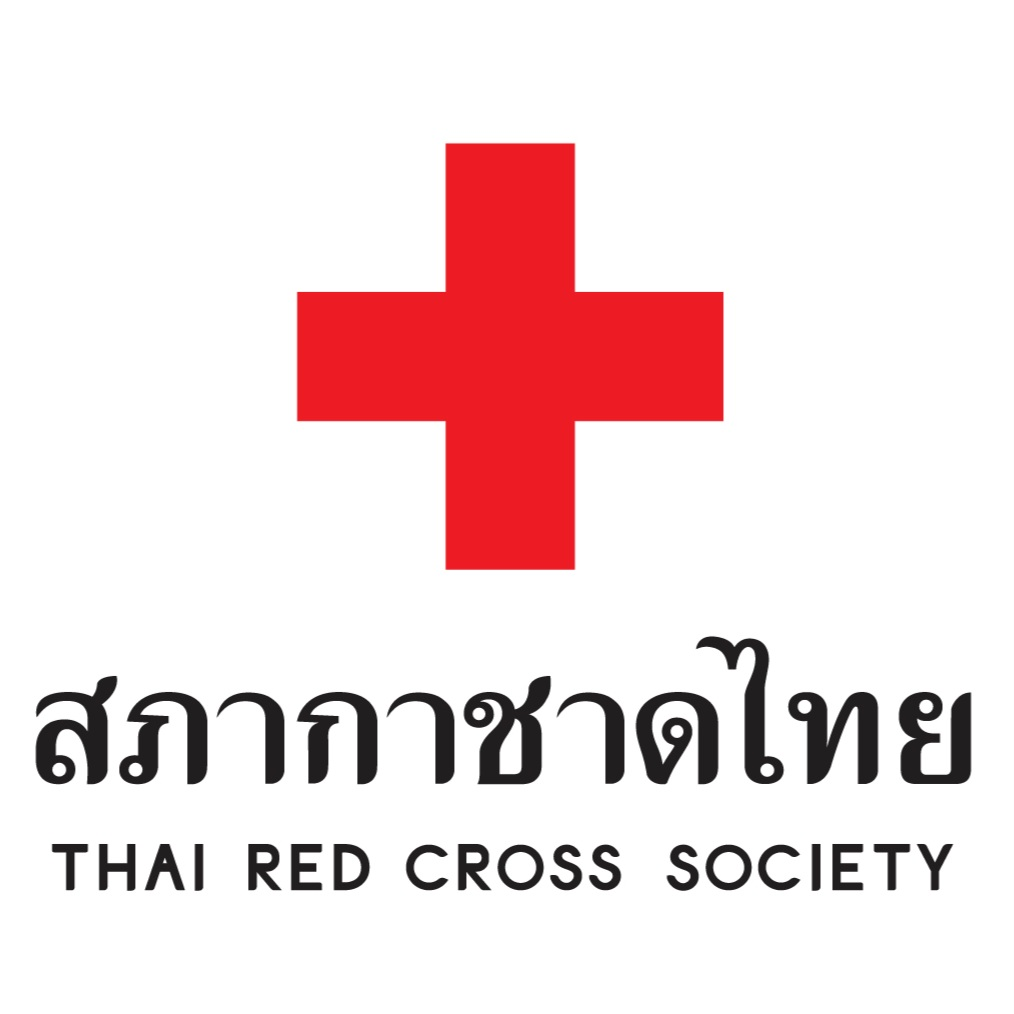
- Formation: 26 April 1893
- Type: Aid agency
- Headquarters: Bangkok
- Region served: Thailand
- Members: International Federation of Red Cross and Red Crescent Societies
- President: Queen Suthida
- Budget: THB 5,110,829,700 (2014)
- Website: Redcross.or.th

The Thai Red Cross Society (Thai: สภากาชาดไทย; RTGS: Sapha Ka Chat Thai) is a major humanitarian organisation in Thailand, providing services as part of the International Red Cross and Red Crescent Movement.

The society was founded in 1893 and is headquartered in Bangkok. It is governed by the Act on Thai Red Cross Society, Buddhist Era 2461 (1918), and is supervised by the Council of Ministers. Its expenses are borne by the government. Its president is appointed by the king upon advice and consent of the council of ministers. The president was Queen Sirikit who held the position from 12 August 1956 until her death on 24 October 2025.

== History ==
The origin of the Thai Red Cross Society dates to the Franco-Siamese territorial dispute of 1893 in which no organised aid was available to assist military casualties. Lady Plien Pasakornravongs assembled a group of female volunteers and asked Queen Savang Vadhana for royal permission to establish a humanitarian organisation. Permission was granted by King Chulalongkorn, who also granted permission to raise initial funding, 443,716 baht. The society, then known as the Red Unalom Society (สภาอุณาโลมแดง), was founded on 26 April 1893, with Queen Savang Vadhana as maternal patron. Queen Saovabha was appointed the first president, and Lady Plien acted as the society secretary.

The society's name was later changed to the Siam Red Cross Society and, following the renaming of the country, the Thai Red Cross Society. The society was officially recognized by the International Committee of the Red Cross on 27 May 1920, and membership in the International Federation of Red Cross and Red Crescent Societies (then the League of Red Cross Societies) was granted on 8 April 1921.

== Services ==
Following the statutes of the International Red Cross and Red Crescent Movement, the Thai Red Cross Society provides humanitarian aid and relief services in times of war and disaster, which is handled by its Relief and Public Health Bureau. The bureau offers public health services in remote areas of the country. The society also provides other medical and charitable services.

In total the Thai Red Cross Society has 14 bureaus, 6 specialized centers, and 5 special affair offices. Key focus areas are holistic public health services, disaster relief assistance, supply of blood products and transfusion, and improving quality of life in impoverished communities.

=== Medical services ===
The Thai Red Cross Society operates the King Chulalongkorn Memorial Hospital in Bangkok, with 1,479 beds, one of the largest hospitals in the country, and Queen Savang Vadhana Memorial Hospital, a 500-bed general hospital in Si Racha District, Chonburi Province. The Red Cross Rehabilitation Centre in Samut Prakan Province, provides physical medicine and rehabilitation services for long-term patients.

=== Blood donation ===
Blood donation services provided by the National Blood Centre are one of the society's most visible activities. Founded in 1952, the centre collects, processes, and provides blood and blood components to hospitals in Bangkok and nationwide through 147 regional chapters.

=== Organ donation ===
The Thai Red Cross Organ Donation Centre began operation in 1994 and is the sole national coordinator of organ donations. The Thai Red Cross Eye Bank, in operation since 1965, provides eye tissue for corneal transplantation, and has 10 regional offices.

=== AIDS programme ===
In 1991, the Thai Red Cross Society AIDS Research Centre opened the first HIV-voluntary counselling and testing clinic in Asia.

The Thai Red Cross AIDS Research Centre offers HIV testing and counseling services through its Anonymous Clinic, and runs education and awareness campaigns to battle the spread of the epidemic and better the lives of those living with HIV. The centre conducts research on HIV and clinical interventions under HIV-NAT and SEARCH units, and offers many services to help those living with HIV.

=== Vaccines and rabies prevention ===
Queen Saovabha Memorial Institute produces BCG and rabies vaccines and snake antivenins for national distribution. The institute provides rabies prevention and immunisation services. Its snake farm is open to visitors and tourists, providing education in addition to its research activities.

=== Medical education ===
The Srisavarindhira Thai Red Cross Institute of Nursing is one of the country's major professional nurse training centres. King Chulalongkorn Memorial Hospital serves as the teaching hospital for both the college and also the Faculty of Medicine, Chulalongkorn University.

=== Child welfare ===
The Thai Red Cross Children's Home takes care of abandoned children at King Chulalongkorn and Queen Savang Vadhana Memorial Hospitals, and attempts to reunite the families or provide the children with suitable adoptive homes.

=== Transgender services ===
On November 27, 2015, The Thai Red Cross AIDS Research Centre in Bangkok opened the first clinic in Asia to target services exclusively to the transgender community. The Tangerine Community Health Centre is funded by the US Agency for International Development.

== See also ==
- List of Red Cross and Red Crescent Societies
