= Burapha University =

Public university in Saen Suk, Thailand

- มหาวิทยาลัยบูรพา
- Motto: Sukho Paññā Paṭilābho (Pali)
- Motto in English: Gaining Intellectual Knowledge Brings Happiness.
- Type: Public (National)
- Established: 8 July 1955 as Bangsaen College of Education; 29 July 1990 as Burapha University
- Affiliations: ASAIHL; AUN
- President: Professor Sompong Pongthai, MD
- Royal conferrer: Maha Chakri Sirindhorn, Princess Royal of Thailand on behalf of the King
- Students: 47,865
- Undergraduates: 39,441
- Postgraduates: 7,095
- Doctoral students: 1,329
- Location: Saen Suk, Chonburi, Thailand; 13.285895°N 100.924753°E
- Symbolic tree: Coconut tree
- Colours: Gray – Gold
- Website: buu.ac.th

Burapha University (BUU) (Thai: มหาวิทยาลัยบูรพา) is one of Thailand's public universities. It is in the coastal town of Saen Suk, near the beach of Bangsaen in Chonburi province. It was established on 8 July 1955, originating from Bangsaen Educational College which was the first regional tertiary educational institute. The university offers degrees in more than 50 programs of study, including 75 master's programs, three EdD programs, and 22 PhD programs.

Burapha University has three campuses:

- Burapha University, Chonburi Campus, Mueang Chonburi district, Chonburi province established in 1955.
- Burapha University, Chanthaburi Campus, Tha Mai district, Chanthaburi province established in 1996.
- Burapha University, Sakaeo Campus, Watthana Nakhon district, Sa Kaeo province established in 1997.

The university colors are gray and gold. Gray represents the progress of intellectual knowledge. Gold represents morality. The colors represent University's commitment to the intellectual knowledge and morality.

In September 2016, Prime Minister Prayut Chan-o-cha invoked Section 44 of the interim charter allowing him to form a special panel to take over administration of the university as it was judged to be incapable of administering itself.

== History ==
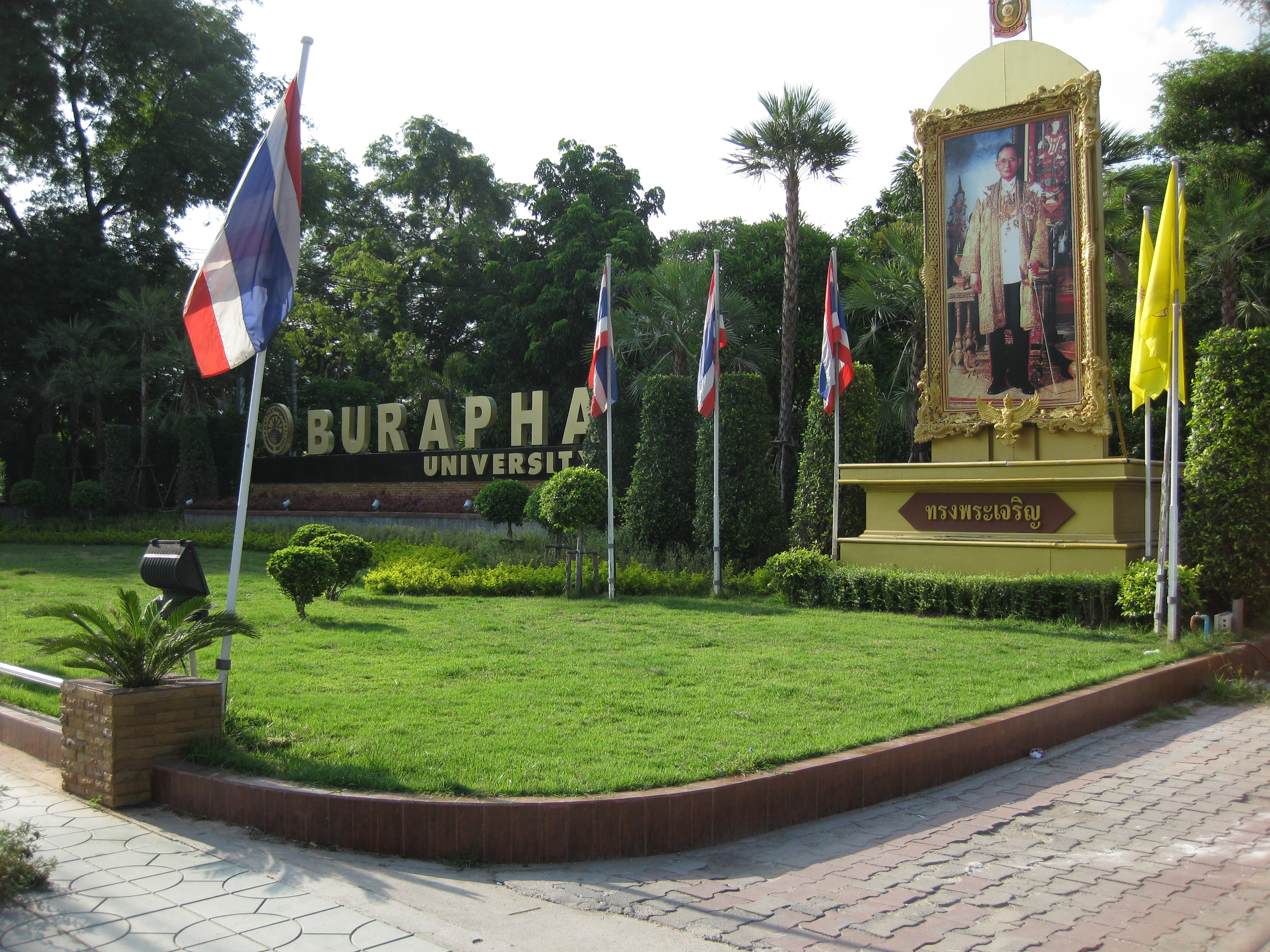
Burapha University Chonburi Campus Entrance Sign

The university began as Bangsaen Educational College established on 8 July 1955, the first tertiary educational institution outside of Bangkok established to encourage teacher education. There were 41 first generation students.

In 1956 the college received Piboonbumpen School from the Division of General Education to be a demonstration school of the college and renamed it "Piboonbumpen" Demonstration School.

In 1984, when the Prasarnmitr College of Education in Bangkok was upgraded to university level and named Srinakharinwirot University, Bangsaen Educational College was included as a branch campus and started to offer degrees besides teacher education. In 1988, the cabinet was agreed to transform its status to become a new university and in 1990, as a result of the implementation the Thai government's Eastern Seaboard Development Project to industrialize the area, the Bangsaen Campus was upgraded to full university level and renamed Burapha University, which means "University of the East".

For more effective pedagogical management; for instance, Chanthaburi Campus was established in 1996 and one year later Sakaeo Campus was established.

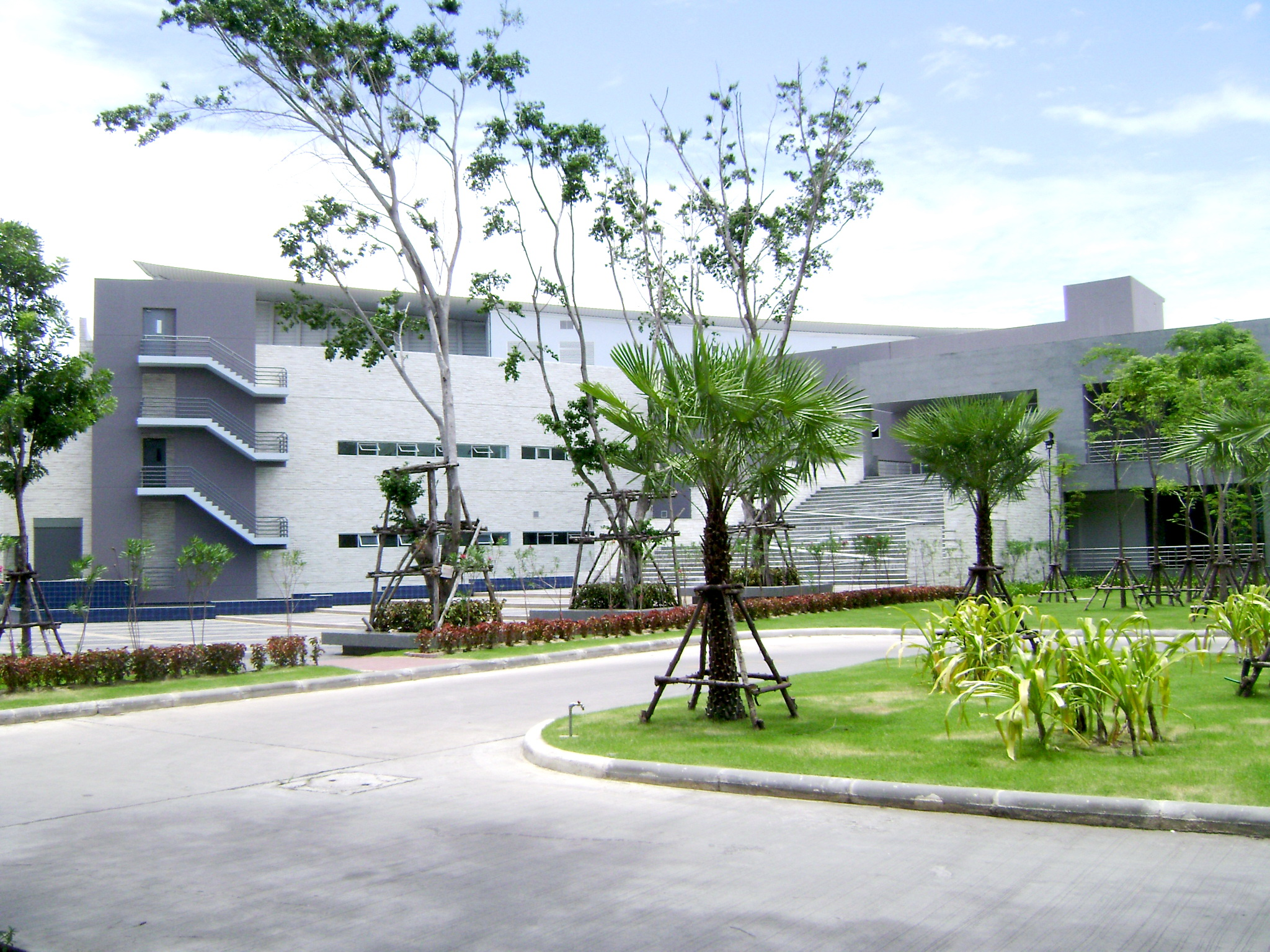
World Beneath the Sea, One of tourist attraction in Burapha University

Aside from its status as a government university, many students are drawn to the institution due to its location in Bangsaen, a resort destination popular with Thai tourists (particularly day visitors from Bangkok) that remains relatively unknown to foreign visitors.

In addition, the university contains service centers such as the Institute of Marine Science, whose aquarium is a major tourist attraction, the Library Center, the Academic Services Center, the Computer Center, and the University Hospital, which provides extensive medical services to the surrounding community.

== Faculty, College and School ==
Burapha University has three campuses, which together cover about 1,353.35 acres (5.48 km2) of land. Burapha University consists of Twenty-Two faculties, One college and One School.

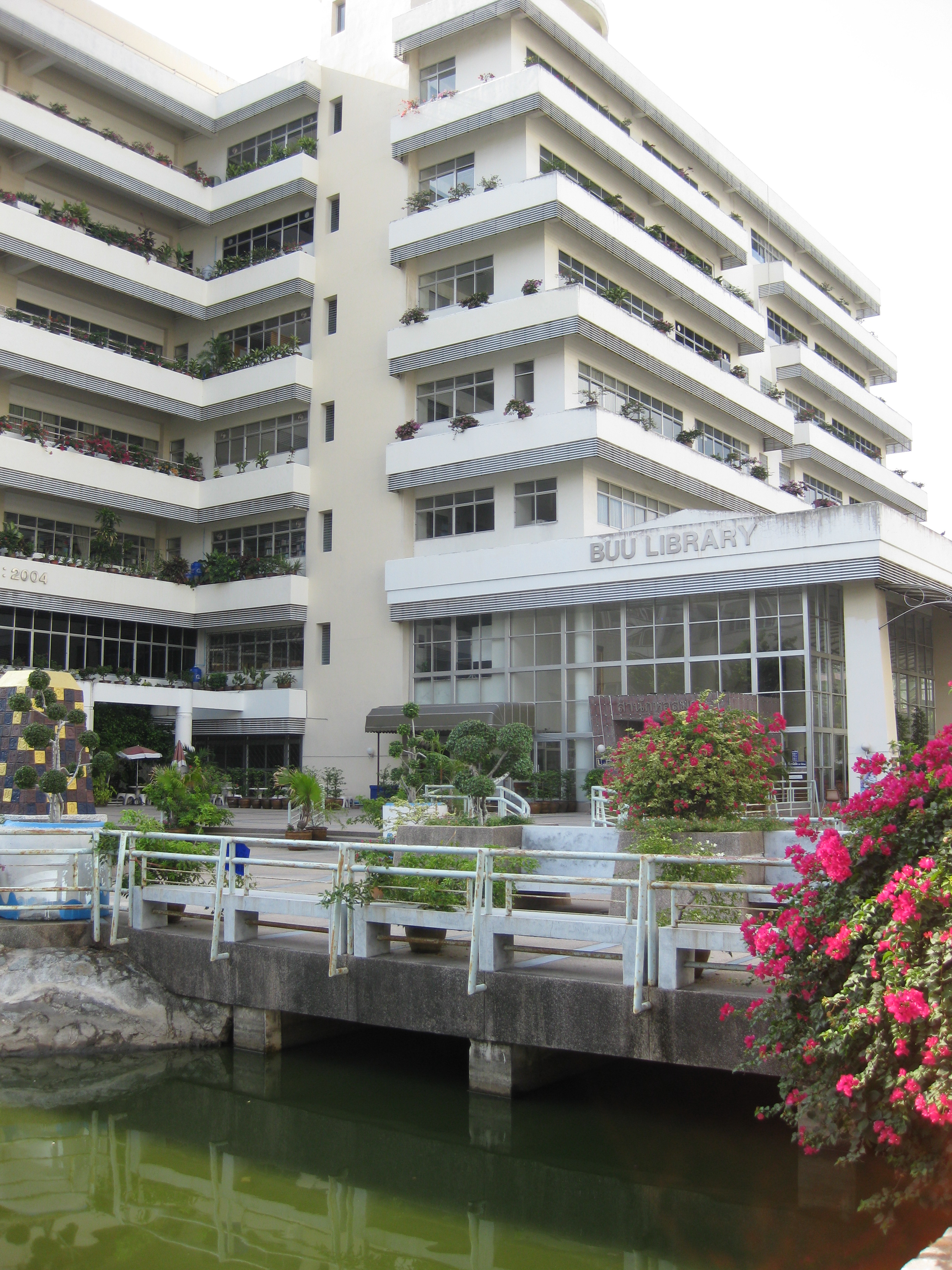
Burapha University Library

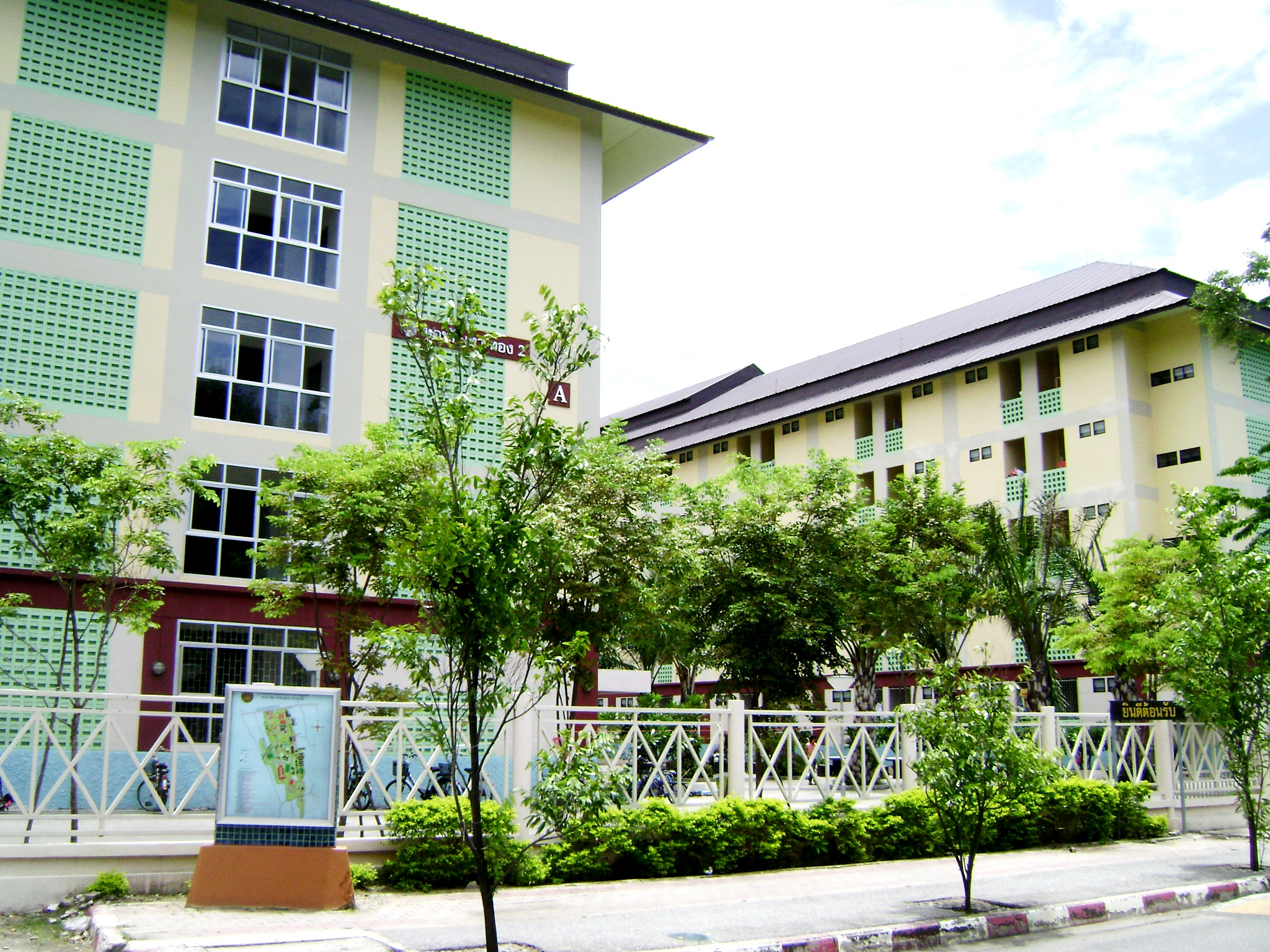
Gray-Gold 50th 2 Dorm

=== Burapha University, Chonburi Campus ===
- Faculty of Abhibhubejr Thai Traditional Medicine
- Faculty of Allied Health Sciences
- Faculty of Education
- Faculty of Engineering
- Faculty of Fine and Applied Arts
- Faculty of Geo-Informatics
- Faculty of Humanities and Social Sciences
- Faculty of Informatics
- Faculty of Logistics
- Faculty of Management and Tourism
- Faculty of Medicine (link)
- Faculty of Nursing
- Faculty of Political Science and Law
- Faculty of Pharmaceutical Sciences
- Faculty of Public Health
- Faculty of Science
- Faculty of Sport Science
- Burapha University International College
- Graduate School of Public Administration
- Graduate School of Commerce
- College of Research Methodology and Cognitive Science

=== Burapha University, Chanthaburi campus ===
- Faculty of Marine Technology
- Faculty of Gems
- Faculty of Science and Art

=== Burapha University, Sakaeo Campus ===
- Faculty of Agricultural Technology
- Faculty of Science and Social Sciences

=== Research Institutes/Schools ===
- Burapha University Hospital
- Institute of Marine Science
- Institute for Research in Culture and the Arts
- Institute for Burapha Linux
- Language Institute
- Korean Studies Center
- Eastern Region Center Space Technology and Geo-Informatics
- Vocational Education Demonstration School
- Piboonbumpen Demonstration School (K-12)

== Rankings ==
=== Webometrics ===
Burapha University overall ranks in the nation is 11th ranked by Webometrics. The international ranks are between 191 and 200 in Asia (Quacquarelli Symonds, 2013)

=== World's Universities with Real Impact (WURI) ===
World's Universities with Real Impact (WURI) ranks Burapha University in the 80th in the world by the ranking of 100 Innovative Universities 2020 (WURI 2020: Global Top 100 Innovative Universities) as the only university in Thailand to be ranked. This time The ranking results were announced in an online conference on 11 June 2020. Burapha University is also ranked 23rd on the TOP 50 Industrial Application and 40th on the TOP 50 Entrepreneurial Spirit.

== Gallery ==
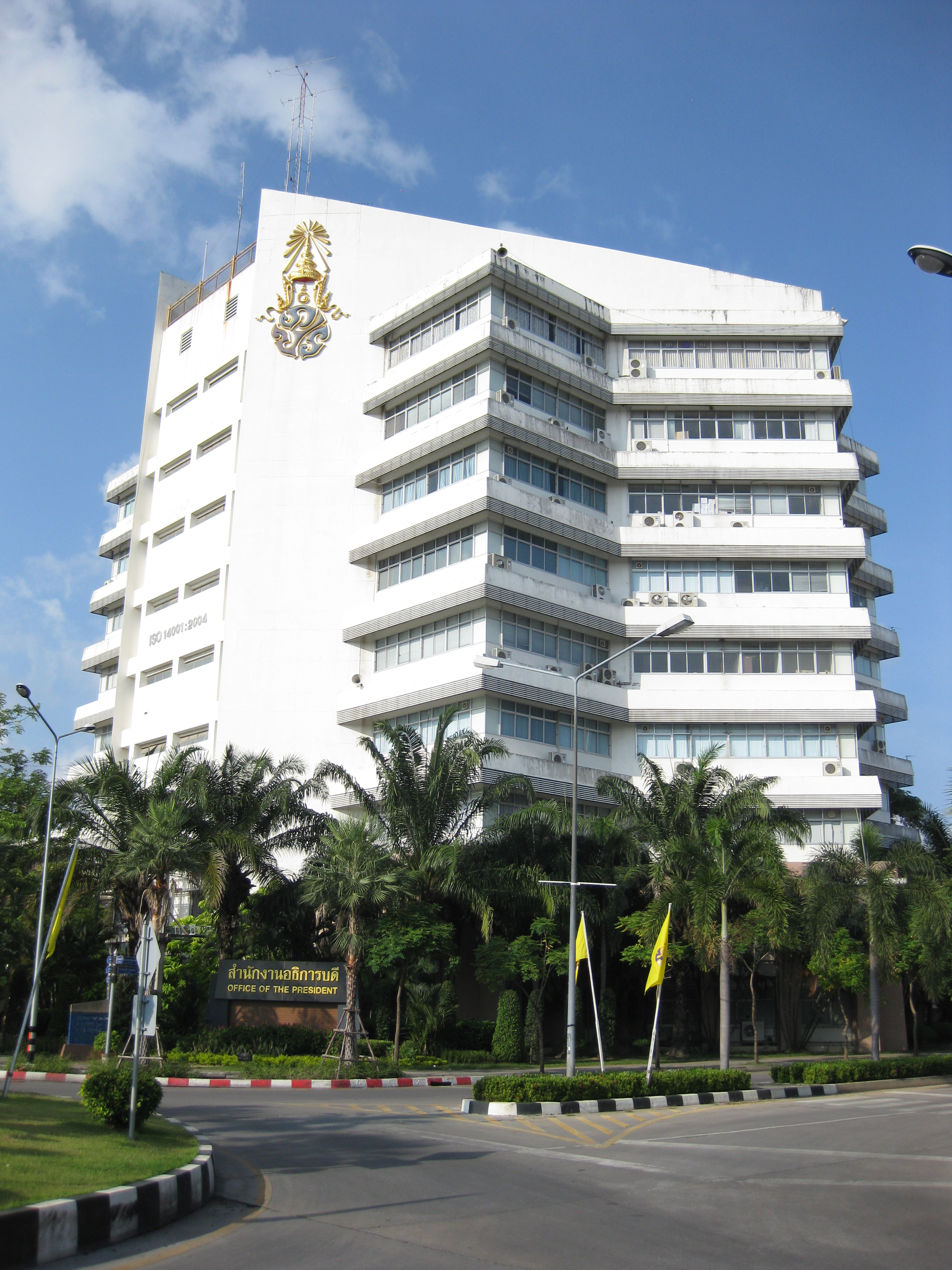
Office of the President

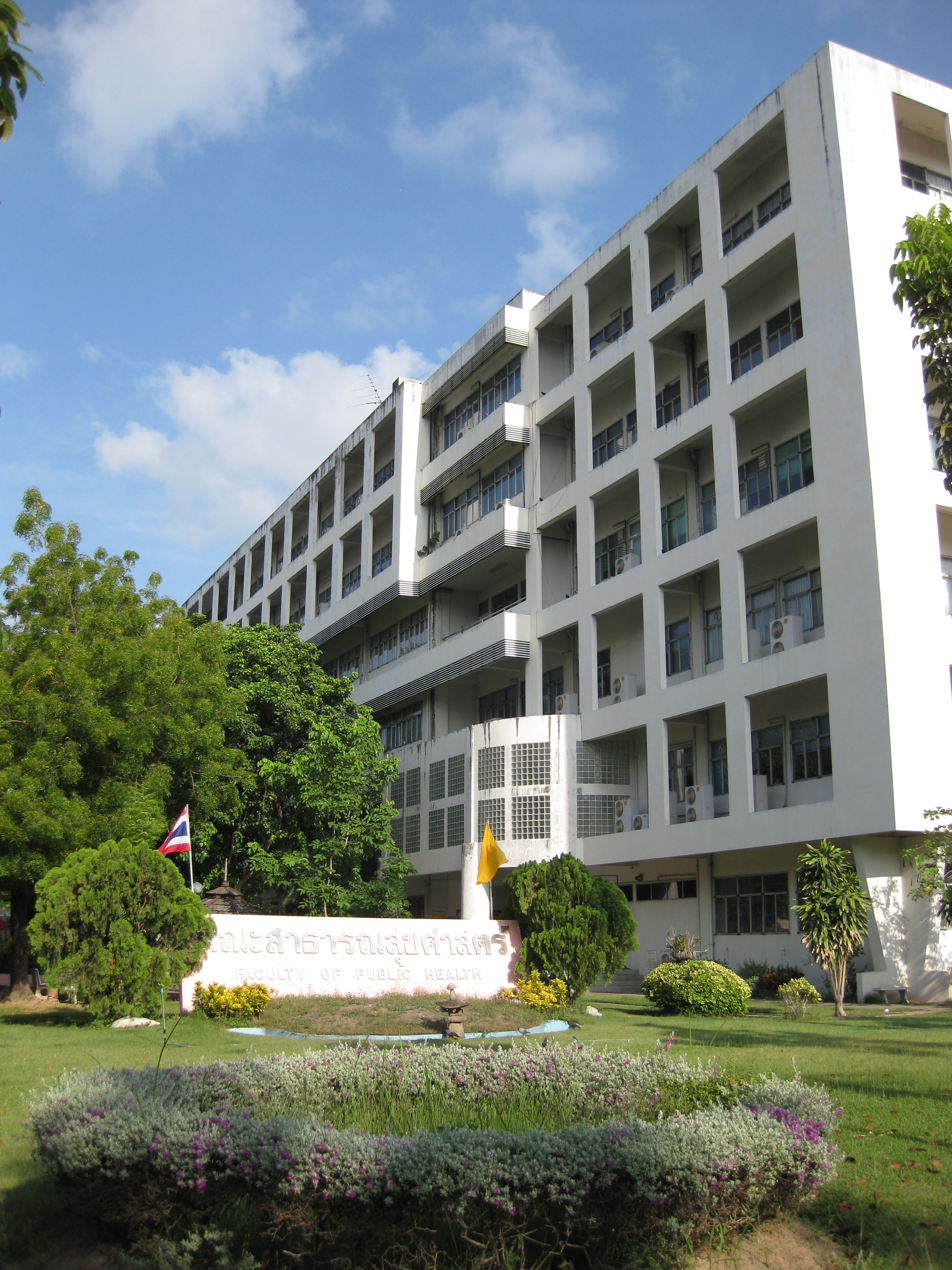
Faculty of Public Health

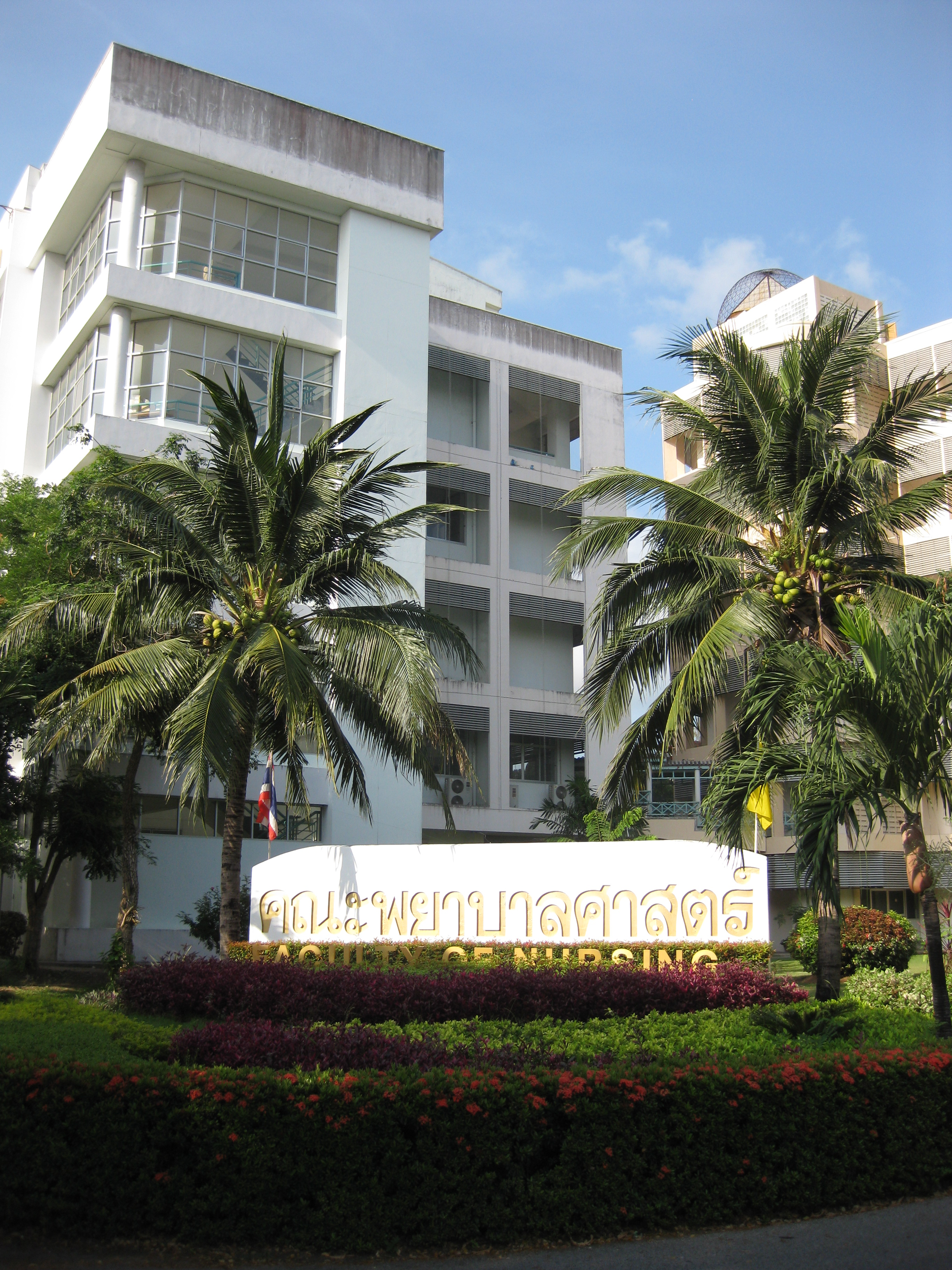
Faculty of Nursing

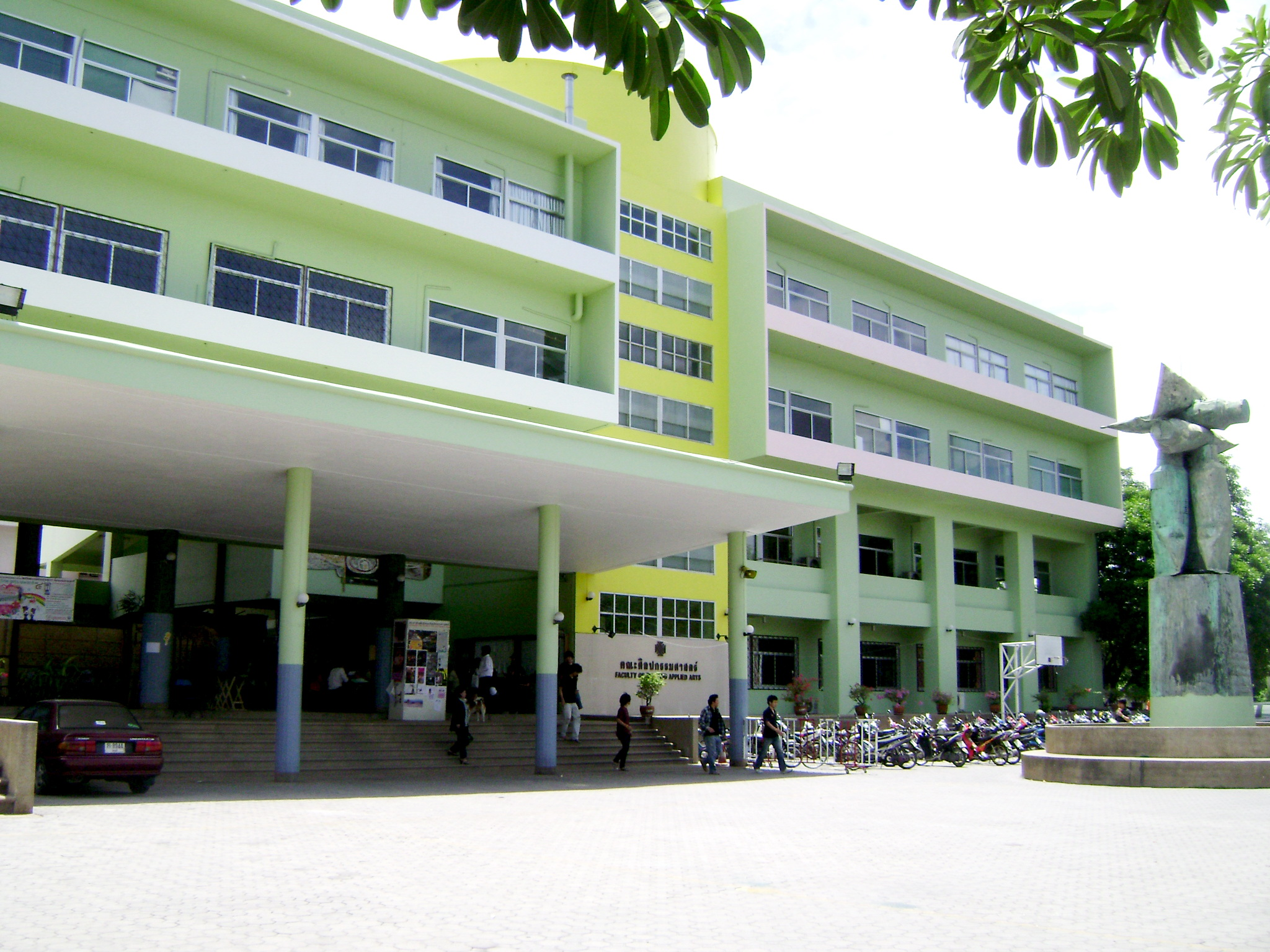
Faculty of Fine and Applied Arts

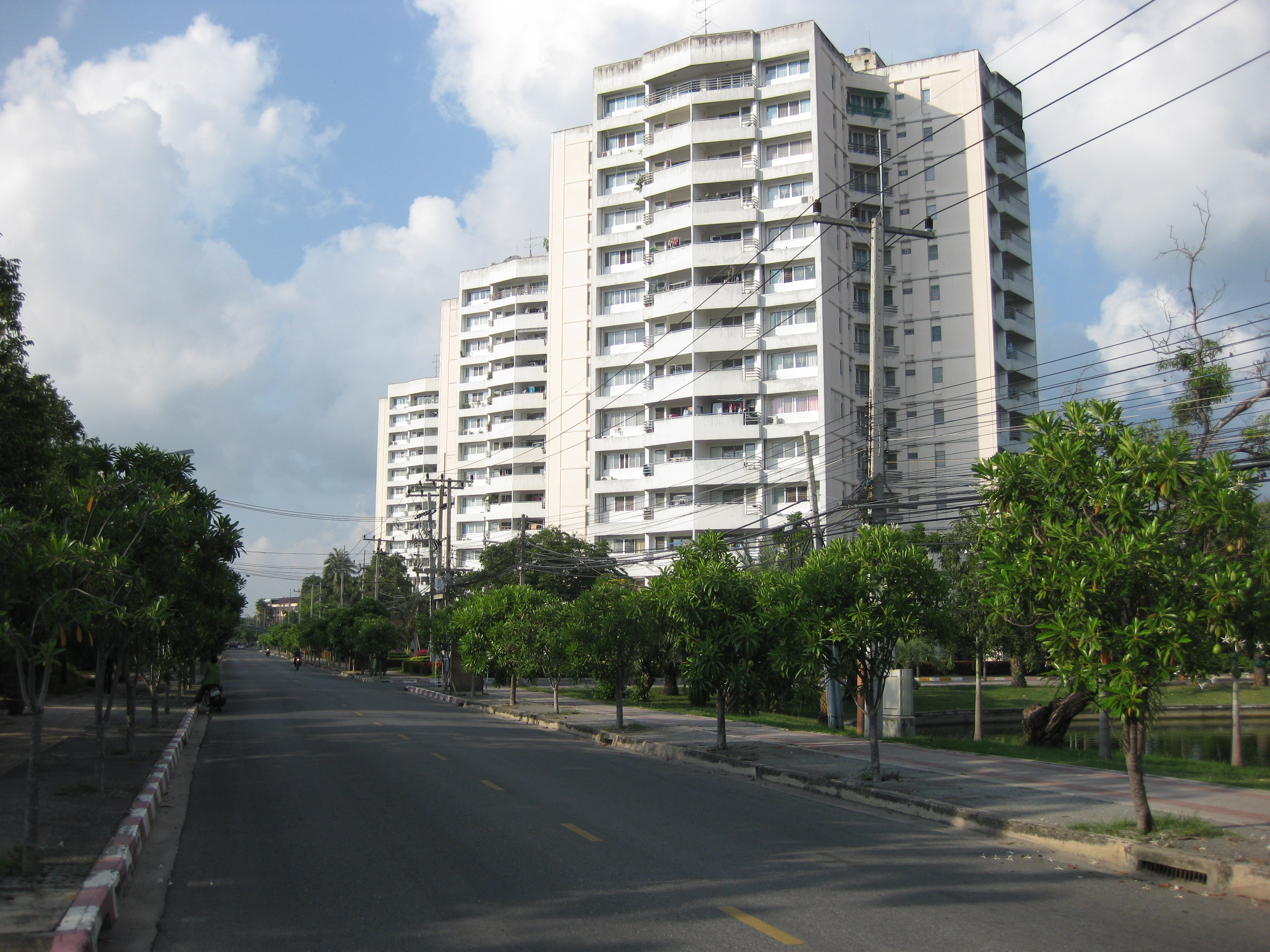
Housing for Graduate Students

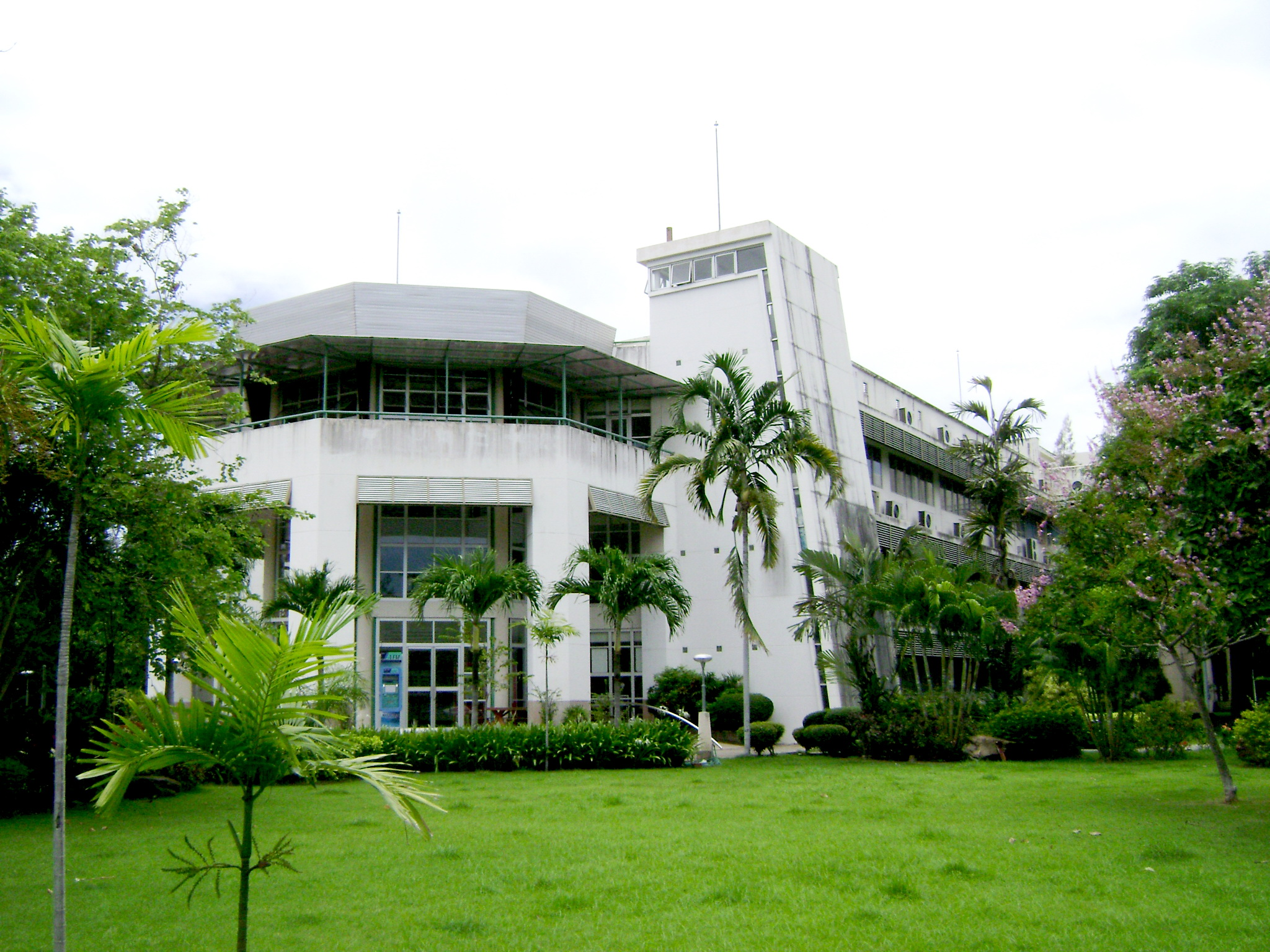
Computer Center Burapha University

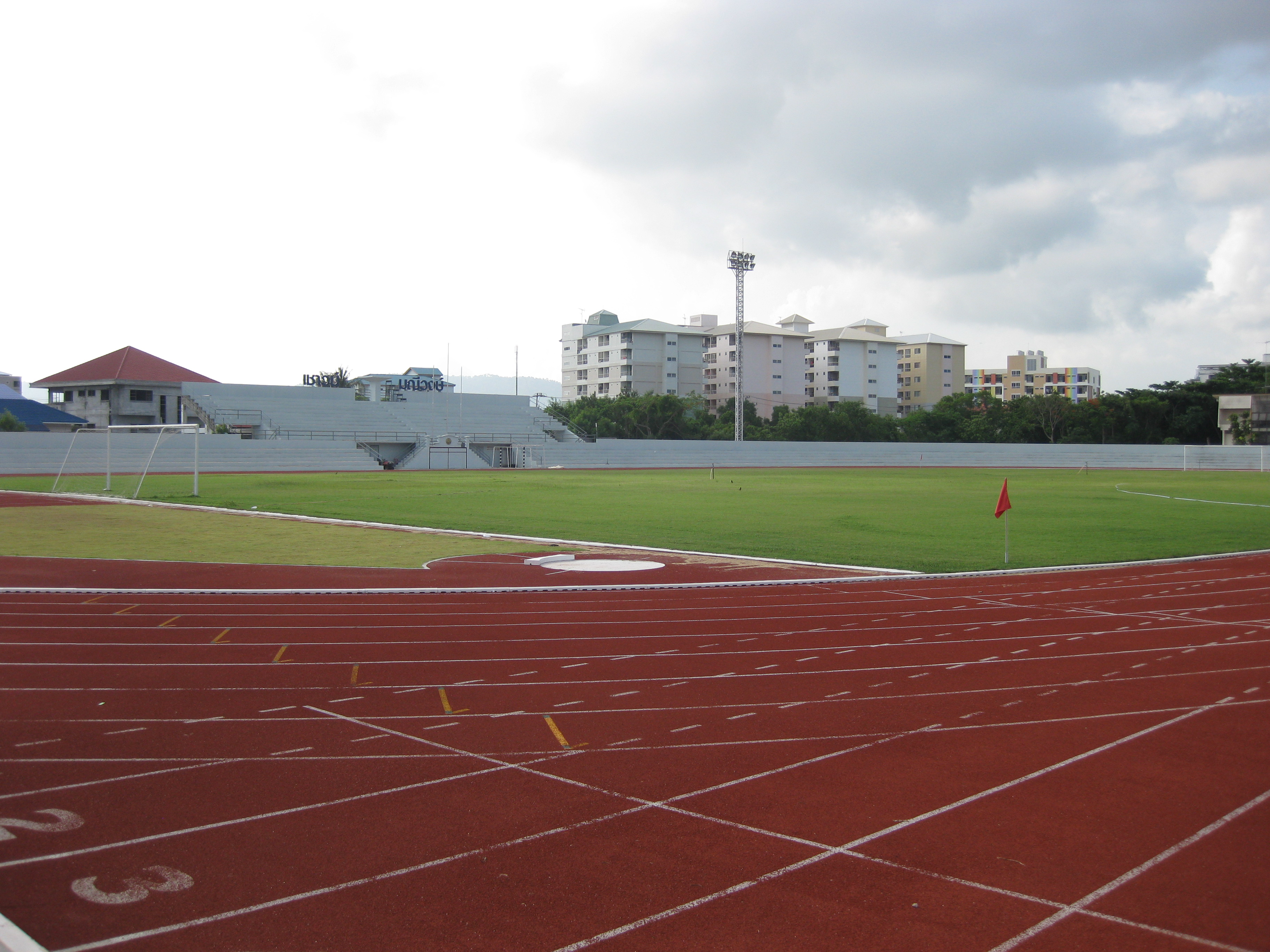
Chow Maneewong Stadium
