= Chonburi province =

Province of Thailand

Chonburi ชลบุรี
- Province

Other transcription(s)
  - Teochew: 萬佛歲
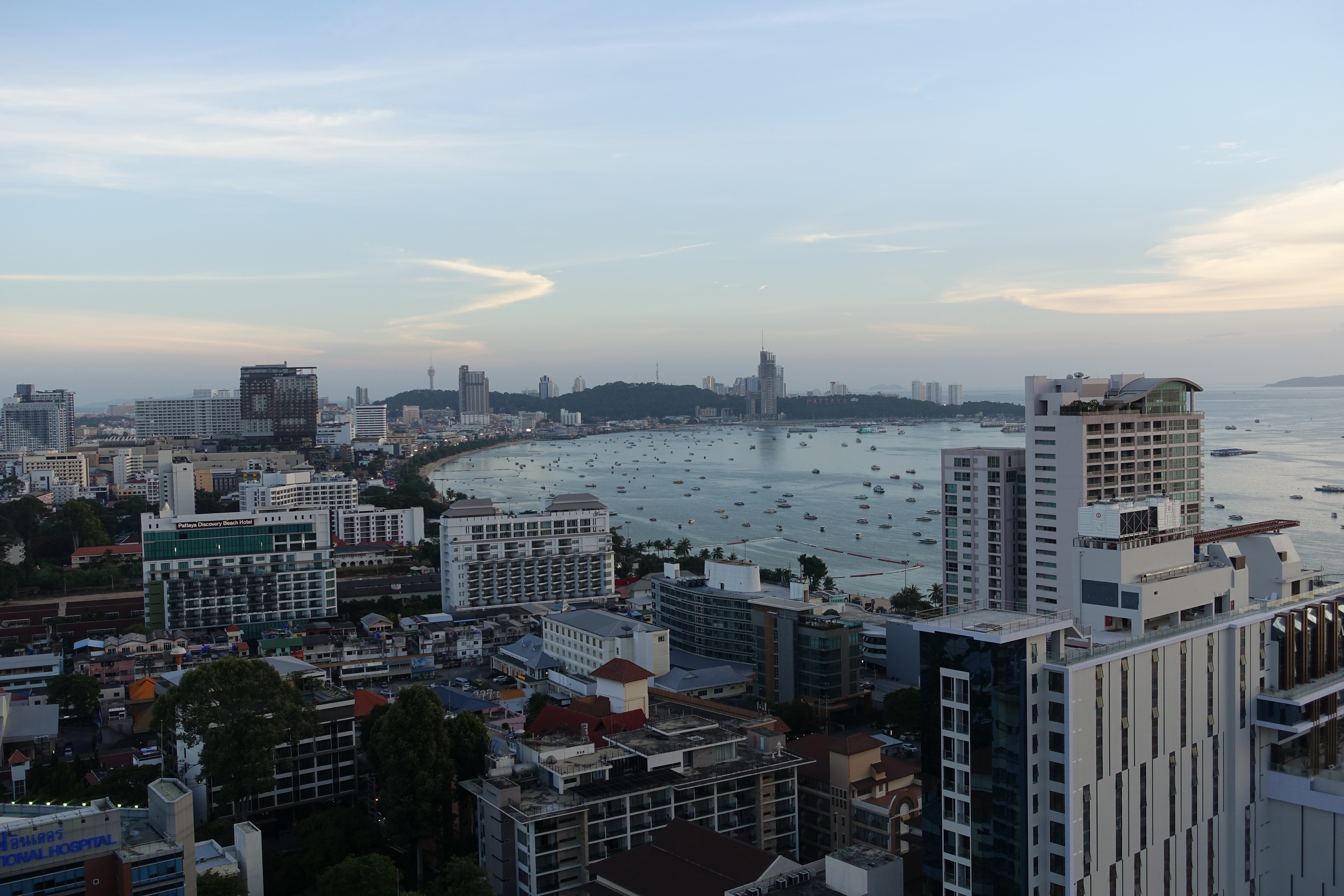
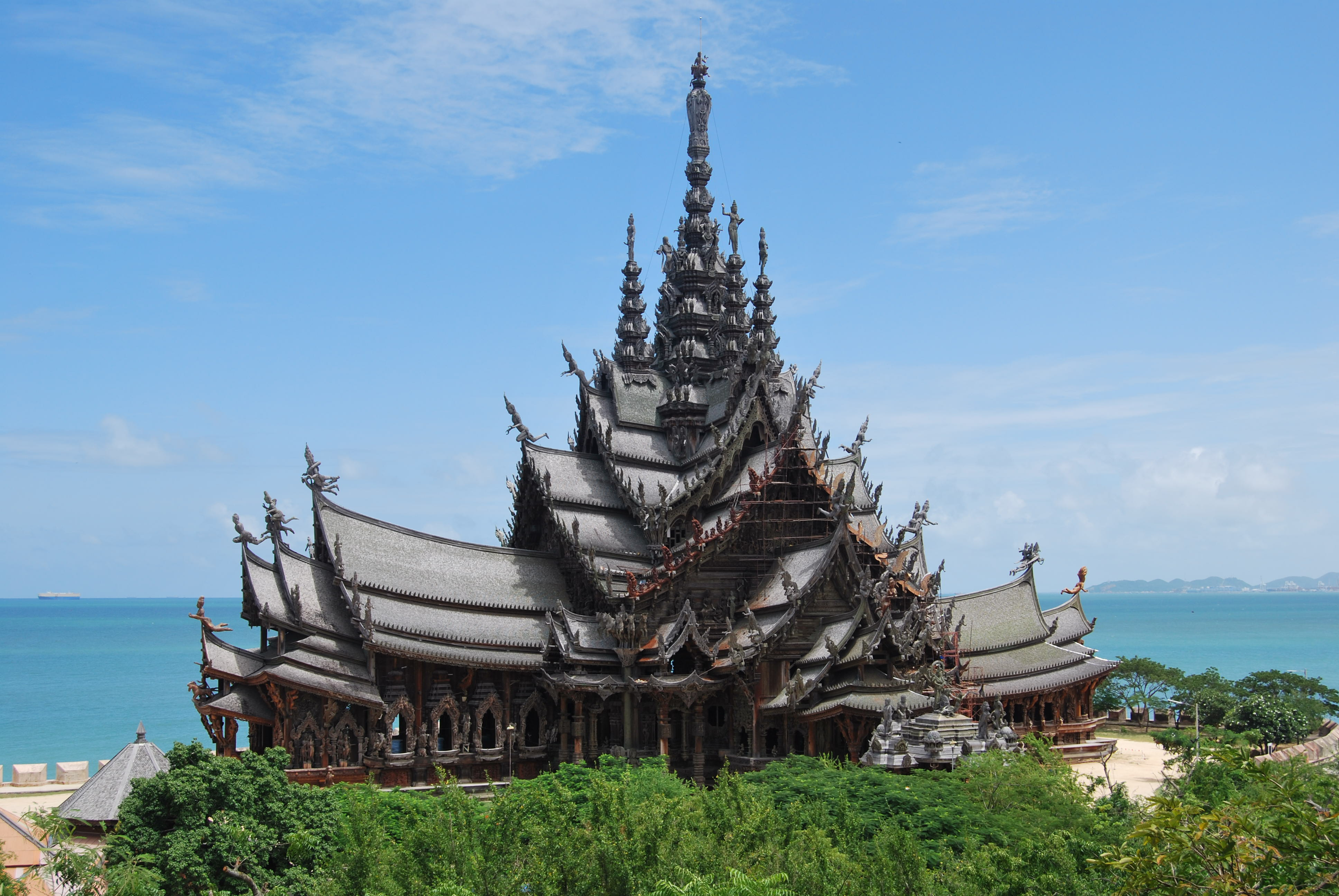
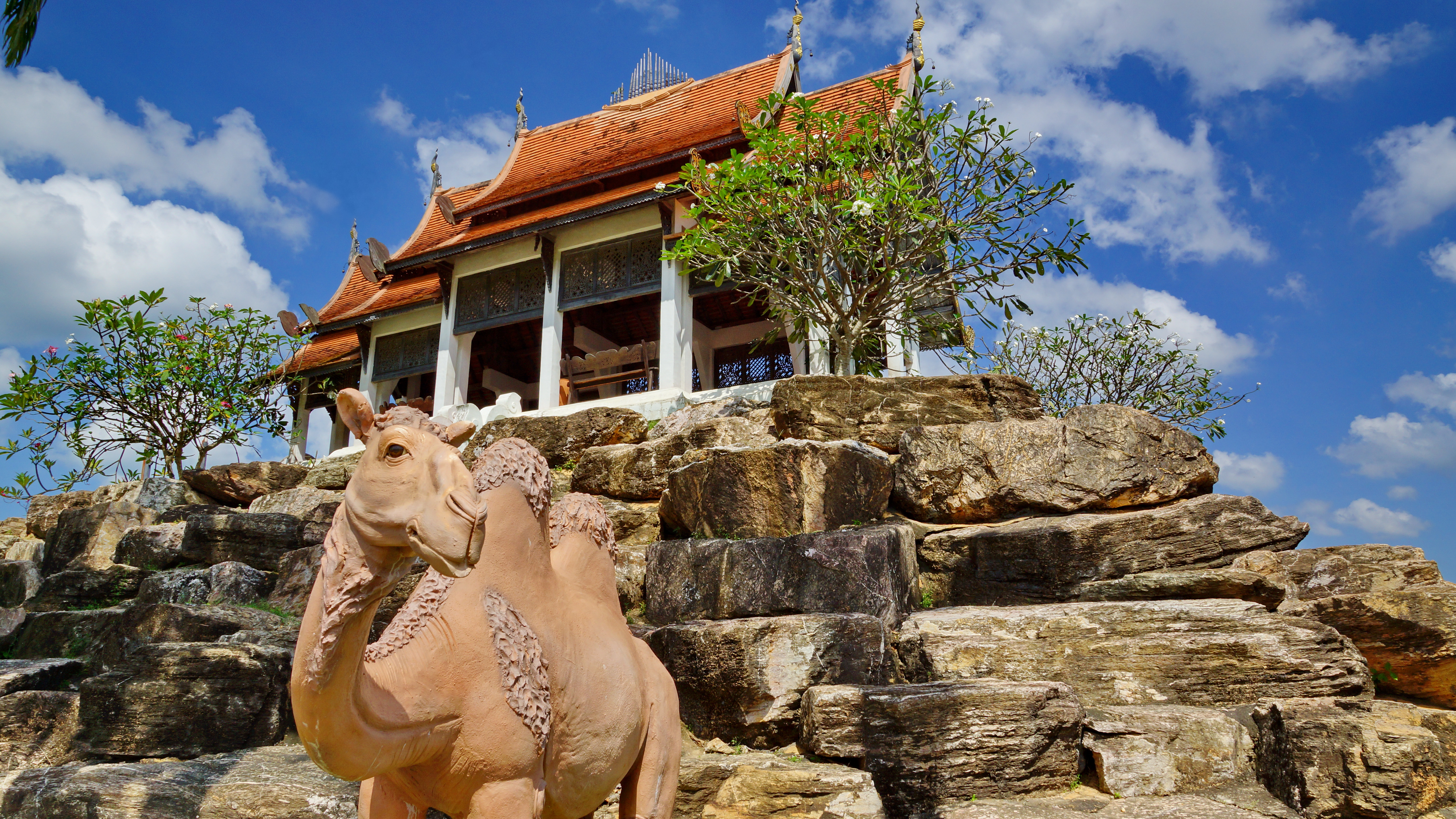
- From top: View of Pattaya skyline, Sanctuary of Truth, Phra Chuthathut Palace of Ko Sichang

- Flag Seal
- Mottoes: ทะเลงาม ข้าวหลามอร่อย อ้อยหวาน จักสานดี ประเพณีวิ่งควาย ("Beautiful seas. Delicious Khao Lam. Sweet sugar cane. Fine weaving. The buffalo racing festival.")
- Location within Thailand
- Coordinates: 13°13′N 101°11′E
- Country: Thailand
- Region: Eastern Thailand
- Capital: Chonburi
- Largest City: Si Racha
- Settled: c. 7th century, as Phrarot city
- Founded as city: 1897–1932
- Founded as province: 1933

Government
  - Type: Province and Provincial Administrative Organization
  - Body: Chonburi Province and Chonburi Provincial Administrative Organization
  - Governor: Naris Niramaiwong
  - PAO Chief Executive: Wittaya Khunpluem

Area
  - Province: 4,508 km^{2} (1,741 sq mi)
  - Rank: 47th
- Elevation: 50 m (160 ft)

Population (2024)
  - Province: ▲1,635,525
  - Rank: 6th
  - Density: 363/km^{2} (940/sq mi)
  - Rank: 10th

Human Achievement Index
  - HAI (2022): 0.6896 "high" Ranked 1st

GDP
  - Total: baht 976 billion (US$33 billion) (2019)
- Time zone: UTC+07:00 (ICT)
- Postal code: 20xxx
- Calling code: 038
- ISO 3166 code: TH-20
- Website: chonburi.go.th chon.go.th

Chonburi (Thai: ชลบุรี, RTGS: Chon Buri, [tɕ͡ʰōn bū.rīː]) is a province of Thailand (changwat) located in eastern Thailand. Its capital is also named Chonburi. Neighbouring provinces are (clockwise from north) Chachoengsao, Chanthaburi, and Rayong, while the Bay of Bangkok is to the west. Pattaya, a major tourism destination in Thailand, is located in Chonburi, along with Laem Chabang, the country's primary seaport. The population has grown rapidly and stands at about 1.7 million, a large part of it floating or unregistered. The registered population as of 31 December 2024 was 1.635 million.

Settlement in the province reaches back to the Neolithic. Two towns of the Dvaravati period, Mueang Phra Rot and Mueang Sri Phalo, stood near the mouth of the Bang Pakong, and wrecks carrying copper ingots have been recovered off the coast. Ko Sichang served as a royal retreat from 1892. Some nine million visitors were recorded in the province in 2012.

== Toponymy ==
The Thai word chon (ชล /t͡ɕʰon˧/) originates from the Sanskrit word jalá (जल) meaning "water", and the word buri (บุรี; /bu˨˩.riː˧/) from Sanskrit purī (पुरी); meaning "town" or "city"; hence the name of the province means "city of water". The local Chinese name for the province is 萬佛歲; Bān-pu̍t-sòe, which is a rendering of "Bang Pla Soi" (บางปลาสร้อย), the former name of Mueang Chonburi district. The name is still carried by one of that district's subdistricts. The standard Chinese name for the province is a phonetic rendering of "Chonburi", 春武里; Chhun-bú-lí.

== History ==
Historical affiliations

Dvaravati 600s–1000s
Khmer Empire 802–1052
Kingdom of Lavo 1052–1351
Kingdom of Ayutthaya 1351–1767
Kingdom of Thonburi 1767–1782
Kingdom of Siam 1782–1932
Kingdom of Thailand 1932–present

Human habitation of the province dates back to the Neolithic era, when early inhabitants lived in the area along the Panthong river in modern day Phan Thong district.

During the Dvaravati period, the city of Mueang Phra Rot (Phra That Noen That) was established close to the mouth of the Bang Pakong River in modern-day Phanat Nikhom District. The city was in the shape of an irregular rectangle and was surrounded by a moat. Mueang Phra Rot was established from the 600s to the 1000s and had goods imported from the Tang and Song dynasties and from either Persia or lower Mesopotamia. Patcharaporn Ngernkerd and colleagues make it one of four central towns in a survey of fifteen moated sites of eastern Thailand, measuring 1.19 km² within its moat. They place it on a former shoreline of the Gulf of Thailand, occupied since at least the sixth century, and report a late Dvaravati stupa outside the moats and a vanaspati. On their reading the town seems to have been under the rule of Si Mahosot in Prachin Buri. A Buddhist votive tablet in Old Mon, DW.38, is recorded from Wat Mon Nang in the province.

To the east of Phra Rot was Mueang Sri Phalo in modern-day Nong Mai Daeng, which was established near the end of Phra Rot in the 1000s.

Two wrecks off the province carried cargoes of copper ingots with datable ceramic assemblages, at Rang Kwian and at Ko Si Chang. Suthipob Chantrapakajee sets them beside a third at Bang Krachai in Chanthaburi, and notes that no evidence shows Ayutthaya smelting copper or iron ingots from domestic ore for export; Dutch and Japanese lists treat both as imports. Located near the mouth of the Bang Pakong river, it became a wealthy port and fishing town, serving as a stopping point for Khmer, Vietnamese and Chinese barques before they ventured into the Chao Phraya river. However, it lost prominence in the 1300s when the mouth of the river became shallower due to sedimentation. As a result in the town's economy declining, its inhabitants moved south to Bang Pla Soi. Construction of Sukhimvit road erased the town's eastern wall.

In the reign of King Nangklao, Phra Intha-asa, governor of Phanat Nikhom and a member of the Nakhon Phanom royal house, brought two groups of settlers to Phanat Nikhom. The first were Lao of Nakhon Phanom brought from Samut Prakan, known as Lao Asa Pak Nam; the second were newer arrivals from Nakhon Phanom itself. The Siamese King at the time allowed them to establish a habitat between Chonburi and Chachoengsao (Named Phanat Nikhom in the present).

In 1892, Ko Sichang, an island off the mainland, served as a holiday point for King Chulalongkorn and his wife Queen Saovabha Phongsri. Chulalongkorn later built a summer palace called "Phra Chuthathut Palace" named after his son, Prince Chudadhuj Dharadilok, who was born on Ko Sichang. During the Franco-Siamese crisis of 1893, the island was occupied by the French. During this time, the island was a part of Samut Prakan province before being transferred to Chonburi province on 1 January 1943 as a minor district (king amphoe) in Si Racha district. Ko Sichang became its own district on 4 July 1994.

Following the end of World War II, coastal towns particularly Ang Sila witnessed an influx of Teochew Chinese migrants. The Vietnam War would also cause an influx of American G.I.s to arrive, particularly in Pattaya. This would go on to lead Chonburi province to become popular among foreign tourists.

== Symbols ==
The provincial seal shows the hill Khao Sam Muk. On it stands a sala holding a statue of the goddess Chao Mae Sahm Muk, who is held to protect seafarers and the local population.

The provincial tree and flower is the New Guinea rosewood (Pterocarpus indicus, called Mai Pradu in Thai). The provincial aquatic life is bamboo shark Chiloscyllium punctatum.

The provincial motto is "Beautiful seas. Delicious Khao Lam. Sweet sugar cane. Fine weaving. The buffalo racing festival."

== Geography ==
The province is on the Bay of Bangkok, the northern end of the Gulf of Thailand. The Khao Khiao mountain range stretches from the northwest to the southeast of the province. The plains of the north were long used for farming. Laem Chabang, between Chonburi and Pattaya, is one of the few deep-water harbours of Thailand. The total forest area is 551 km^{2} (213 sq mi) or 12.2 percent of provincial area.

=== Wildlife sanctuary ===
There is one wildlife sanctuary, along with three other wildlife sanctuaries, make up region 2 (Si Racha) of Thailand's protected areas.

- Khao Khio–Khao Chomphu Wildlife Sanctuary, 145 km^{2} (56 sq mi)

The provincial permanent legal population rose at nearly four per cent annually, from 1,040,865 in 2000 to 1,554,365 in 2010. There is a large floating population of long-term non-Thai residents without permanent status, on a perpetual tourist visa and/or migrant workers (legal or not), as well as heavy, short-term tourist influxes.

== Demographics ==
=== Religion ===
According to a 2015 survey, around 97.87% of the population of Chonburi practices Buddhism, followed by Islam with 1.56% and Christianity with 0.60%.

Religion	Census 2015	%
Buddhism	1,256,081	97.87%
Islam	20,000	1.56%
Christianity	7,707	0.60%
Other religions	800	0.06%

Religion in Chonburi (census 2015)
1. Buddhism (97.9%)
2. Islam (1.56%)
3. Christianity (0.60%)
4. Other (0.06%)

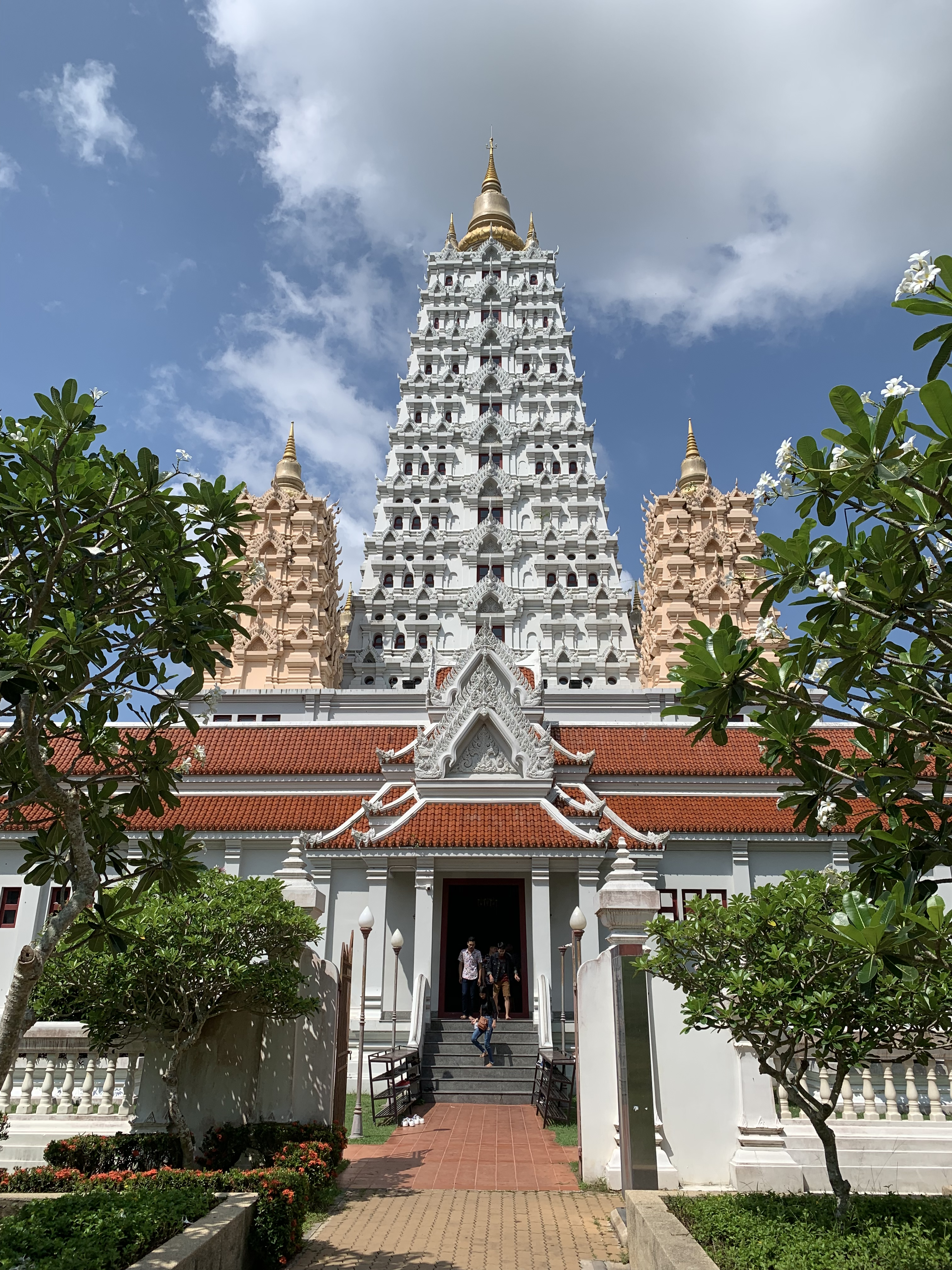
Wat Ñanasamvara Woramahawihan in Huai Yai, Bang Lamung.

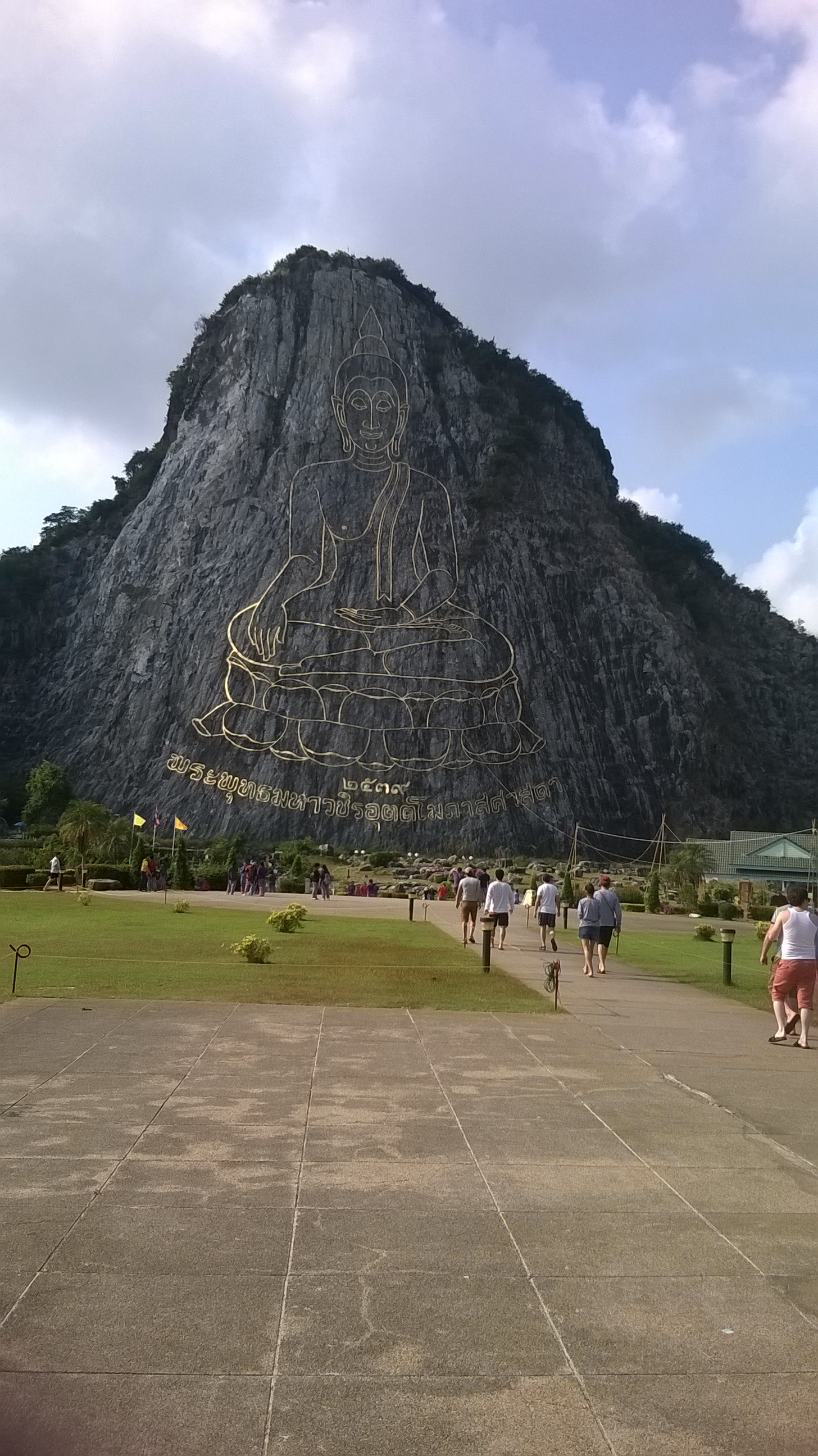
Khao Chi Chan in Na Chom Thian, Bang Lamung.

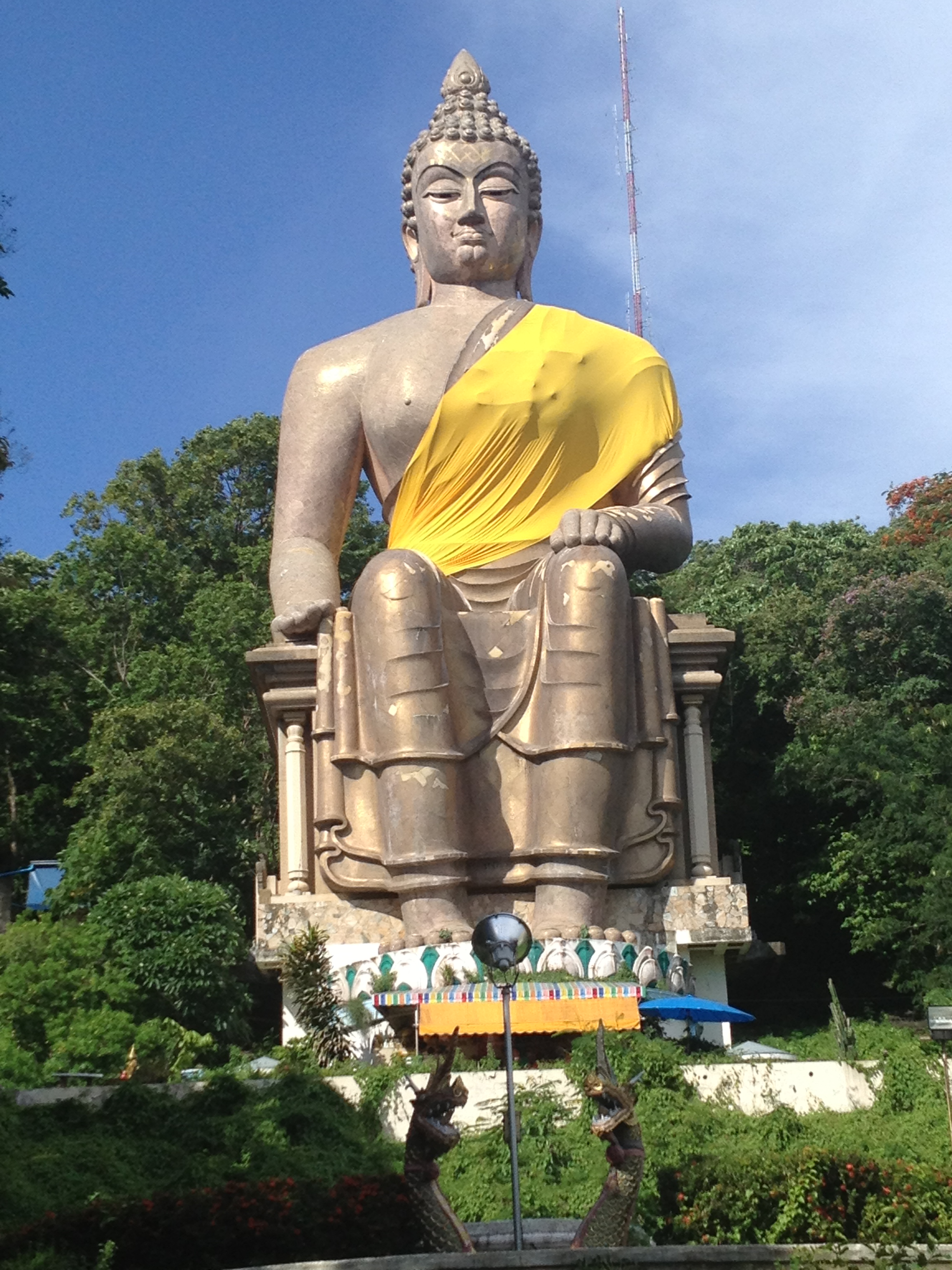
Wat Tham Nimit in Ban Suan, Chonburi.

Wat Khao Phra Bat in Pattaya, Bang Lamung.

== Administrative divisions ==
=== Provincial government ===
Chonburi province consists of 11 districts (amphoe). These are further subdivided into 92 subdistricts (tambon) and 710 villages (muban).

- Pattaya is a special governed city in Bang Lamung district.
- Laem Chabang is a port city municipality in Si Racha and Bang Lamung districts.

Map	#	Name	Thai	Population (2018)	Subdivisions
— Districts —
	1	Mueang Chonburi	เมืองชลบุรี	335,063	18 tambon — 107 muban
	2	Ban Bueng	บ้านบึง	103,377	8 tambon — 52 muban
	3	Nong Yai	หนองใหญ่	23,625	5 tambon — 24 muban
	4	Bang Lamung	บางละมุง	315,437	8 tambon — 72 muban
	5	Phan Thong	พานทอง	69,429	11 tambon — 76 muban
	6	Phanat Nikhom	พนัสนิคม	124,637	20 tambon — 185 muban
	7	Si Racha	ศรีราชา	301,799	8 tambon — 73 muban
	8	Ko Sichang	เกาะสีชัง	4,560	1 tambon — 7 muban
	9	Sattahip	สัตหีบ	165,492	5 tambon — 40 muban
	10	Bo Thong	บ่อทอง	50,318	6 tambon — 47 muban
	11	Ko Chan	เกาะจันทร์	37,670	2 tambon — 27 muban

=== Local government ===
The local governments are overseen by the Pattaya City Special Local Government in Pattaya and the Chonburi Provincial Administrative Organisation (CPOA, ongkan borihan suan changwat chonburi) throughout Chonburi. The 47 municipalities are split up into two city municipalities (thesaban nakhon), 10 town municipalities (thesaban mueang), and 35 subdistrict municipalities (thesaban tambon). Local communities are also overseen by 50 subdistrict administrative organisations (SAO, ongkan borihan suan tambon).

== Transport ==
=== Road ===
The Bangkok-Chonburi-Pattaya Motorway (Hwy 7) is linked with Bangkok's Outer Ring Road (Hwy 9) with another intersection at Si Nakharin and Rama IX Junction.

The Bang Na-Trat Highway (Hwy 34) from Bang Na travels through Bang Phli and crosses the Bang Pakong River into Chonburi. There is a Chonburi bypass that meets Sukhumvit Road (Hwy 3), passing Bang Saen Beach, Bang Phra, Pattaya and Sattahip.

=== Airports ===
Chonburi is about 120 kilometres (75 mi) by road from Suvarnabhumi Airport (BKK), the country's largest international airport. By road, it is accessed from Sukhumvit Road and Motorway 7 from Bangkok. Chonburi is also served by scheduled flights via U-Tapao International Airport (UTP), which is a 45-minute drive south of the city.

=== Highways ===
The main road through Chonburi is Thailand Route 3, also known as Sukhumvit Road. To the northeast, it connects to Bangkok, and to the south, it connects to Rayong province, Chanthaburi province and Trat province. Route 344 leads east to Klaeng (which is also on Route 3). Route 7 runs parallel to Route 3 but bypasses the densely populated coastal area, connecting to the beach resort city of Pattaya.

=== Rail ===
The State Railway of Thailand, the national passenger rail system, provides service in the province, with the main station being Chonburi railway station.

== Health ==
Many hospitals exist in Chonburi, both public and private. Chonburi has one university hospital, Burapha University Hospital. Its main hospital operated by the Ministry of Public Health is Chonburi Hospital. Hospitals operated by other organisations, such as the Thai Red Cross Society's Queen Savang Vadhana Memorial Hospital and the Queen Sirikit Naval Hospital run by the Royal Thai Navy, are also found in the province.

== Educational facilities ==
=== Universities ===
- Burapha University (BUU)
- Kasetsart University Si Racha Campus (KU SRC)
- Rajamangala University of Technology Tawan-ok (RMUTTO)
- Sripatum University Chonburi Campus (SPU)
- Thailand National Sports University (TNSU)
- Thammasat University Pattaya Campus (TU)

=== Colleges ===
- Graduate School of Public Administration, National Institute of Development Administration (GSPA NIDA)
- Interior College (IC)
- Panyapiwat Institute of Management (PIM)

== Human achievement index 2022 ==
Health	Education	Employment	Income
5	2	1	4
Housing	Family	Transport	Participation
72	16	34	69
Province Chonburi, with an HAI 2022 value of 0.6896 is "high", occupies place 1 in the ranking.

Since 2003, the United Nations Development Programme (UNDP) in Thailand has tracked progress on human development at a sub-national level using the Human achievement index (HAI), a composite index covering all eight key areas of human development. The National Economic and Social Development Board (NESDB) has taken over this task since 2017.

Rank	Classification
1–13	"High"
14–29	"Somewhat high"
30–45	"Average"
46–61	"Somewhat low"
62–77	"Low"

Map with provinces and HAI 2022 rankings

== Tourism ==
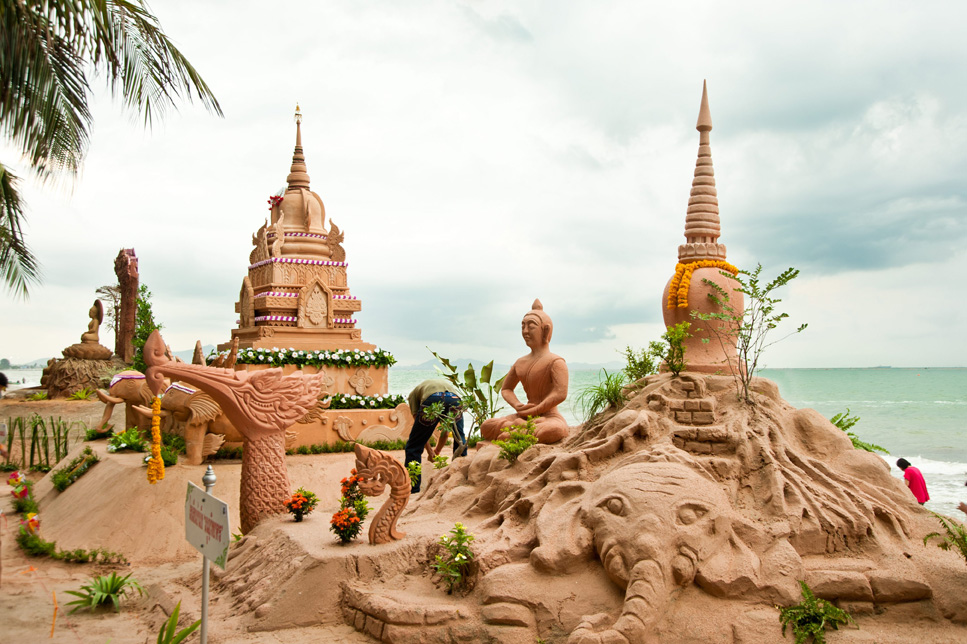
Sand pagodas in the 2018 Wan Lai festival during Songkran

Some nine million visitors to the province were recorded in 2012, of which 6.1 million were from abroad, 2.2 million of these being Russian.

The Chonburi Buffalo Race (งานประเพณีวิ่งควาย) is held in the districts of Ban Bueng and Nong Yai. Owners dress the animals for the occasion, and the buffaloes are assembled in the courtyard in front of the town hall for racing and for fitness and fashion contests. The Chonburi Buffalo Race festival started over 100 years ago. The races are accompanied by booths selling local goods, stage performances, games and beauty contests. The annual Buffalo Race is held around the 11th lunar month, normally in October. It takes seven days and takes place on the field in front of the city and provincial government offices. The race itself is run on the last two days. This race is 100 metres (110 yd) long. The prize for the first nose past the finish line is a trophy and some money.

Songkran day in Bangsaen (Ko Phra Sai Wan Lai Bangsaen) is a tradition that has been held continuously for over ten years at Bang Saen Beach and Laem Thaen. The event takes place between April 16–17 of each year. The highlight of this event is a contest in which the contestants build a sand Buddha at Bangsaen Beach. In each Buddha sand arch is a decoration. The combination of the sea atmosphere and Thai decorations has helped this become one of the most popular Songkran festivals in Thailand. Other activities also take place, such as meriting alms to monks, bathing Buddha images, pouring water on the elders, traditional sporting events, sea boxing competitions, and oyster sheep competitions. Seafood and local food are often sold, along with other local products as part of One Tambon One Product (OTOP). Well-known artists have also given concerts at the event.

== See also ==
- Chonburi F.C.
- Sriracha F.C.
- Pattaya United F.C.
- Supreme Chonburi VC
