= Timeline of the 2020 Thai protests (July 2020) =

== Three Demands ==
The nationwide protests are centred around the three demands given on 18 July by the Free Youth group, though some have their own custom demands, such as the Seri Thoey group. These three core demands are:

1. “The parliament must be dissolved." — due to failed government management of the COVID-19 pandemic, rising unemployment rate, and the closing of many businesses. The government was also accused of failing to deal with "VIP” cases of COVID-19 that were allowed into the country without quarantine.
2. “Stop threatening the citizens" — since the 2019 Thai general election, many have been threatened for criticising the government.
3. "New constitution" — the current constitution, which was drafted by Prayut's allies, paved the way for him or any future soldier-turned-politician to remain in power. Many who campaigned against this constitution earlier in the 2016 referendum were arrested or threatened.

A Free Youth leader stated that they do not aim to overthrow the monarchy, as others have alleged.

== Protests under Three Demands ==
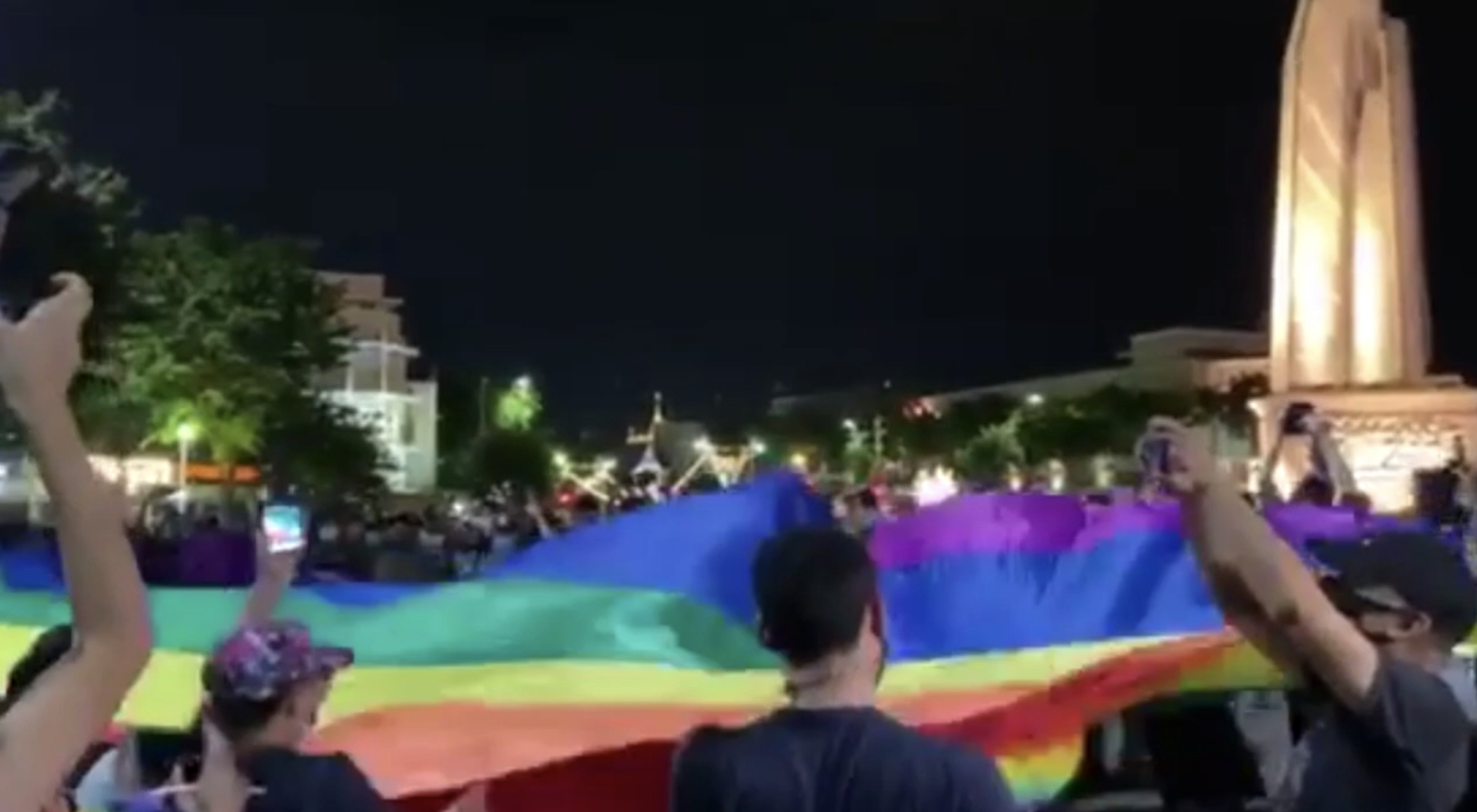
Seri Thoey group flew the LGBT flag during the protest on 25 July

On 18 July, Thailand saw the largest street demonstration since the 2014 Thai coup d'état at the Democracy Monument in Bangkok with around 2,500 protesters. The protesters, organised under the name Free Youth (Thai: เยาวชนปลดแอก; RTGS: yaowachon plot aek), announced the three aforementioned demands. The event was triggered by the failed economy of the country due to pandemic, and unjustified implementation of the Emergency Decree that was heavily criticised as being a tool against any possible protest. The gathering was planned to last overnight and disband on the next day. However, it was cancelled by midnight for security reasons. Charnvit Kasetsiri, Thai historian, warned the protestors that they should not stay overnight, so as to prevent the tragedy of Thammasat University massacre of 1976.

After 18 July, the protests soon spread across the country. The first were in Chiang Mai province and Ubon Ratchathani Province on 19 July. By 23 July, demonstrations had been organised in more than 20 provinces.

On 22 July, a group of activists from Srinakharinwirot University (SWU) under the name "SWU Generation of Change" (มศว คนรุ่นเปลี่ยน) organised a protest at the Democracy Monument claiming that they were “extolling the beauty of the newly created garden”, mocking the potted plants placed around the Democracy Monument by the Bangkok Metropolitan Administration brought around 18 July to block protesters from entering. The potted plants were removed a few days later.

On 25 July, a group of LGBT people, organised under the name Seri Thoey (lit. Free Thoey; parody to the Seri Thai - Free Thai Movement), demonstrated at the Democracy Monument calling for legalisation of same-sex marriage in addition to the three demands given earlier. The mob was highly praised online for using parodies of memorable kathoey gags from the famed kathoey comedy horror film Hor Taew Taek (Haunting Me). Thai youth activist Netiwit Chotiphatphaisal commented that 25 July protest was full of creativity, including colourful outfits, colourful hair, distinct personal style and marked by a few choice words. He considered it a "landmark moment" in recent Thai political protests.

On 26 July, an event called “Let’s run, Hamtaro” was organised at the Democracy Monument. Having begun as online activism that spread on Twitter, it eventually gathered around 3,000 people. The event consisted of running around the monument whilst singing a jingle from Hamtaro, a famous Japanese cartoon, with some satirical amendments to the lyrics on political corruption. The well-known lyrics from Hamtaro; “the most yummy things of all are... sunflower seeds!”, was amended to “the most yummy things of all are.... citizens’ taxes!”. The parody was used initially in a protest at Triam Udom Suksa School in Bangkok few days earlier. The video of students singing the jingle soon spread online and eventually inspired the running event.

On 30 July, two vocational student groups held a demonstration: the royalist "Vocation [students] Help the Nation" group accused the protesters of attempting to "overthrow the monarchy", while the groups "Vocation [students] for the People" and "Cogs of Democracy" sided with the protesters.

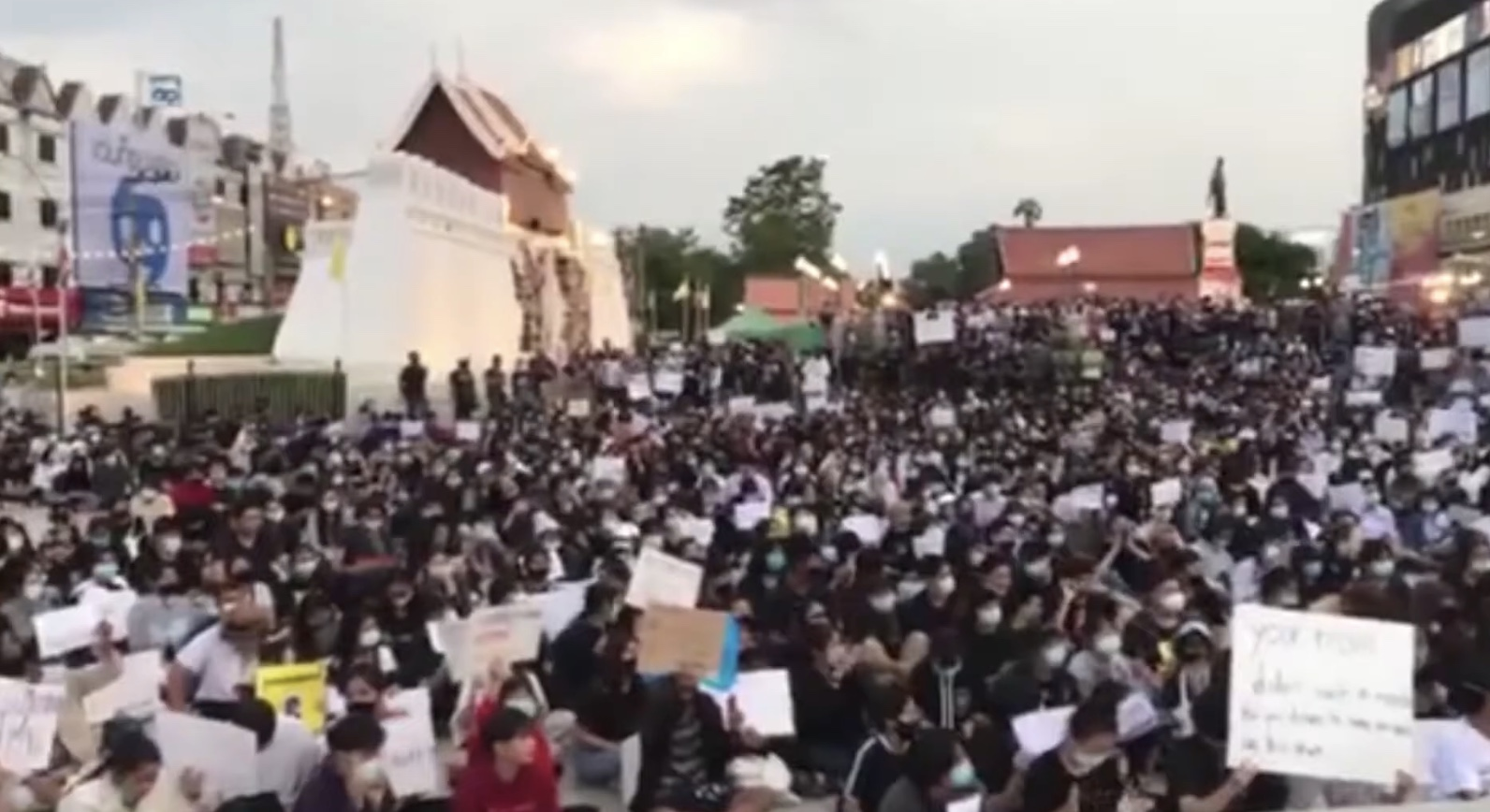
Sits-in at Nakhon Ratchasima Province on 24 July

Each with its own satirical names, some major ones are:

- 19 July, Tha Phae Gate, Chiang Mai Province — joined by Free Youth and students from Chiang Mai University.
- 19 July, City Pillar Shrine, Ubon Ratchathani Province — peaceful demonstration organised by students and staff of Ubon Ratchathani University
- 22 July, MSU, Maha Sarakham Province — Protesters announced 4 demands to the government, namely the three demands and election under the 1997 Constitution. Its hashtag #IsanSibothon quickly trended first on Twitter in Thailand.
- 22 July, Laem Thaen, Bang Saen Beach, Chonburi Province — organised under the idea of “trash-collecting” activity. Its leader admitted that “trash” stood for the current government. The protest saw some participants being investigated and treated unlawfully by the police officers. Videos circulated online infuriated many.
- 24 July, Thao Suranari Square, Nakhon Ratchasima Province — sit-ins organised by a group of students and lecturers from four academies in the province. It saw one of the largest crowds amongst other protests.

On 27 and 29 July, Thais in Paris, New York City and London also protested against the Prayut government.
