= Sisaket Hospital =

Hospital in Thailand

Sisaket Hospital โรงพยาบาลศรีสะเกษ
- The Ministry of Public Health Health District 10

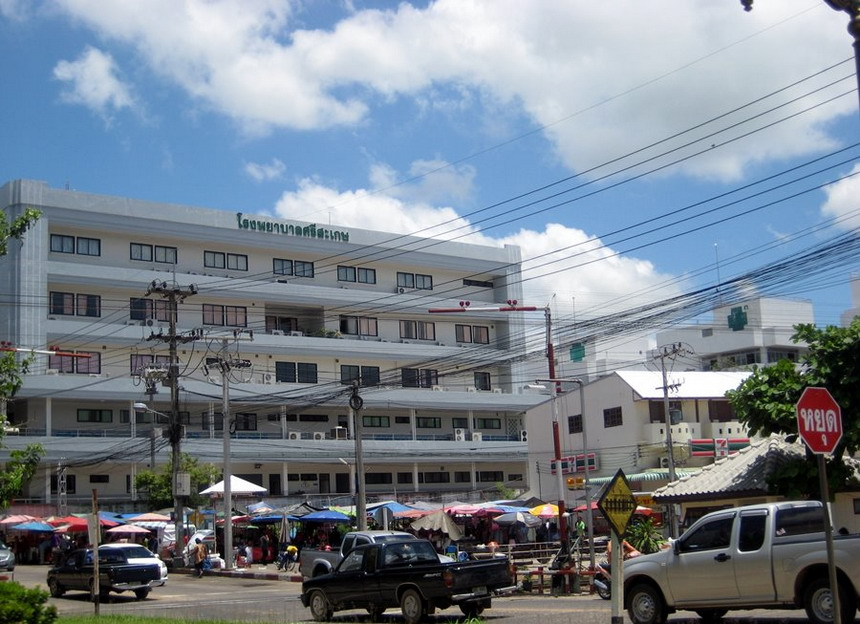

Geography
- Location: 0859 Kasikam Road, Mueang Tai Subdistrict, Mueang Sisaket District, Sisaket 33000, Thailand
- Coordinates: 15°6′57″N 104°19′13″E

Organisation
- Type: Regional
- Affiliated university: College of Medicine and Public Health, Ubon Ratchathani University

Services
- Beds: 809

History
- Former names: Khukhan Health Station; Sisaket Health Station
- Opened: 1 December 1948 (as Sisaket Hospital)

Links
- Website: www.sskh.moph.go.th
- Lists: Hospitals in Thailand

Sisaket Hospital (Thai: โรงพยาบาลศรีสะเกษ) is the main hospital of Sisaket Province, Thailand. It is classified under the Ministry of Public Health as a regional hospital. It has a CPIRD Medical Education Center which trains doctors for the College of Medicine and Public Health of Ubon Ratchathani University.

== History ==
Khukhan Health Station was opened in 1908 to serve the citizens of Khukhan Province (the former name of Sisaket Province). It was refurbished in 1934. In 1938, Khukhan Province was renamed Sisaket Province and the health station was therefore renamed Sisaket Health Station. The hospital was further expanded during the First Indochina War and World War II as a military base was established in the area. On 1 December 1948, the health station was officially elevated to hospital level and renamed Sisaket Hospital. In 1998, the hospital made an agreement to train medical students and act as a clinical teaching hospital for the College of Medicine and Public Health, Ubon Ratchathani University under the Collaborative Project to Increase Production of Rural Doctors (CPIRD) program.

== See also ==
- Healthcare in Thailand
- Hospitals in Thailand
- List of hospitals in Thailand
