= College of Medicine and Public Health, Ubon Ratchathani University =

College in Ubon Ratchathani Province, Thailand

- วิทยาลัยแพทยศาสตร์และการสาธารณสุข มหาวิทยาลัยอุบลราชธานี
- Type: Public (non-profit)
- Established: 17 December 2002
- Parent institution: Ubon Ratchathani University
- Dean: Pravi Ampan, M.D.
- Location: 85 Sathonlamark Road, Sri Kai Subdistrict, Warin Chamrap District, Ubon Ratchathani 34190, Thailand
- Colors: Green
- Website: http://www.cmp.ubu.ac.th/newweb/index.php

The College of Medicine and Public Health, Ubon Ratchathani University (Thai: วิทยาลัยแพทยศาสตร์และการสาธารณสุข มหาวิทยาลัยอุบลราชธานี) is a medical and public health school in Warin Chamrap District, Ubon Ratchathani Province, Thailand.

== History ==
The College of Medicine and Public Health, Ubon Ratchathani University was founded on 17 December 2002, following a meeting with Sunpasithiprasong Hospital, the Faculty of Medicine, Khon Kaen University and Ubon Ratchathani University, with the goal of increasing the provision of education for medical and healthcare personnel in the South Isan region. On 8 November 2003, the Medical Doctor (MD) course was approved by the Medical Council of Thailand and in 2005, the BSc in Public Health course was approved as well.

== Education ==
Undergraduate Programs

- Doctor of Medicine Program
- Bachelor of Science Program in Environmental Health
- Bachelor of Public Health Program in Public Health

Postgraduate Programs

- Master of Science Program in Biomedical Science
- Master of Public Health Program in Public Health
- Doctor of Philosophy Program in Biomedical Science
- Doctor of Public Health Program

== Main Teaching Hospitals ==
- Ubon Ratchathani University Hospital
- Sunpasitthiprasong Hospital (CPIRD), Ubon Ratchathani Province
- Sisaket Hospital (CPIRD), Sisaket Province

== See also ==
- List of medical schools in Thailand
