= Udon Thani Hospital =

Udon Thani Hospital โรงพยาบาลอุดรธานี
- The Ministry of Public Health Health District 8

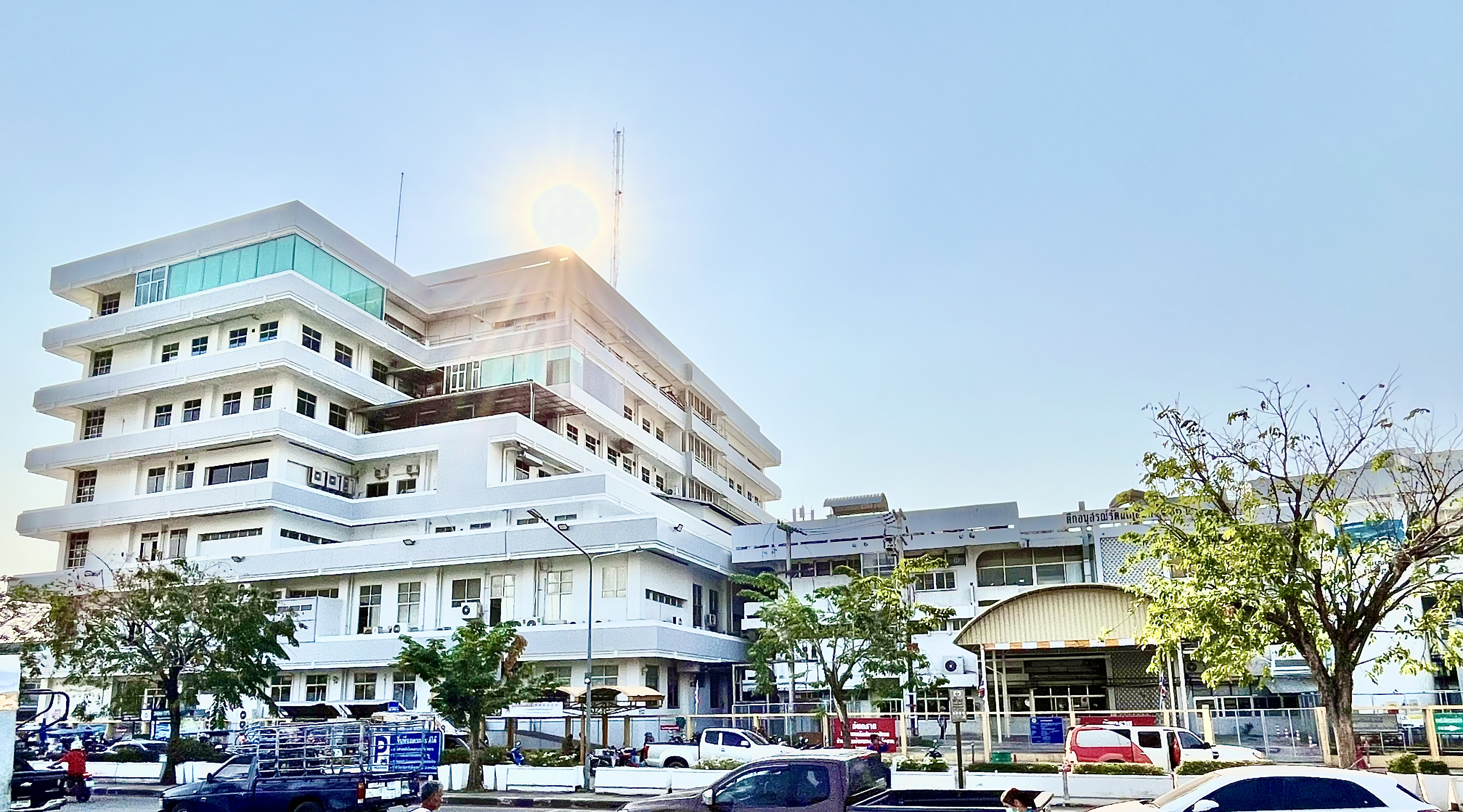

Geography
- Location: 33 Pho Niyom Road, Ban Lueam Subdistrict, Mueang Udon Thani District, Udon Thani 41000, Thailand
- Coordinates: 17.414877°N 102.780423°E

Organisation
- Type: Regional
- Affiliated university: Faculty of Medicine, Khon Kaen University

Services
- Beds: 1154

History
- Opened: 24 April 1954

Links
- Website: www.udh.go.th
- Lists: Hospitals in Thailand

Udon Thani Hospital (Thai: โรงพยาบาลอุดรธานี) is the main hospital of Udon Thani Province, Thailand and is classified under the Ministry of Public Health as a regional hospital. It has a CPIRD Medical Education Center which trains doctors for the Faculty of Medicine of Khon Kaen University.

== History ==
Udon Thani Hospital was built on land initially owned by the Ministry of Education which was used as housing for staff under the ministry working in Monthon Udon. When the housing turned to disuse, this land was transferred to the MOPH in 1951 and designated for the construction of a hospital. However, funding was little and thus some donations were received from the Thung Sri Mueang annual festival. The hospital had its foundation stone laid on 29 June 1953 and the hospital completed and opened on 24 April 1954. In 2007, the hospital made an agreement to train medical students and act as a clinical teaching hospital for the Faculty of Medicine, Khon Kaen University and about one hundred medical students are trained here annually under the Collaborative Project to Increase Production of Rural Doctors (CPIRD) program.

== See also ==
- Healthcare in Thailand
- Hospitals in Thailand
- List of hospitals in Thailand
