= Sunpasitthiprasong Hospital =

Sunpasitthiprasong Hospital โรงพยาบาลสรรพสิทธิประสงค์
- The Ministry of Public Health Health District 10

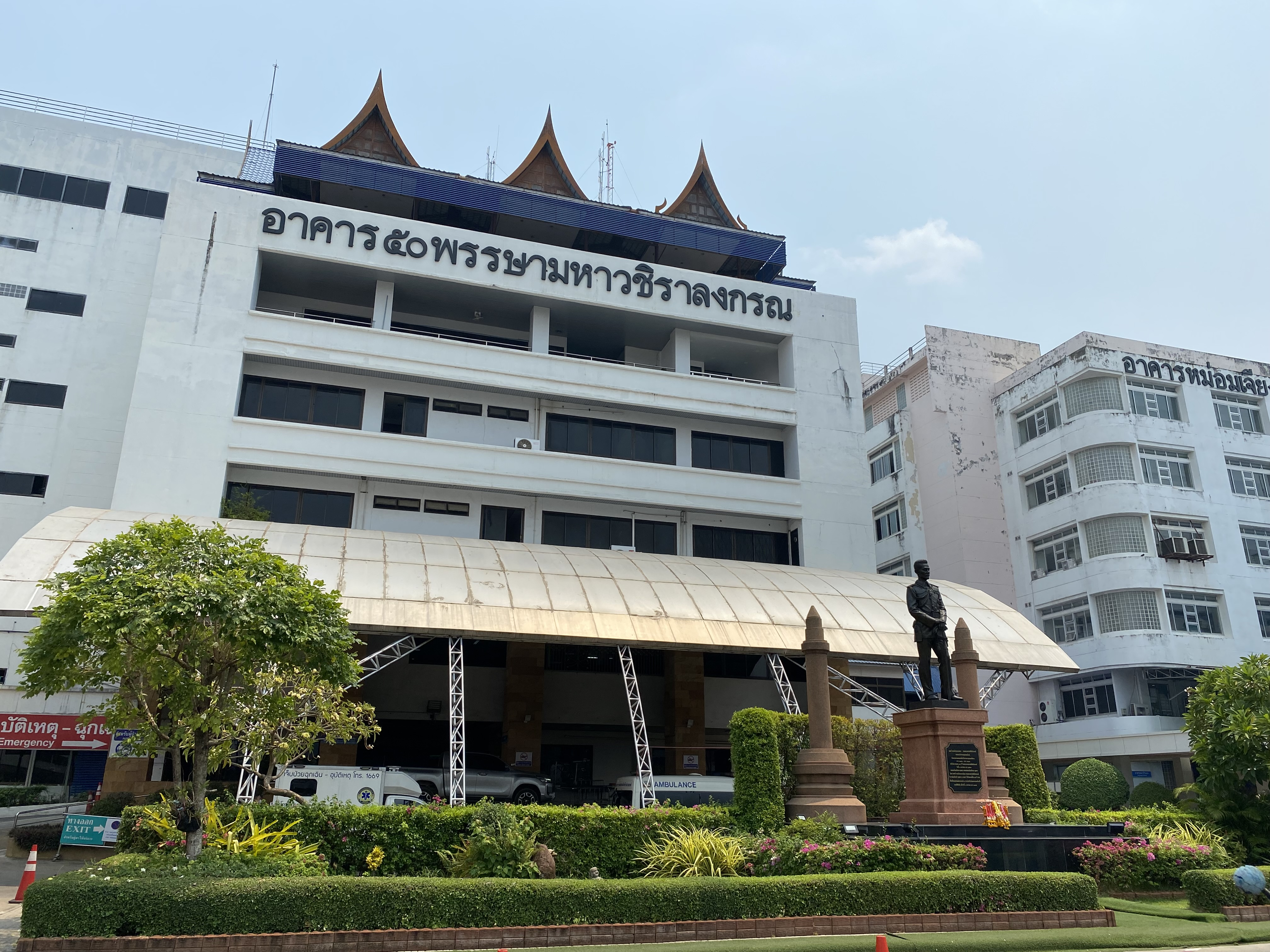

Geography
- Location: 12 Sunpasit Road, Nai Mueang Subdistrict, Mueang Ubon Ratchathani District, Ubon Ratchathani 34000, Thailand
- Coordinates: 15.236111°N 104.865453°E

Organisation
- Type: Regional
- Affiliated university: Faculty of Medicine, Khon Kaen University; College of Medicine and Public Health, Ubon Ratchathani University

Services
- Beds: 1188

History
- Former name: Ubon Ratchathani Hospital
- Opened: 3 January 1936

Links
- Website: www.sunpasit.go.th
- Lists: Hospitals in Thailand

Sunpasitthiprasong Hospital (Thai: โรงพยาบาลสรรพสิทธิประสงค์) is the main hospital of Ubon Ratchathani Province, Thailand, and is classified under the Ministry of Public Health as a regional hospital. It has a CPIRD Medical Education Center which trains doctors of the Faculty of Medicine, Khon Kaen University and the College of Medicine and Public Health, Ubon Ratchathani University.

== History ==
Following the revolution of 1932, the cabinet led a policy to expand medical services to rural parts of Thailand and to establish hospitals in provinces adjacent to the Mekong River: Nong Khai, Nakhon Phanom and Ubon Ratchathani. Mom Chao Upasisan Chumphon also donated a piece of 27 rai land for construction of a hospital only. The hospital opened as Ubon Ratchathani Hospital and was renamed to Sunpasitthiprasong Hospital in honour of Prince Sunpasitthiprasong, father of Mom Chao Upasisan and former governor of Monthon Isan.

Since 1995, the hospital became affiliated to the Faculty of Medicine, Khon Kaen University and trains students in the Collaborative Project to Increase Production of Rural Doctor (CPIRD). This was extended to the College of Medicine and Public Health, Ubon Ratchathani University on 3 September 2003.

== See also ==
- Healthcare in Thailand
- Hospitals in Thailand
- List of hospitals in Thailand
