= Yi Peng festival =

Annual festival in Northern Thailand

Yi Peng
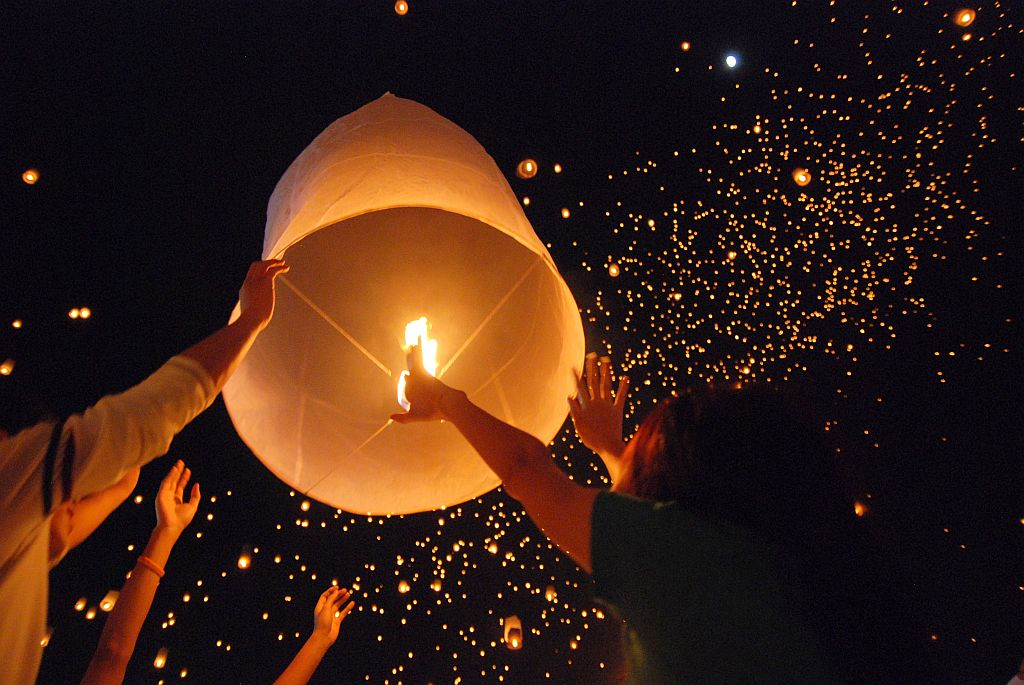
- Floating lanterns (khom loi) over Chiang Mai during Yi Peng
- Official name: ยี่เป็ง
- Also called: Yee Peng
- Type: Cultural, religious (Buddhist)
- Celebrations: Release of sky lanterns, lighting of phang pratheep (clay lamps) and hanging lanterns, merit-making at temples
- Begins: Two days before the full moon of the second month in the Lanna lunar calendar
- Date: November (varies by lunar calendar)
- Frequency: Annual

Yi Peng (Thai: ยี่เป็ง, Northern Thai: ᨿᩦ᩵ᩮᨻ᩠ᨦ), also spelled Yee Peng, is a traditional Lan Na festival celebrated in Northern Thailand. It is a festival of lights, deeply rooted in Theravada Buddhism, and is celebrated for three days, culminating on the full moon of the second month of the Lanna lunar calendar (Thai: เดือนยี่, duean yi), which typically falls in November.

The festival is most closely linked with the city of Chiang Mai, where its best-known feature is the mass release of thousands of khom loi (sky lanterns), which are believed to relieve misfortune and send wishes to the heavens. While Yi Peng is a distinct Lanna tradition, it is celebrated concurrently with the national Thai festival of Loy Krathong.

== Etymology and origin ==
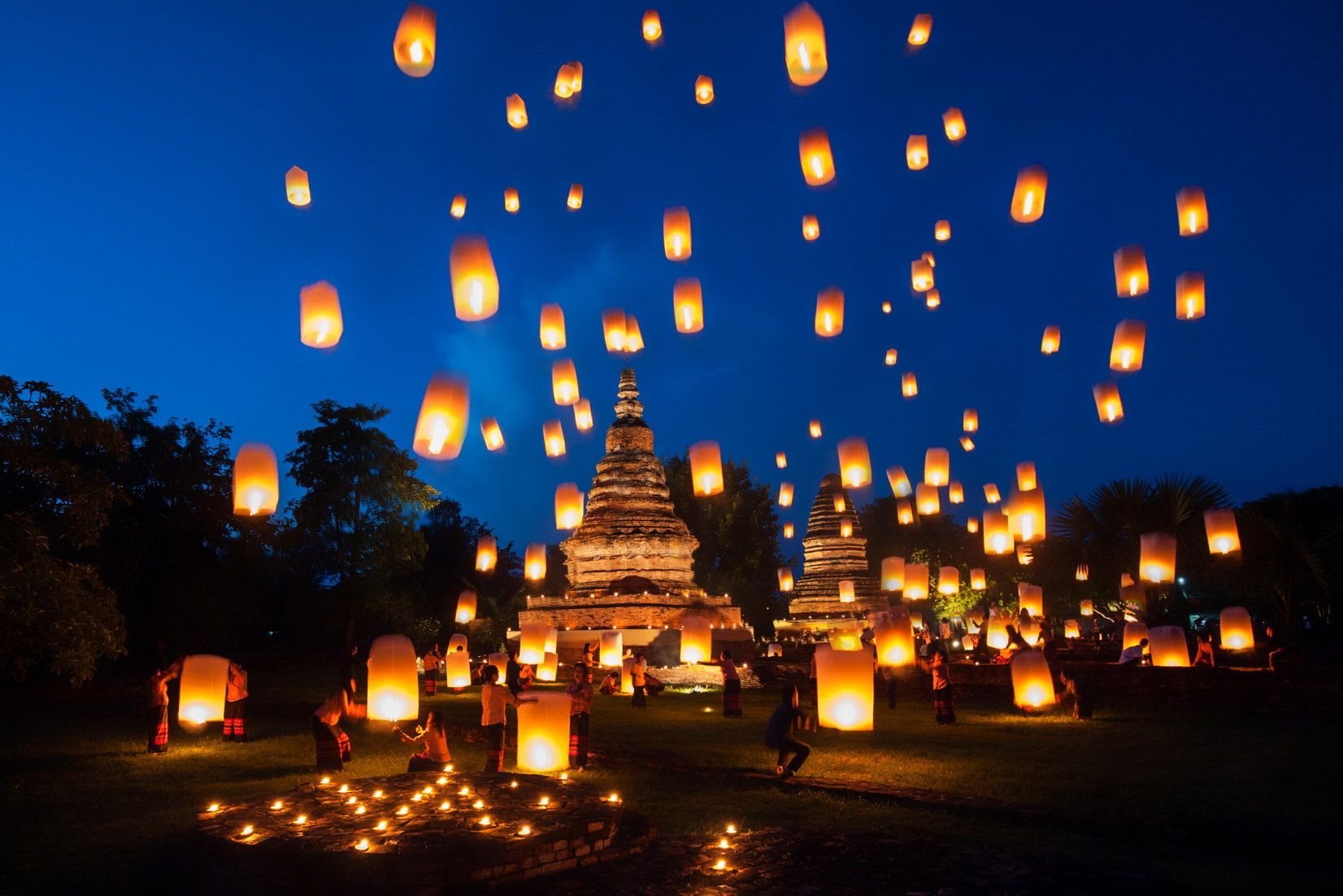
Releasing sky lanterns in Wiang Tha Kan, San Pa Tong district.

Yi means 'two' and peng means a 'full moon day'. Yi Peng refers to the full moon day in the second month according to the Lanna lunar calendar (the twelfth month of the Thai lunar calendar).

Yi Peng originated in the ancient Lan Na Kingdom (c. 13th–18th centuries) and is thought to have roots in the pre-Buddhist Haripuñjaya Kingdom (modern-day Lamphun).

According to certain accounts, the festival's origins are sometimes linked with ancient animist and Brahmanic traditions of India, although it is primarily observed today as a Buddhist custom. The festival is meant as a time to obtain Buddhist merit (ทำบุญ, tham bun). One legend tells of a flock of birds that paid homage to the Buddha by circling around him while carrying lit torches in their beaks and claws. Moved by their devotion, the Buddha proclaimed that their virtuous act would earn them rebirth endowed with beauty and good fortune. In northern Thailand, offering light to the Buddha during Yi Peng is therefore regarded as a meritorious act believed to bring purity and popularity in future lives.

== Traditions ==
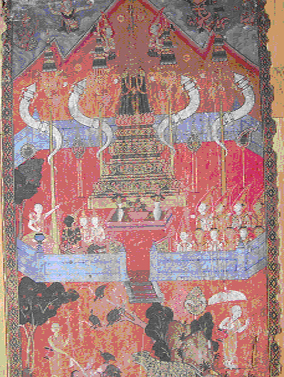
Painting of the celestial stupa Cūḷāmaṇi Cetiya in Trāyastriṃśa.

The festival is meant as a time to make merit. Swarms of sky lanterns (Thai: โคมลอย; RTGS: khom loi), literally: 'floating lanterns', are launched into the air. Khom loi are made from a thin fabric, such as rice paper, stretched over a bamboo or wire frame, to which a candle or fuel cell is attached. When the fuel cell is ignited, the heated air trapped inside the lantern creates enough lift for the khom loi to rise into the sky. During the festival, some people also decorate their houses, gardens, and temples with khom fai (Thai: โคมไฟ), intricately shaped paper lanterns that take on different forms. Khom thue (Thai: โคมถือ) are lanterns that are carried around hanging from a stick, khom khwaen (Thai: โคมแขวน) are the hanging lanterns, and khom pariwat (Thai: โคมปริวรรต) are placed at temples and revolve due to the heat of the candle inside.

The most elaborate Yi Peng celebrations can be seen in Chiang Mai, the ancient capital of the former Lanna kingdom, where now both Loy Krathong and Yi Peng are celebrated at the same time, resulting in lights floating on the waters, lights hanging from trees/buildings or standing on walls, and lights floating in the sky. The tradition of Yi Peng was also adopted by certain parts of Laos during the 16th century.

The release of the khom loi (sky lantern) is considered the most significant part of the Yi Peng Festival. The light of the lantern is offered to the heavenly stupa in Trāyastriṃśa called Phra That Kaew Chulamanee (Cūḷāmaṇi Cetiya), which is believed to enshrine a relic of the Buddha's hair. The release of a lantern is believed to free one of misfortune, bad luck, and the troubles of the past year. As the lanterns rise, people make wishes for good fortune in the year ahead and offer respect to their ancestors.

In the past, people believed that if a fire kite (wao fai) or a sky lantern landed on someone's house, the household would suffer misfortune or eventually be abandoned. It was thought that the lantern carried away the troubles of the person who released it, transferring that bad luck to wherever it fell. This belief is no longer commonly held today.

== Relationship with Loy Krathong ==
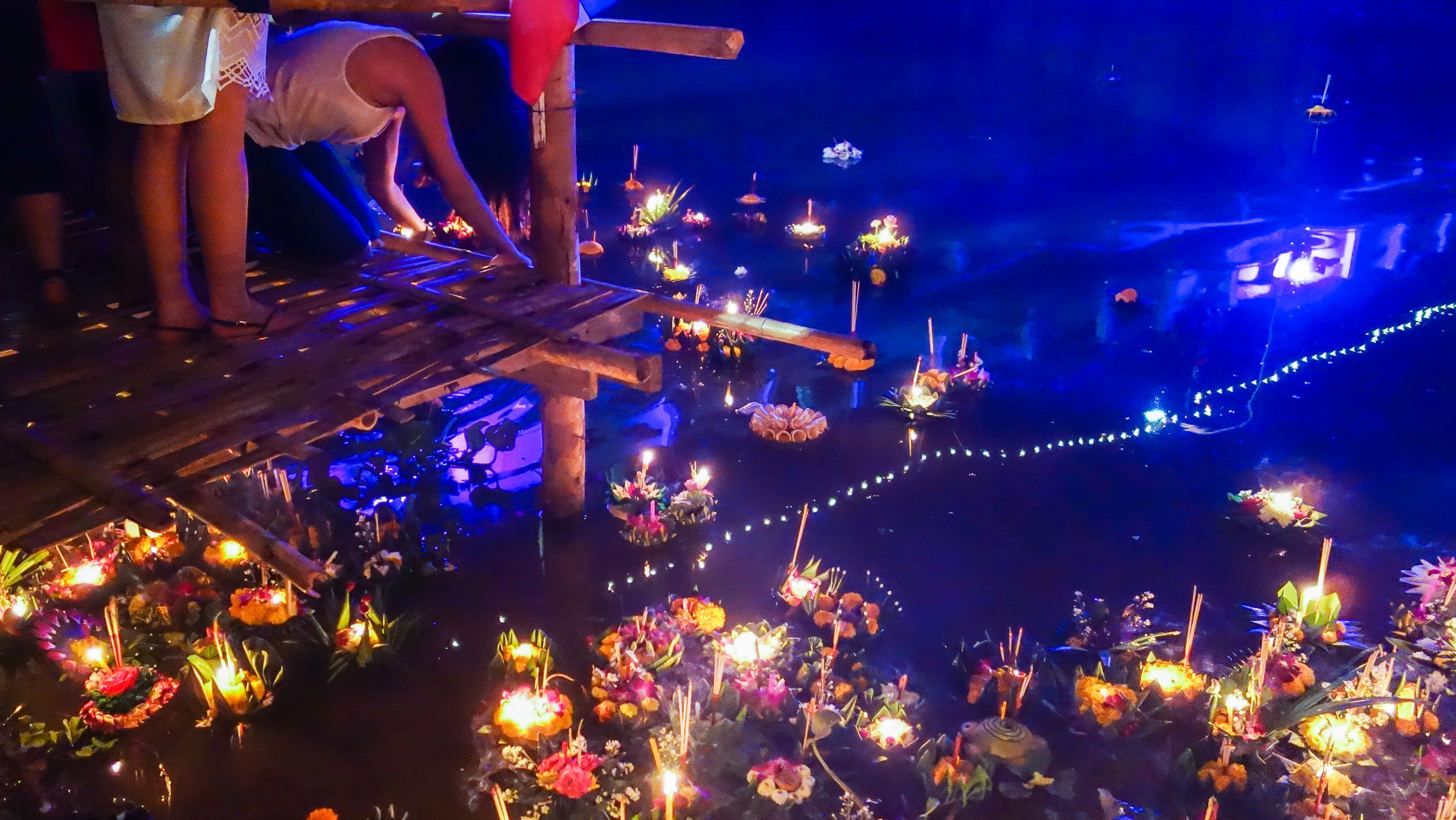
The floating of krathong rafts during Loy Krathong and Yi Peng, which are now celebrated together as a multi-day festival in Chiang Mai.

Although Yi Peng and Loy Krathong are distinct festivals, the alignment of the Lanna and Thai lunar calendars means they are celebrated at the same time in northern Thailand. Yi Peng is a traditional Lanna festival centered on sky lanterns, with offerings of light directed upward toward the heavens and the Buddha's celestial stupa. In contrast, Loy Krathong is a national Thai festival involving the floating of small, decorated rafts (krathong) on rivers and waterways. Its focus is directed downward to the water, where participants pay respect to the water goddess Phra Mae Khongkha (identified with the Hindu goddess Ganga) and apologize for polluting the rivers.

In modern-day Chiang Mai, the two festivals have merged into a single, multi-day celebration. Both locals and visitors take part by releasing khom loi into the night sky and floating krathong on the Ping River.

== Celebrations ==
The Yi Peng festival is a three-day tradition that begins on the 13th day of the waxing moon, known locally as Wan Da. The first day is dedicated to shopping and preparing for the days of merit-making. The main religious activities take place on the 14th day of the waxing moon, the eve of the full moon. Monks and devotees gather at temples for religious observances, including chanting, meditation, and sermons. On this day, people also make large community krathongs at the temples, filling them with food to be given as alms to the poor. In the evening, many local communities hold smaller traditional ceremonies to release khom loi. The celebration culminates on the 15th day, the full moon, when the large krathongs from the temples, along with smaller personal ones, are taken to the river and floated.

Among the customs observed by the Lanna people during Yi Peng are lighting phang pratheep (small earthen lamps) and various kinds of lanterns as offerings to the Five Buddhas, flying kites, and lighting bok fai (traditional fireworks) at temples. These acts are performed in veneration of the five Buddhas of the present fortunate aeon (Bhadrakalpa): Kakusandha, Koṇāgamana, Kassapa, Siddhartha Gautama, and Maitreya. During the ritual, worshippers also recite traditional verses and make personal wishes for prosperity and protection, chanting, "May I be as bright as fire, may I be as clear as water. May all misfortunes, all dangers, all evils, and all calamities be destroyed." (Pali: Kho huue chaeng dang fai, kho huue sai dang nam. Sappa khroh, sappa phai, sappa saniat chanrai, vināsassantu).

During the Yi Peng festival, temples such as Wat Chedi Luang and Wat Phan Tao are adorned with thousands of colorful khom fai (hanging lanterns) and phang pratheep (small clay lamps). The hanging lanterns traditionally appear in five colors: blue, red, yellow, white, and orange, representing the Chapphannarangsi (the six-colored aura of the Buddha). According to legend, lanterns in these five colors were believed to protect an area from spirits and demons. When the spirits saw the lights, they thought the Buddha was present and fled in fear. Because of this belief, early hanging lanterns were made only in these five sacred colors. In later times, as the custom developed, lanterns began to be produced in a wider range of colors, which today serve mainly as festive decorations and as offerings in worship of the Buddha.

The festival is held not only in Chiang Mai but also in other northern provinces, including Lamphun, Lampang, and Chiang Rai. The Chiang Mai Municipality organizes a grand parade featuring illuminated floats, traditional Lanna music and dance performances, and depictions of Buddhist stories. In modern times, Yi Peng has become a major cultural and tourist event, attracting thousands of international visitors each year. Large-scale lantern release events are held at various locations, including Doi Saket, and Mae On district.

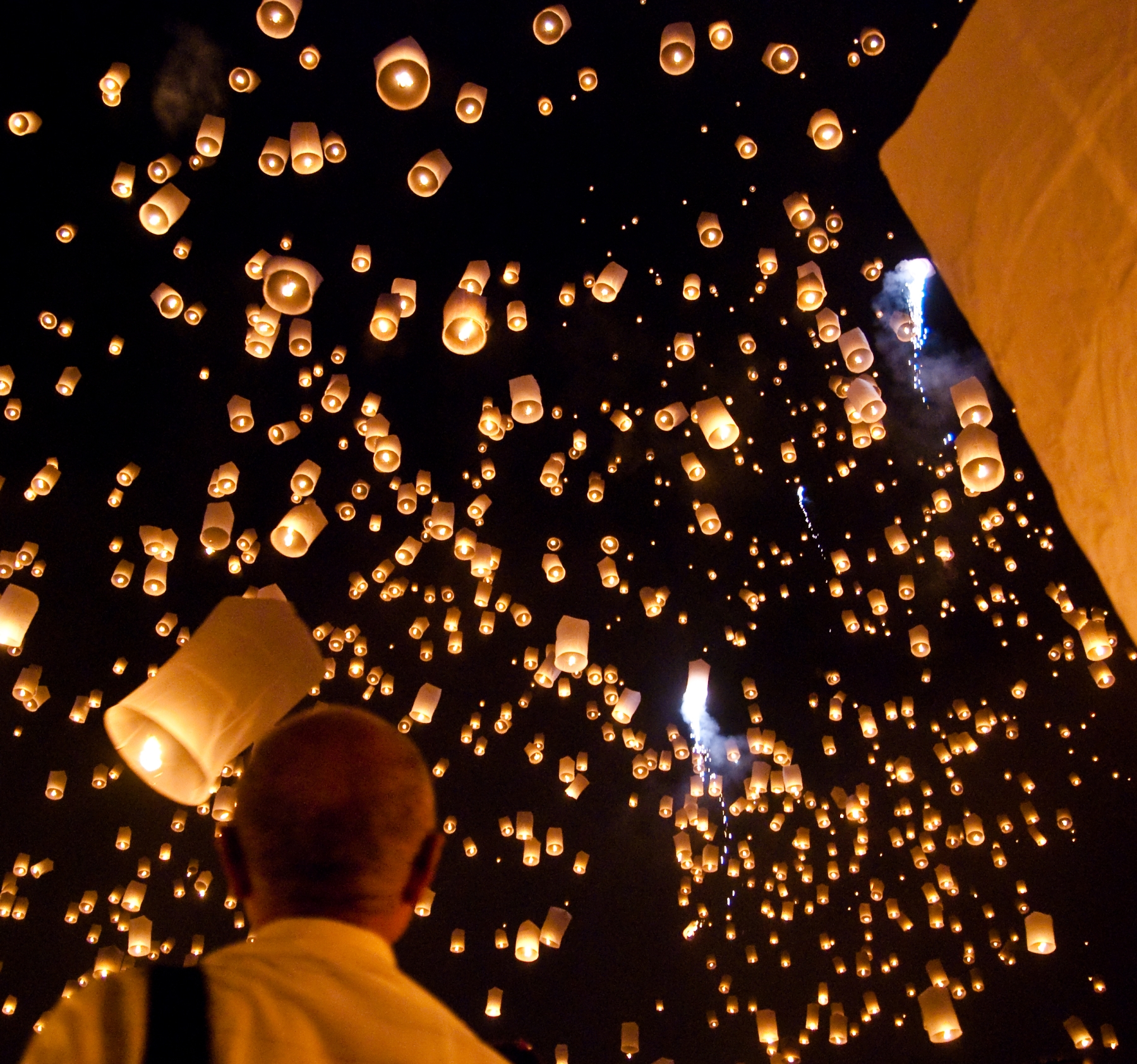
Thousands of khom loi in Mae Jo, Chiang Mai

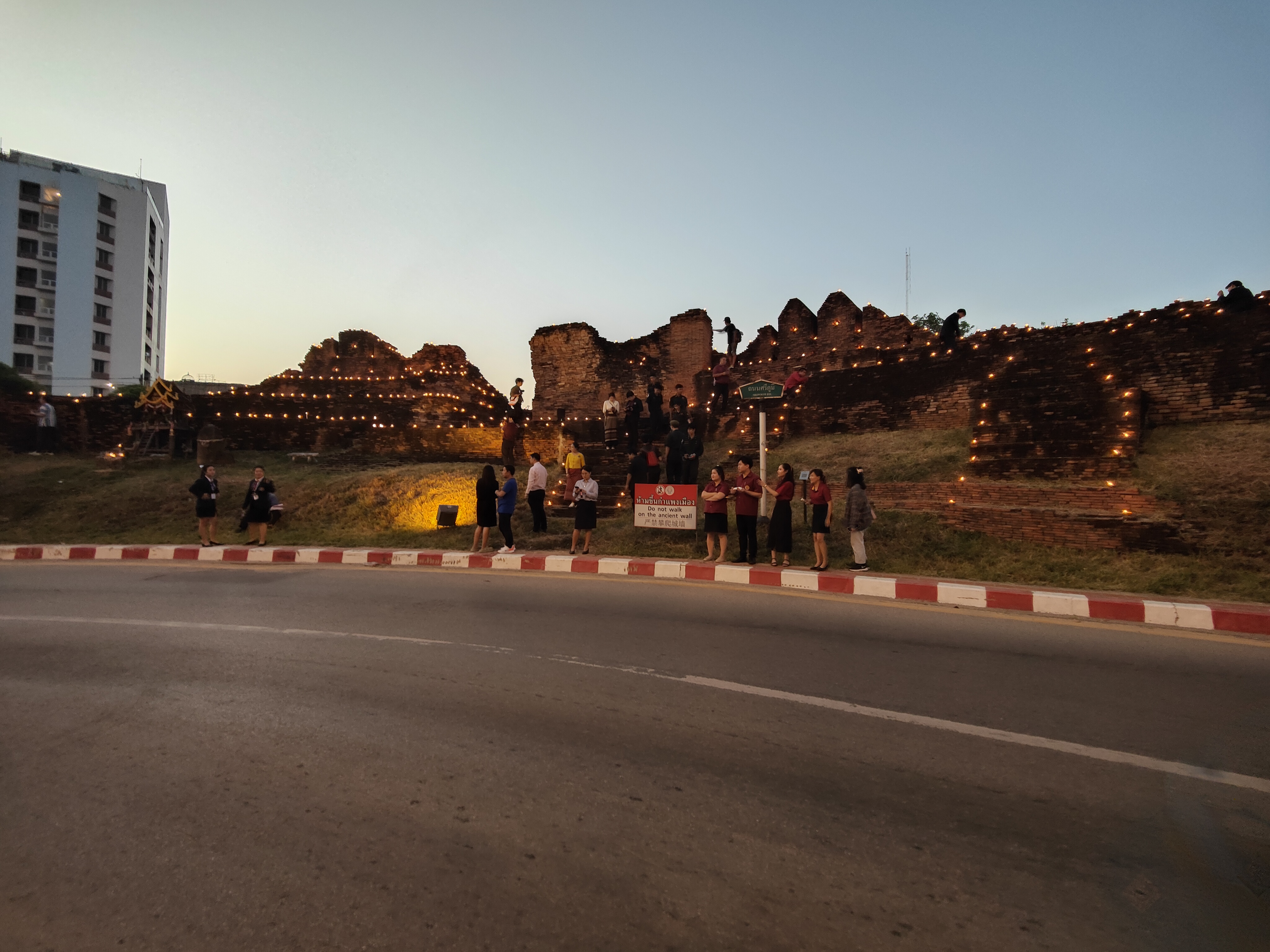
On the eve of the first Yo Peng day, thousands of candles at the old city walls

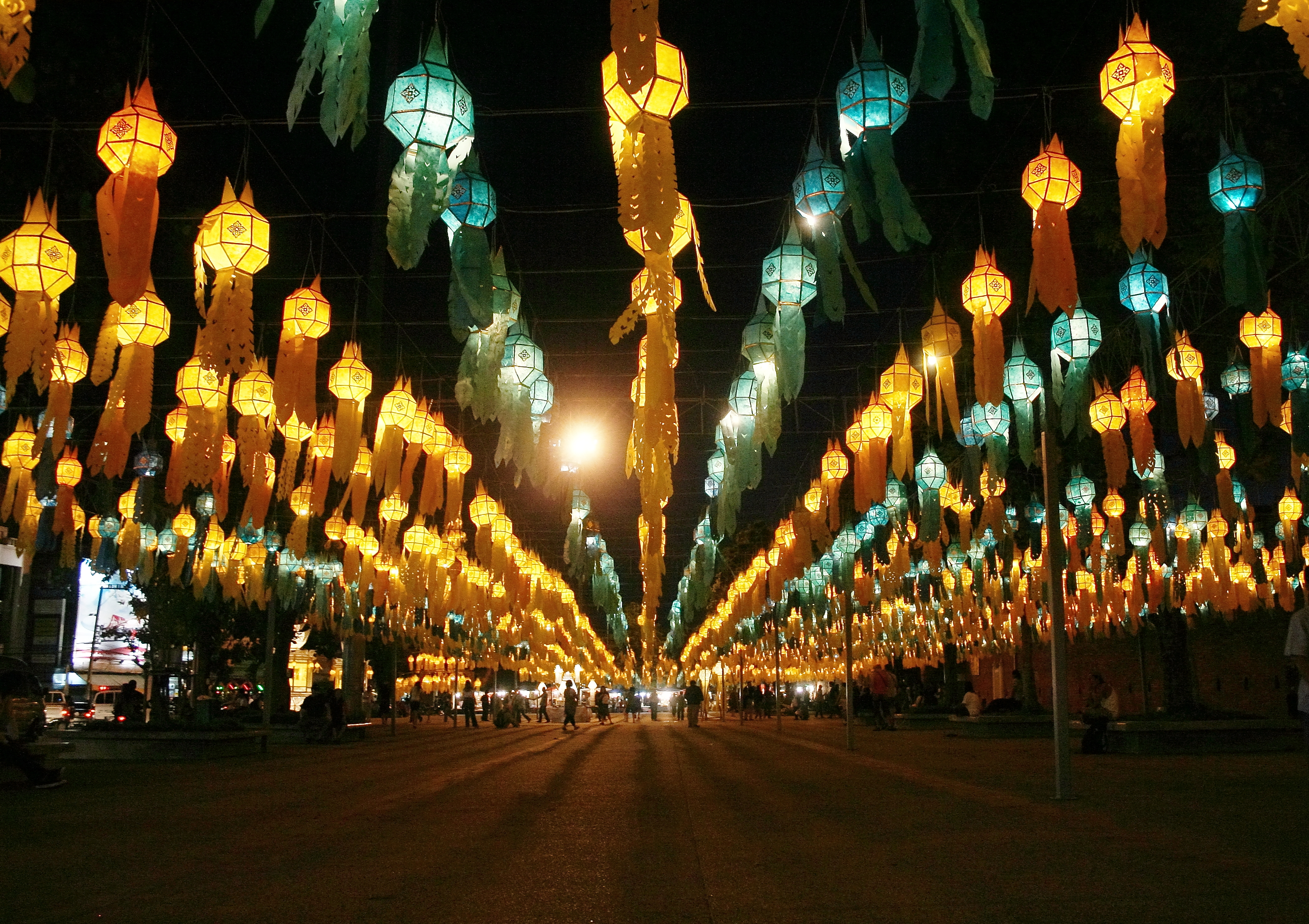
Hanging lanterns (khom khwaen) at Tha Phae Gate, Chiang Mai

=== Tang Tham Luang ===
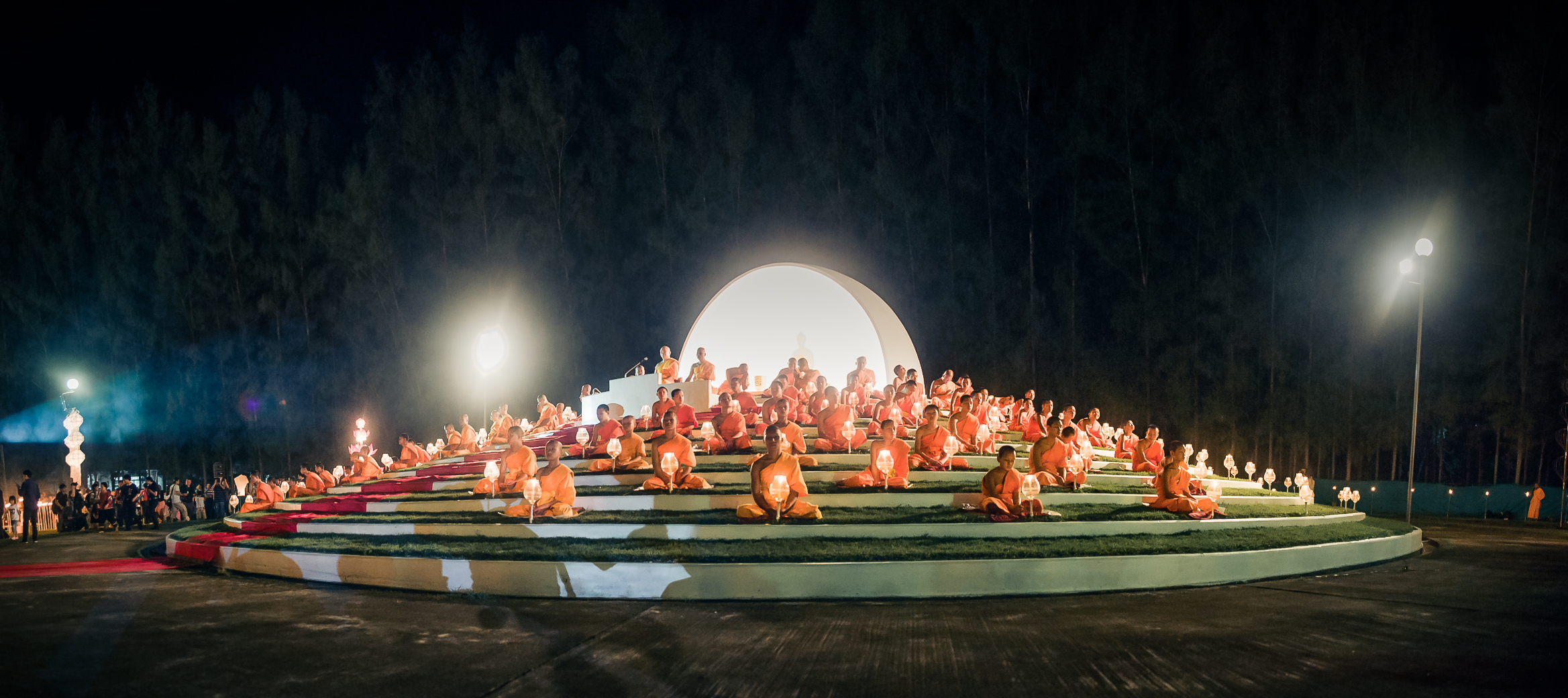
Buddhist monks reciting a sermon at the event

People also visit monasteries to make merit, attend the recitation of the Tang Tham Luang (Thai: ตั้งธัมม์หลวง) or Thet Mahachat (Thai: เทศน์มหาชาติ; the "Great Sermon" recounting the Vessantara Jātaka), which was the heart of the Yi Peng festival in the past. The sermon was divided into several days: on the first day, monks preached the Tham Wat sermons; on the second day, the Katha Phan (the “Thousand Verses”). Before beginning the Maha Chat Sermon, various other sermons would be delivered. On the final day, the preaching included the Malai Ton, Malai Plai, and Anisong Maha Chat scriptures.

At dawn the next morning, the recitation of the Maha Chat would begin with the Thotsaphon Khandha (The Ten Boons Chapter) and continue through all thirteen chapters of the Vessantara Jātaka, usually finishing in the evening around seven o’clock. Afterwards, there would be additional recitations such as the Buddhabhiseka Pathamasambodhi sermon, the Chet Tamnan Yot, the Dhammacakkappavattana Sutta, and the Buddhabhiseka blessing chant. Today, the entire Maha Chat sermon is often completed within a single day.

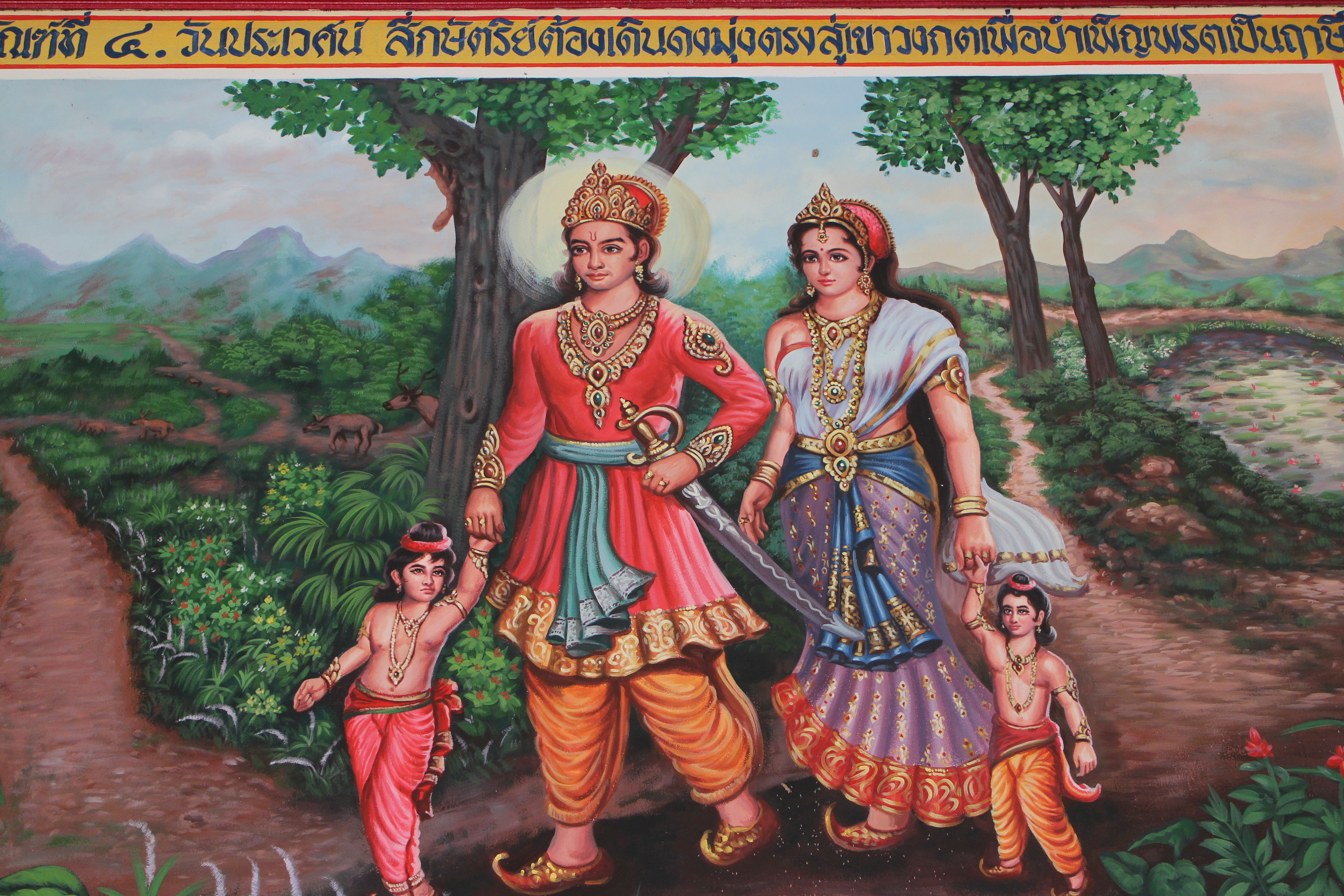
A mural depicting Prince Vessantara going into exile into the Himavanta forest.

Before organizing the Tang Tham Luang, both monks and laypeople worked together extensively, often beginning preparations at least a month in advance, as there were many tasks to complete. One of the most important duties was called tok tham, the act of inviting monks with eloquent voices to deliver sermons. Other preparations included decorating the venue, constructing royal-style fences and sum pratu pa (Thai: ซุ้มประตูป่า; forest archways), and adorning the archways with coconut fronds, parasols, flags, elephant and floral ornaments. Banana trees, sugarcane, galangal, and kuk plants were placed around the entrance to create the appearance of a gate leading into the forest. It is believed that this forest gate was inspired by the Vessantara Jataka, in which Prince Vessantara, after being exiled from the city together with his wife and children, entered the Himavanta forest to live as hermits and cultivate perfections. Upon reaching the forest gate, guarded by the hunter Jetabut, he was shown the path to the hermitage within the labyrinth (khao wongkot). Some temples recreated this scene by building a mock labyrinth within the temple grounds. At its center stood a shrine enshrining a Buddha image, and visitors who became “lost” would wander until they reached the center to pay homage. This experience brought joy and spiritual engagement to those who came to make merit.

The vihara was the preferred location for the Tang Tham Luang preaching. Inside, the hall would be decorated with offerings representing the Vessantara Jataka, including lotus flowers, dok phan (water lilies), triangular floral ornaments, and kradat tong (cut paper patterns) shaped like elephants, horses, oxen, buffaloes, male and female servants, jewels, rings, silver, and gold, each crafted in sets of one hundred. Hanging lanterns known as khom phat depicted scenes from the Vessantara Jataka. These lanterns were suspended from a frame and attached to pulleys, allowing them to be raised and lowered for lighting; hence they were called khom lo (“wheel lanterns”), with lo referring to the pulley mechanism used for hoisting the lights.

=== Lanna Yi Peng Lantern Contest ===
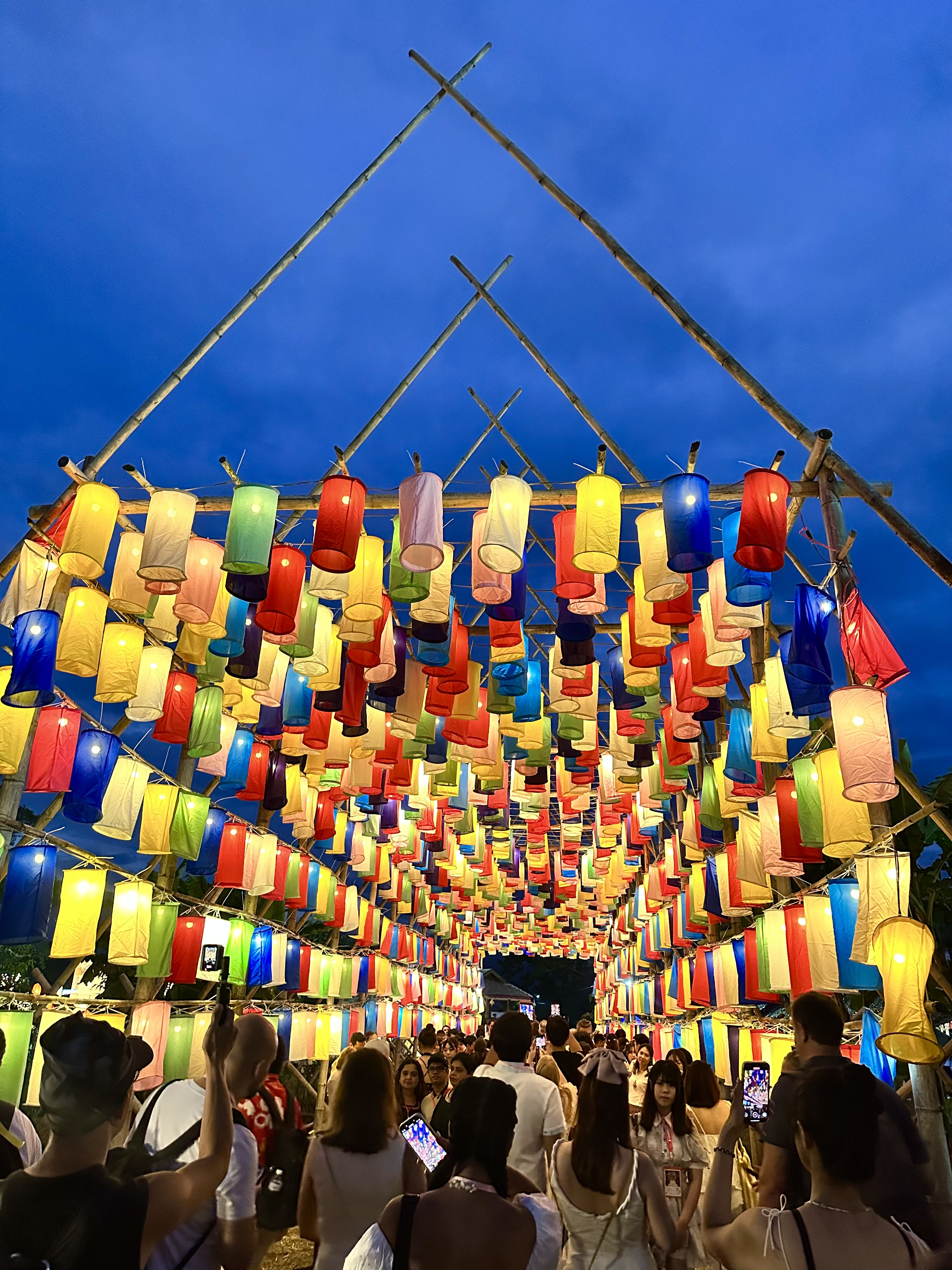
Hanging lanterns (khom khwaen).

The Tha Phae Gate area hosts the annual Lanna Yi Peng Lantern Contest (ประกวดโคมยี่เป็งล้านนา), which aims to preserve traditional craftsmanship and promote the artistic and cultural heritage of the Lanna people. The event also demonstrates the spirit of community cooperation and enduring devotion to this long-established tradition. Each year, more than ten lanterns are submitted by government agencies, private organizations, educational institutions, and community groups. The lanterns are made from natural materials such as bamboo and sa paper (กระดาษสา) and are intricately decorated with Lanna-style patterns. Entries are judged based on beauty, creativity, adherence to Lanna artistic traditions, and structural durability.

=== Miss Yi Peng Chiang Mai ===
The Miss Yi Peng Chiang Mai (เทพียี่เป็งเชียงใหม่) beauty pageant has been held annually at the Tha Phae Gate since 2023. The event is organized by the Chiang Mai Municipality as part of the annual Yi Peng celebrations to preserve and promote Lanna cultural heritage. The winner serves as a cultural ambassador to represent Chiang Mai and support local tourism promotion efforts.

=== Grand Krathong Parade ===
On the final night of the Yi Peng Festival, Chiang Mai hosts the Grand Krathong Parade (ขบวนแห่กระทงใหญ่), an annual procession that competes for the royal trophy bestowed by the King of Thailand. The parade begins at Tha Phae Road and continues to the Ping River, concluding in front of the Chiang Mai City Municipality Office. Each year, the event attracts tens of thousands of Thai and international visitors who gather to watch the illuminated floats, traditional music, and cultural performances that form part of the celebration.

=== CAD Khomloy Sky Lantern Festival ===
Releasing sky lanterns at the CAD Khomloy Sky Lantern Festival, Mae On.

The Chiang Mai CAD Khomloy Sky Lantern Festival (เทศกาลโคมลอย เชียงใหม่ CAD) is a privately organized event distinct from the traditional temple-based Yi Peng celebrations. It is hosted by Chiang Mai Arts & Design at the CAD Cultural Center Lanna in Mae On district, outside the Chiang Mai city area.

The event is regarded as one of the most popular mass sky-lantern releases, and is considered the city's largest ticketed event. Aimed primarily at tourists, it features a choreographed, simultaneous release of thousands of sky lanterns, accompanied by fireworks, a dinner buffet, and traditional Lanna cultural performances. Attendance requires pre-purchased tickets, which are typically sold months in advance and offered in tiered pricing categories.

According to the organizer from Chiangmai CAD, the two-day event attracts between 30,000 and 40,000 international tourists from 110 countries. He estimates that this influx generates about 4 billion THB in revenue, which is distributed among airlines, hotels (occupying around 20,000 rooms), restaurants, tour guides, and transport services. The event is described as eco-friendly, with lanterns designed to fly for approximately eight minutes and land within a 4–5 kilometre radius. It is held in a zone approved by the airport and district authorities, away from residential areas, to prevent fire hazards. After the release, a team is hired to collect fallen lanterns and a buy-back programme pays local villagers in six sub-districts 3 THB per lantern collected, providing a source of income for the community.

Video clips from the Chiangmai CAD Lantern Festival circulated widely on social media, captivating viewers with their vivid imagery. Some users speculated that the footage had been created using artificial intelligence. However, Thai PBS and several AI experts later confirmed that the videos were genuine and not AI-generated.

== Regulations ==
The growing popularity of sky lantern (khom loi) releases during the Yi Peng Festival has led to increasing environmental and public safety concerns. To address these issues, local authorities have introduced strict regulations governing the mass release of lanterns. The rules require the use of biodegradable materials and restrict launches to designated open areas to prevent fire hazards and interference with air traffic.

The main concern is aviation safety, as thousands of uncontrolled lanterns pose a danger to aircraft. The Chiang Mai International Airport has historically cancelled or rescheduled numerous flights during the festival period to avoid potential accidents.

Lanterns, which function as small hot-air balloons with open flames, can fall on houses, power lines or dry fields, and cause fires. Once extinguished, their frames often made of wire or bamboo, return to the ground, creating waste and posing risks to farmland and wildlife. In response, Chiang Mai’s local government has implemented comprehensive safety measures. The release of sky lanterns is banned within the city's municipal boundaries except in pre-approved areas and within limited time windows on the festival nights. Large commercial events are held outside the city at authorized venues.

A 2020 provincial decree stipulated that lanterns may be released only on two specific days between 7 p.m. and 1 a.m., using natural, size-limited materials and only in designated zones.

In October 2025, the provincial government announced that six districts (covering 39 subdistricts) would be designated "Special Surveillance Level 1" (Red Zones), where all lantern and balloon releases are prohibited. Violations are punishable by up to five years' imprisonment and fines of 200,000 baht.

== Economic impact ==
The Yi Peng Festival is a major driver for Chiang Mai's local economy. During the 2025 festival, which ran from October 31 to November 8, the event generated an estimated 2.76 billion baht in revenue. It attracted over 184,800 visitors, pushing local hotel occupancy rates to approximately 90 percent and exceeding the tourism metrics of the previous year.
