= Cūḷāmaṇi Cetiya =

Celestial stupa in Buddhist cosmology

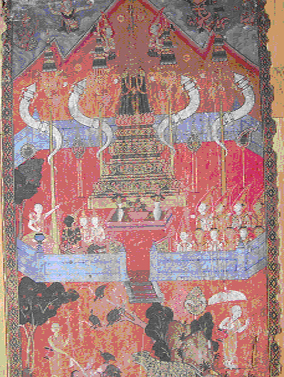
Rattanakosin-style painting of Phra Malai visiting the Tavatimsa Heaven to pay homage to the Cūḷāmaṇi Cetiya

Cūḷāmaṇi Cetiya is a celestial stupa in the Trāyastriṃśa heaven, mentioned in Buddhist cosmology, that holds sacred relics of the Buddha. According to tradition, it contains the hair that Prince Siddhattha cut off when he became an ascetic, which was later enshrined by the god Śakra (Indra). After the Buddha's death, Śakra also added one of his collarbones to the stupa. The name itself translates to "Crest-jewel Stupa".

It is one of the most revered shrines in the Buddhist cosmos, serving as the central object of worship for the devas (deities) of Tāvatiṃsa.

== Description ==
In Theravāda cosmology, Cūḷāmaṇi Cetiya is not a small shrine but an immense celestial monument. The text describes it as one yojana high (a yojana being a "league" roughly 16 km or 10 miles) and made of the seven kinds of precious gems.

== Legends ==
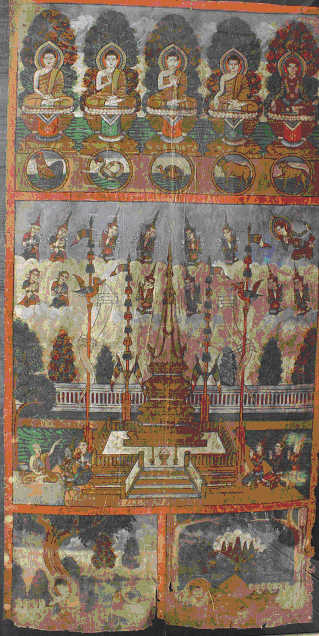
Cūḷāmaṇi Cetiya depicted in a Cambodian painting

According to the Buddhist legend, Prince Siddhartha left his palace and crossed the Anoma River to give up his royal life and pursue enlightenment. He took off his royal regalia on the riverbank and chopped off his long hair (the cūḷā or topknot) with his sword. After he made up his mind, he threw the hair into the air and declared, "Let this hair stay in the sky if I am to become a Buddha." If not, let it drop to the floor. The hair bundle, which was reportedly two inches long, rose one yojana—roughly seven to ten miles—into the air before coming to a stop. Śakra, the deva king, witnessed the event from Tāvatiṃsa heaven at that precise moment. Bringing a golden coffin, he respectfully gathered the hair relic and carried it to Tāvatiṃsa. He enshrined it there in the Cūḷāmaṇi Cetiya.

During the distribution of the Buddha's bodily relics, a Brahmin named Dona was tasked with dividing them among the various kings and rulers. As Dona was performing the division, he secretly concealed the Buddha's right canine tooth (or right eye-tooth) in his turban. Śakra observed this act and, reflecting that Dona was not worthy of possessing such a profound relic, used his divine power to stealthily remove the tooth from Dona's turban. He took the tooth relic back to Tāvatiṃsa heaven and enshrined it alongside the hair relic within the Cūḷāmaṇi Cetiya. Another tooth relic, the left canine, was later enshrined in Kandy, Sri Lanka, and is known as the Sri Dalada Maligawa (Temple of the Tooth).

According to the Southeast Asian Phra Malai story, the arahant Phra Malai ascends to Tāvatiṃsa Heaven and pays homage to the Buddha's relics at Cūḷāmaṇi Cetiya. While there, he receives prophecies about the future Buddha, Maitreya, and delivers messages from beings in the lower realms who ask for merit (puñña) to be dedicated to them.

In the Sri Lankan Anāgatavaṃsa (Chronicle of the Future), Metteyya visits Tāvatiṃsa to pay homage to the Buddha's relics at Cūḷāmaṇi Cetiya before his final rebirth on earth. According to traditional belief, celestial beings assemble at the Cūḷāmaṇi Cetiya on Buddhist holy days, circling the shrine with lit candles in homage to the Buddha and his teachings.

According to the Mahāvaṃsa, the Buddha's right collarbone was once kept in the Cūḷāmaṇi Cetiya before it was brought to earth. The monk Sumana Sāmaṇera travelled to Tāvatiṃsa, where Śakra gave him the relic stored in the Cūḷāmaṇi Cetiya so that it could be taken back to earth and enshrined at the Thūpārāma, the earliest great stupa in Sri Lanka.

The celestial Cūḷāmaṇi Cetiya has inspired "earthly" counterparts in several Buddhist countries, where temples or monuments are named in its honor. One example is Wat Chulamani in Phitsanulok, Thailand, regarded as one of the oldest temples in the region and believed to predate the Ayutthaya period. Historical chronicles recount that King Borommatrailokkanat (Boromma Trailokkanat) moved his capital to Phitsanulok in the 15th century and later entered the monkhood at this temple. Local tradition holds that the temple's name honors the heavenly cetiya, and some accounts even link the king's own ordination and hair-cutting ceremony with this site.

== In culture ==
The Cūḷāmaṇi Cetiya is the sacred stupa designated for those born in the Year of the Dog (ปีจอ). This belief is part of a Northern Thai tradition called "Phra That Pracham Pi Koet" (พระธาตุประจำปีเกิด), which means "Sacred Stupa for one's Birth Year.

During the Yi Peng festival in Northern Thailand, people release khom loi (sky lanterns) as an offering to the Cūḷāmaṇi Cetiya.
