= Wat Chulamani =

Coordinates: 16.7878°N 100.2168°E

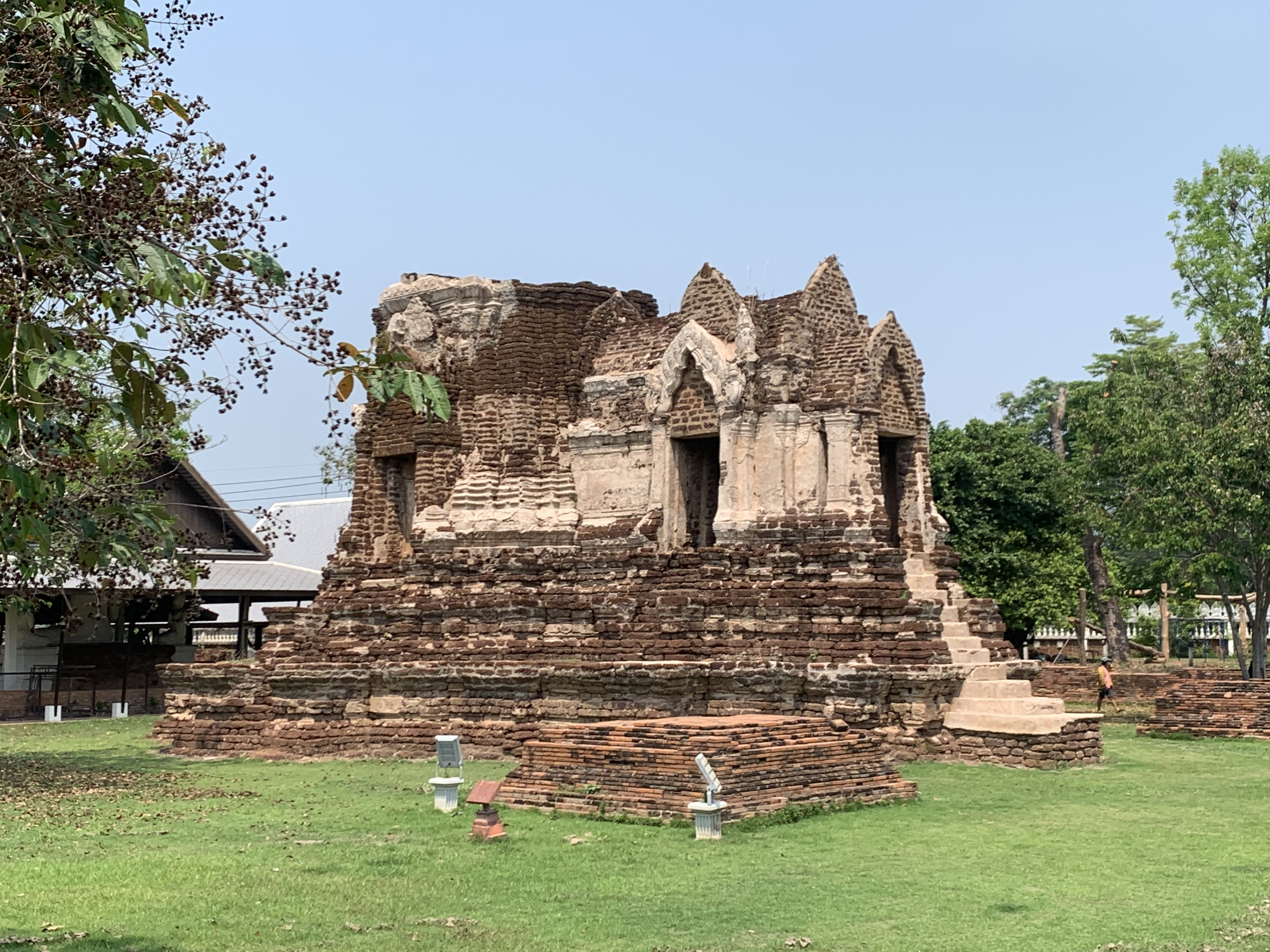
Wat Chulamani, Phitsanulok

Wat Chulamani (Thai: วัดจุฬามณี) is a Buddhist temple in Wat Chulamani Village, Tha Thong Subdistrict, Mueang Phitsanulok District, Phitsanulok Province, Thailand.

== Geography ==
Wat Chulamani is located on the east bank of the Nan River.

== History ==
Wat Chulamani is the oldest standing temple in Phitsanulok Province. It was built in the Sukhothai era. Historical chronicles recount that King Borommatrailokkanat (Boromma Trailokkanat) moved his capital to Phitsanulok in the 15th century and later entered the monkhood at this temple. Local tradition holds that the temple's name honors the heavenly stupa called Cūḷāmaṇi Cetiya, and some accounts even associate the king's own ordination and hair-cutting ceremony with this site.

== Features ==
The temple is famous for its elaborate Khmer style pagoda.
