= Pracha Prasobdee =

Thai politician

Pracha Prasobdee MPCh MWM MP
- ประชา ประสพดี

Deputy Minister of the Interior
- In office 28 October 2012 – 22 May 2014
- Prime Minister: Yingluck Shinawatra
- Preceded by: Tanis Thienthong; Chuchart Harnsawat
- Succeeded by: Sutee Makboon

Member of the Thai House of Representatives
- In office 3 July 2011 – 7 May 2014
- Constituency: Samut Prakan 7th district

Personal details
- Born: 31 October 1960 (age 65) Bangkok, Thailand
- Party: Pheu Thai Party
- Spouse: Nuntawan Prasopdee
- Education: Siam University; Dhurakij Pundit University; Chulalongkorn University; Ubon Ratchathani University(Ph.D.)
- Profession: Politician; lawyer

Pracha Prasobdee (Thai: ประชา ประสพดี) is a Thai politician. As of 2012, he was a Deputy Minister of the Interior and a member of the House of Representatives of the Pheu Thai Party.

== Life ==
Pracha was born on 31 October 1960, the son of Pranom and Somsamai Prasobdee, with 3 siblings. He obtained a bachelor's degree in law from Siam University, and a master's degree in public law from Dhurakij Pundit University and education administration from Chulalongkorn University. He graduated with a doctoral degree in public administration from Ubon Ratchathani University.

He is married to Nuntawan Prasobdee and has one child. His younger sister, Naruemon Tharndamrong (Thai: นฤมล ธารดำรงค์), was named one of 26 red-shirt political officers while serving as advisor to the Labor Minister.

== Politics ==
Pracha was an unsuccessful candidate for the Palang Dharma Party several times. He was elected as an MP for the first time in 2001 for the Thai Rak Thai Party. He was shot and injured by a hitman in May 2011, before the 2011 general election, but won the election. In 2012, he was appointed as deputy interior minister in Yingluck cabinet.

== Awards from the king of Thailand ==
- Knight Commander (Second Class) Order of the White Elephant
- Knight Grand Cross (First Class) Order of the Crown of Thailand
- Knight Grand Cross (First Class) Order of the White Elephant
- Knight Grand Cordon (Special Class) Order of the Crown of Thailand
- Knight Grand Cordon (Special Class)Order of the White Elephant
