= Khon Kaen Hospital =

Khon Kaen Hospital โรงพยาบาลขอนแก่น
- The Ministry of Public Health Health District 7

Geography
- Location: 54 Sri Chant Road, Nai Mueang Subdistrict, Mueang Khon Kaen District, Khon Kaen 40000, Thailand
- Coordinates: 16.429202°N 102.849125°E

Organisation
- Type: Regional
- Affiliated university: Faculty of Medicine, Khon Kaen University

Services
- Beds: 1100

History
- Opened: 1 January 1951

Links
- Website: www.kkh.go.th
- Lists: Hospitals in Thailand

Khon Kaen Hospital (Thai: โรงพยาบาลขอนแก่น) is the main hospital of Khon Kaen Province, Thailand and is classified under the Ministry of Public Health as a regional hospital. It has a CPIRD Medical Education Center which trains doctors for the Faculty of Medicine of Khon Kaen University.

== History ==
Khon Kaen Hospital was constructed in 1947 and was opened on 1 January 1951, as 3 one-storey wooden buildings. Between 1957 and 1967, the hospital was further expanded due to high popularity within the area. The hospital was involved in sending medical personnel to the Princess Mother's Volunteer Doctors and psychologists to combat the Communist Insurgency in the 1960s-80s. In the same time, the Japan International Cooperation Agency (JICA) funded an ambulance service for the hospital and helped set up the first trauma registry of the Ministry of Public Health at Khon Kaen.

== See also ==
- Healthcare in Thailand
- Hospitals in Thailand
- List of hospitals in Thailand
