= Srinagarind Hospital =

Coordinates: 16.468089°N 102.830054°E

Srinagarind Hospital โรงพยาบาลศรีนครินทร์
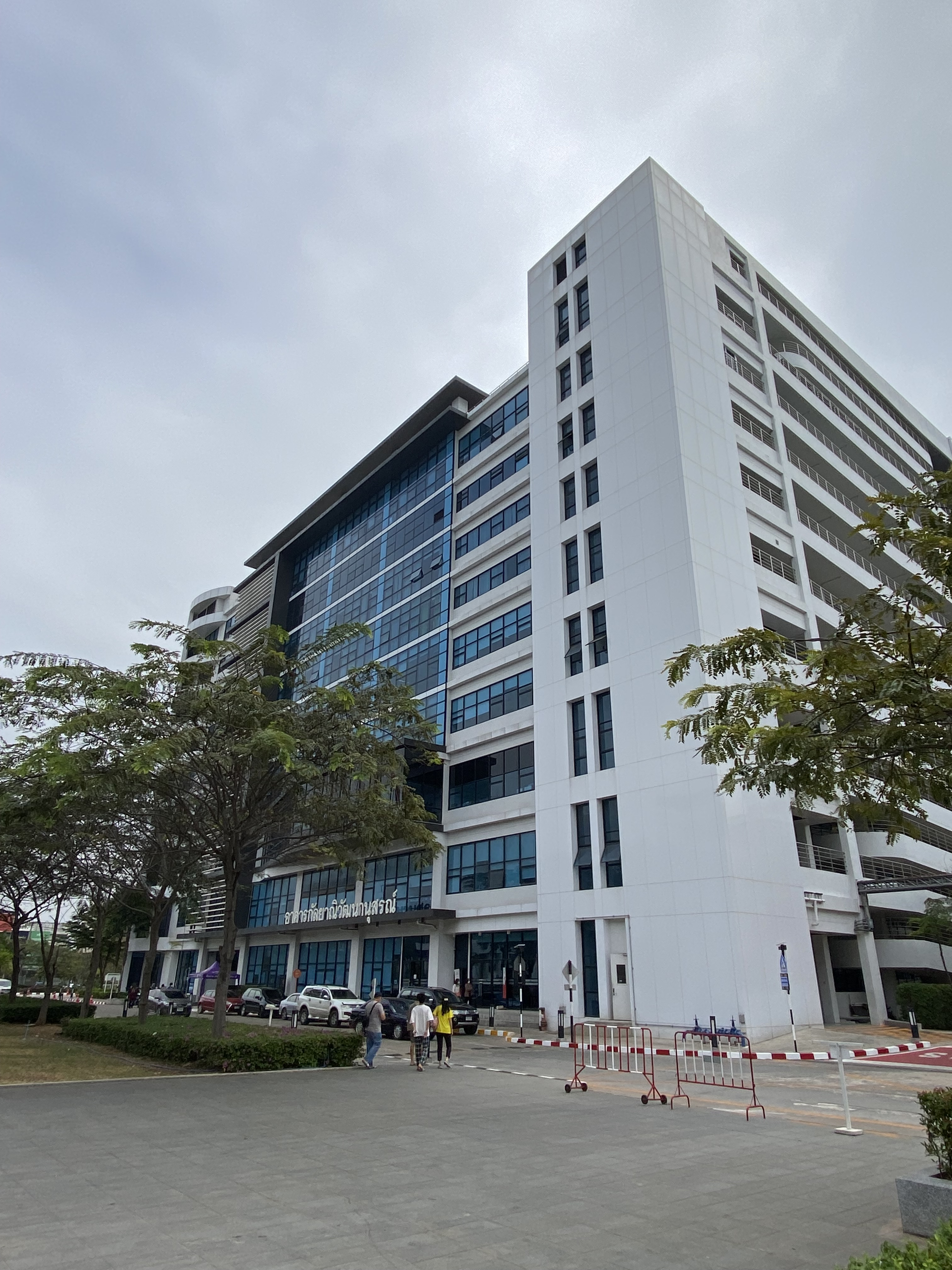

Geography
- Location: 123 Mittraphap Road, Nai Mueang Subdistrict Mueang Khon Kaen District, Khon Kaen 40002, Thailand, Thailand

Organisation
- Type: Teaching
- Affiliated university: Faculty of Medicine, Khon Kaen University

Services
- Beds: 1466

History
- Opened: 23 June 1975

Links
- Website: srinagarind.md.kku.ac.th
- Lists: Hospitals in Thailand

Srinagarind Hospital (Thai: โรงพยาบาลศรีนครินทร์) is a university teaching hospital, affiliated to the Faculty of Medicine of Khon Kaen University, located in Mueang Khon Kaen District, Khon Kaen Province. It is a hospital capable of super tertiary care.

== History ==
On 23 June 1975, Khon Kaen University opened a small temporary building as a hospital for teaching and treatment of patients, named 'Hut Hospital'. The hospital then received aid in its development in an agreement between the government of Thailand and the government of New Zealand. King Bhumibol Adulyadej laid the foundation stone for the new hospital on 19 February 1976 and named it 'Srinagarind Hospital' in honour of Princess Srinagarindra. The hospital opened on 15 December 1983. Srinagarind Hospital was expanded and built the 'Marking Princess Srinagarindra 89th Birthday' Building (Akhan 89 Phansa Somdet Ya), increasing the number of operating theatres by 9. This was opened on 24 January 1995, by King Vajiralongkorn (then Crown Prince).

As a university hospital, it is generally regarded as one of the final referral centers for complicated and rare diseases from all hospitals, especially within Northeastern Thailand.

== See also ==
- Healthcare in Thailand
- Hospitals in Thailand
- List of hospitals in Thailand
