= Faculty of Medicine, Khon Kaen University =

Thai medical school

- คณะแพทยศาสตร์ มหาวิทยาลัยขอนแก่น
- Type: Public (non-profit)
- Established: 9 September 1972
- Parent institution: Khon Kaen University
- Dean: Assoc. Prof. Apichat Jiravuttipong, M.D.
- Location: 123 Mittraphap Road, Nai Mueang Subdistrict, Mueang Khon Kaen, Khon Kaen 40002, Thailand
- Colors: Green
- Website: www.md.kku.ac.th

The Faculty of Medicine, Khon Kaen University (Thai: คณะแพทยศาสตร์ มหาวิทยาลัยขอนแก่น) is the fifth oldest medical school in Thailand located in Mueang Khon Kaen District, Khon Kaen Province, the second medical school to be set up in a region outside Bangkok and is the sixth oldest faculty of Khon Kaen University.

== History ==
The construction of the Faculty of Medicine was proposed in 1968 by Prof. Bimala Kalakicha to the council of Khon Kaen University. The proposal was passed on to the governmental cabinet and eventually made it into the 'Third National Economic and Social Development Plan' of 1972-1976. Construction received cabinet approval on 4 August 1972 and the faculty opened on 9 September 1972.The first cohort of medical students were admitted in 1974, selected from students in the Faculties of Science and Arts and consisted of 16 students. In 1973, a proposal was made to the cabinet requesting for assistance from the government of New Zealand in the construction of the university hospital.

The construction of the university hospital was initiated in 1973, designed by the British company Llewelyn-Davies Weeks Forester-Walkers and Bor. and construction by the New Zealand company Kingston Reynolds Thom & Allardice Limited (KRTA). On 19 February 1974, King Bhumibol Adulyadej, Queen Sirikit, Princess Sirindhorn and Princess Chulabhorn Walailak laid the foundation for the hospital and the hospital was named Srinagarind Hospital in commemoration of Princess Srinagarindra.The hospital was opened on 15 December 1983.

== Departments ==
- Department of Anesthesiology
- Department of Anatomy
- Department of Community Medicine
- Department of Forensic Medicine
- Department of Internal Medicine
- Department of Microbiology
- Department of Obstetrics and Gynaecology
- Department of Ophthalmology
- Department of Orthopaedics
- Department of Otolaryngology
- Department of Parasitology
- Department of Pathology
- Department of Paediatrics
- Department of Pharmacology
- Department of Physical Therapy
- Department of Physiology
- Department of Preclinical and Clinical Science
- Department of Psychology
- Department of Radiology
- Department of Rehabilitation Medicine
- Department of Surgery

== Main Teaching Hospitals ==
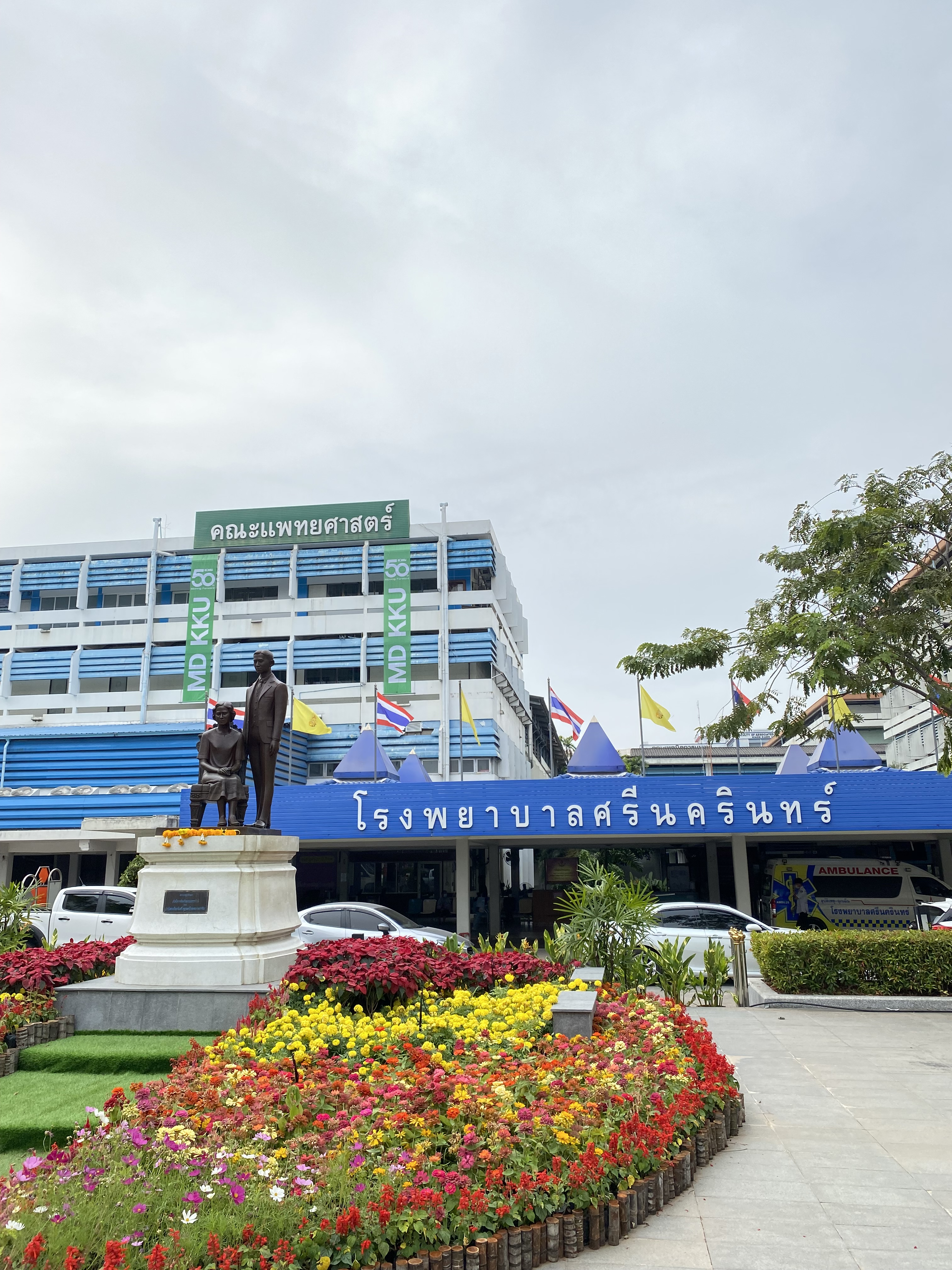
Srinagarind Hospital

- Srinagarind Hospital, Khon Kaen Province
- Khon Kaen Hospital (CPIRD), Khon Kaen Province
- Sunpasitthiprasong Hospital (CPIRD), Ubon Ratchathani Province
- Maha Sarakham Hospital (CPIRD), Maha Sarakham Province
- Udon Thani Hospital (CPIRD), Udon Thani Province

== Affiliated Teaching Hospitals ==
- Nong Khai Hospital, Nong Khai Province
- Chaiyaphum Hospital, Chaiyaphum Province
- Kalasin Hospital, Kalasin Province

== See also ==
- List of medical schools in Thailand
