= Tha Phae Gate =

Historic city gate in Chiang Mai, Thailand

Coordinates: 18°47′16″N 98°59′36″E

- ᨸᨲᩪᨴ᩵ᩣᩯᨻ (Northern Thai); ประตุท่าแพ (Thai)
- Chiang Rueak Gate
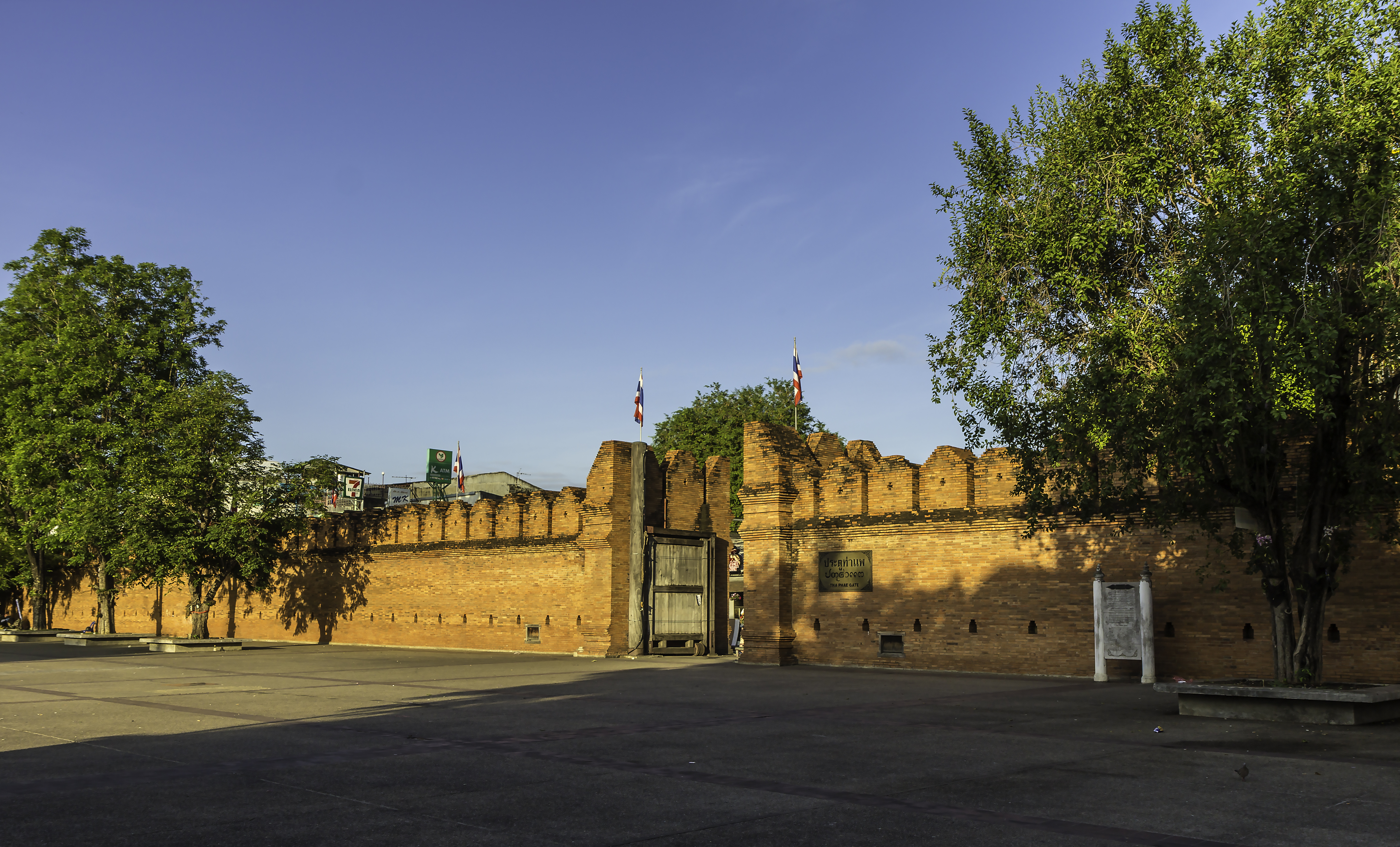
- Tha Phae Gate
- Interactive map of Tha Phae Gate
- Type: City gate
- Location: Chang Khlan, Mueang Chiang Mai district, Chiang Mai province, Thailand

History
- Built: 1296
- Built by: King Mangrai
- Demolished: 1948
- Rebuilt: 1986

Site notes
- Architectural style: Lanna
- Current use: Reconstructed replacement of the original gate
- Governing body: Chiang Mai Municipality

Tha Phae Gate (Northern Thai: ᨸᨲᩪᨴ᩵ᩣᩯᨻ; Thai: ประตูท่าแพ, Thai pronunciation: [prā.tūː tʰâː pʰɛ̄ː]) is the eastern and most famous gate of Chiang Mai, Thailand. It stands at the eastern side of the old walled city and today serves as a major landmark and public gathering place. The current structure is a reconstruction from 1985–1986, built on the site of the historic gate.

== History ==
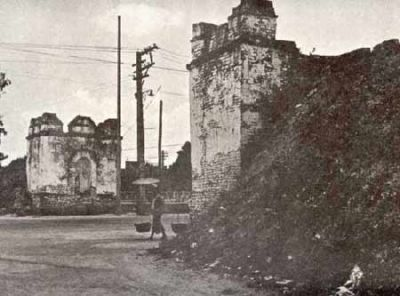
The old Tha Phae Gate and Tha Phae Road in 1949

Tha Phae Gate was originally constructed during the Lanna Kingdom period in the 13th century as part of the city's fortified walls and moat system surrounding the old town of Chiang Mai. It served as the eastern gateway of the inner city, historically known as Chiang Rueak Gate (Thai: ประตูเชียงเรือก; Northern Thai: ᨸᨲᩪᨩ᩠ᨿᨦᩁᩮᩨᩬᨠ) named after the nearby village of Chiang Rueak. It was first built during the reign of King Mangrai, the founder of Chiang Mai, in 1296. The area outside the gate was once a major commercial zone linked to trade routes and river transport along the Ping River.

The name Chiang Ruea Gate was later changed to Inner Tha Phae Gate to correspond with Outer Tha Phae Gate, which was located along the same road. The Outer Tha Phae Gate stood in the area of Wat Saen Fang before being demolished during urban development. The remaining Inner Tha Phae Gate has since been known simply as Tha Phae Gate. The original Tha Phae Gate (inner layer) was a double-layered gate with a staggered alignment. It featured a bastion that protruded beside the gate, serving as a fortress to defend the city during wartime in the past (as it appears in the map of Nakhon Chiang Mai from 1893, during the reign of King Inthawichayanon).

Since the construction of Chiang Mai's city walls and gates, they have undergone several periods of dismantling and reconstruction and no longer remain in their original form. The gate was renovated between 1966 and 1967, under the supervision and design of Thongyot Suwanprathet, the municipal engineer. The present structure of the Tha Phae Gate is a reconstruction undertaken by the Chiang Mai Municipality and the Fine Arts Department between 1985 and 1987. The restoration was based on historical records, archaeological evidence, and an old photograph of one of Chiang Mai’s city gates, believed to depict either the Outer Tha Phae Gate or, according to some sources, the Chiang Mai Gate. The restoration project aimed to preserve the traditional Lanna-style brickwork and the gate's original form. According to the book Chiang Mai City Wall, the Tha Phae Gate may have been reconstructed prior to its official restoration in 1985, without reliance on archaeological evidence.

On 2 November 2023, the Fine Arts Department Regional Office 7 in Chiang Mai announced the discovery of an ancient inscription known as the Tha Phae Gate Inscription hidden within the gate’s structure. The inscription had been missing or unobserved for nearly four decades after being removed during renovations of the gate around 1985–1987. It is written in Lanna script (Aksorn Tham style) and contains text reading, for example, อินทขีล มังค(ล) โสตถิ (Inthakhil Mang(k) Sotthi) among other lines.

== Architecture ==
The gate is built primarily of red brick and designed in the Lanna architectural style. It features a central wooden door flanked by fortified walls that extend toward the city’s corners. Tha Phae is the only gate of the old inner wall that still retains its complete wooden doors (bantabaan). The surrounding open square has become a popular spot for public activities and photography.

== Cultural significance ==
Tha Phae Gate is widely regarded as the heart of Chiang Mai. It often serves as the venue for major cultural and religious festivals, including

- The Yi Peng festival, during which thousands of lanterns are released into the sky.
- The Songkran (Thai New Year) celebrations, featuring parades, performances, and water festivities.
- The Chiang Mai Flower Festival, an annual celebration that showcases a variety of flowers and ornamental plants.
- The Sunday Walking Street Market (ถนนคนเดินท่าแพ), which starts at the gate and extends along Ratchadamnoen Road.

== Public demonstrations ==
On 19 July 2020, groups of Chiang Mai residents and university students gathered at Tha Phae Gate to demonstrate against Prime Minister Prayut Chan-o-cha and his government as part of the 2020–2021 Thai protests. The protesters demanded the prime minister's resignation and amendments to the constitution, echoing the same calls made by the Free Youth Movement (เยาวชนปลดแอก) and the Student Union of Thailand, who were rallying at the Democracy Monument in Bangkok on the same day.
