= Ubon Ratchathani University =

Public university

Ubon Ratchathani University (UBU)
- มหาวิทยาลัยอุบลราชธานี (ม.อบ.)
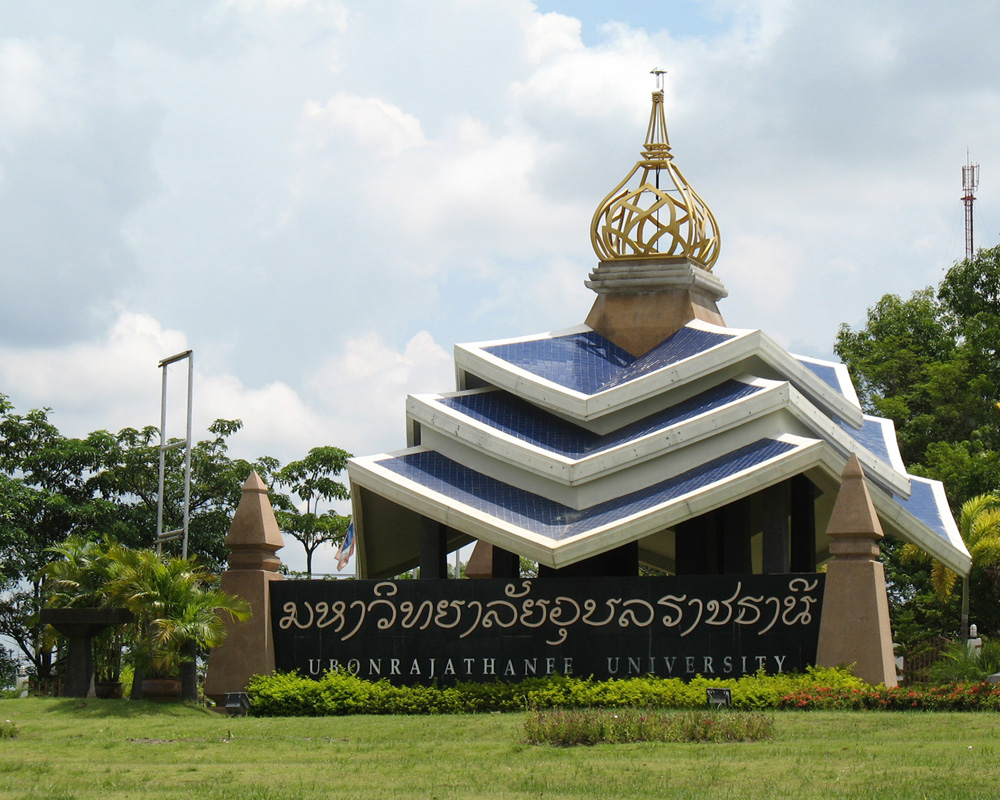
- Type: Autonomous public university
- Established: July 29, 1990
- President: Chutinun Prasitpuriprecha
- Royal conferrer: Maha Chakri Sirindhorn, Princess Royal of Thailand on behalf of the King
- Location: Ubon Ratchathani, Thailand; 15°7′4.95″N 104°54′4.95″E
- Campus: Urban, 8 square kilometres (2,000 acres)
- Colours: Blue and yellow
- Website: www.ubu.ac.th

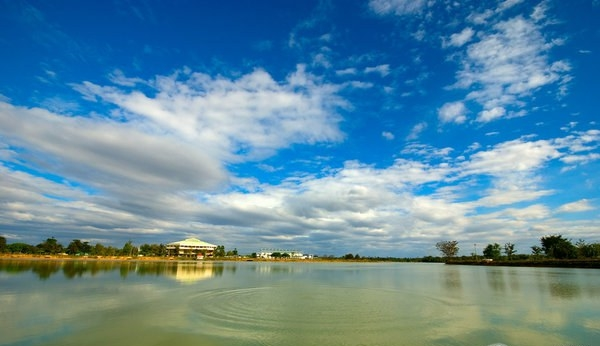
Lake on UBU campus

Ubon Ratchathani University (UBU) (Thai: มหาวิทยาลัยอุบลราชธานี RTGS: Mahawitthayalai Ubon Ratchathani) was established as a campus of Khon Kaen University, Thailand, in September 1987. It gained independent university status in 1990.

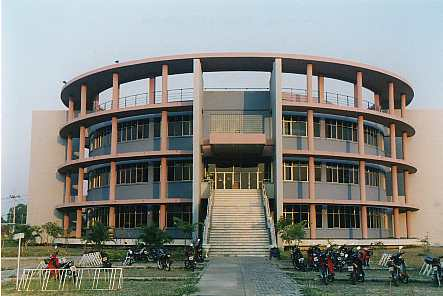
UBU Main library

== History ==
Ubon Ratchathani University (UBU) was founded in 1987 under the name Ubon Ratchathani College, as a regional campus of Khon Kaen University. It was established as a university by the Royal Charter in 1990, the 19th public university under the Ministry of University Affairs.

UBU is located at Warin Chamrap district, Ubon Ratchathani province, on a total area of approximately 5,228 rai. The university is connected to Warin Chamrap and Mueang Ubon Ratchathani district by transportation routes. It is approximately 30 mins from Ubon ratchathani airport and 15 mins from Ubon ratchathani train station.

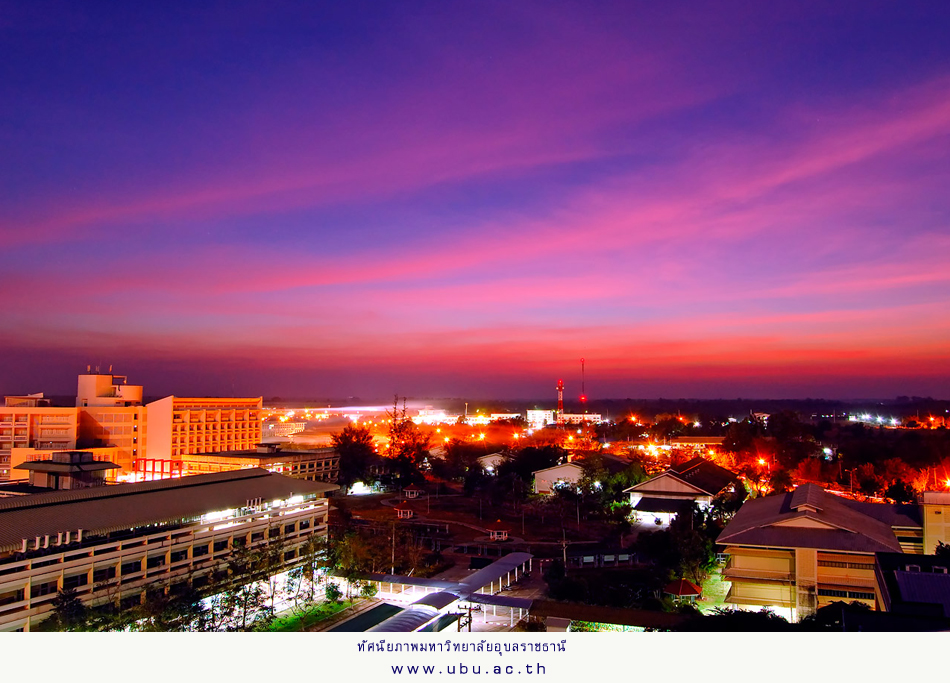
UBU Night View

== Semester times ==
UBU mainly operates on a two-semester program. For Academic Year 2020, semester 1 is from 22 June 2020 to 30 October 2020 and Semester 2 is from 9 November 2020 to 20 March 2021. There are few courses in the summer semester which is from 5 April 2021 to 22 May 2021.

== Academic ==
=== Faculties and College ===
There are 11 faculties and 1 college in three cluster

Health Sciences

- Faculty of Nursing
- Faculty of Pharmaceutical Sciences
- College of Medicine and Public Health
- Faculty of Dentistry (Project)

Sciences and Technology

- Faculty of Agriculture
- Faculty of Engineering
- Faculty of Science

Humanities and Social Sciences

- Faculty of Applied Arts and Architecture
- Faculty of Education
- Faculty of Law
- Faculty of Liberal Arts
- Faculty of Management Science (Ubon Ratchathani Business School)
- Faculty of Political Science

=== English Programs ===
- International Business Management (BBA) at Ubon Ratchathani Business School
  - Commerce and International Marketing
  - Supply Chain Management
- Business English (BA) at Faculty of Liberal Arts

== Notable alumni ==
- Srimuang Charoensiri, former Minister of Education
- Pracha Prasobdee, former Deputy Minister of Interior
