= Puliyannoor Mahadeva Temple =

- പുലിയന്നൂർ മഹാദേവ ക്ഷേത്രം
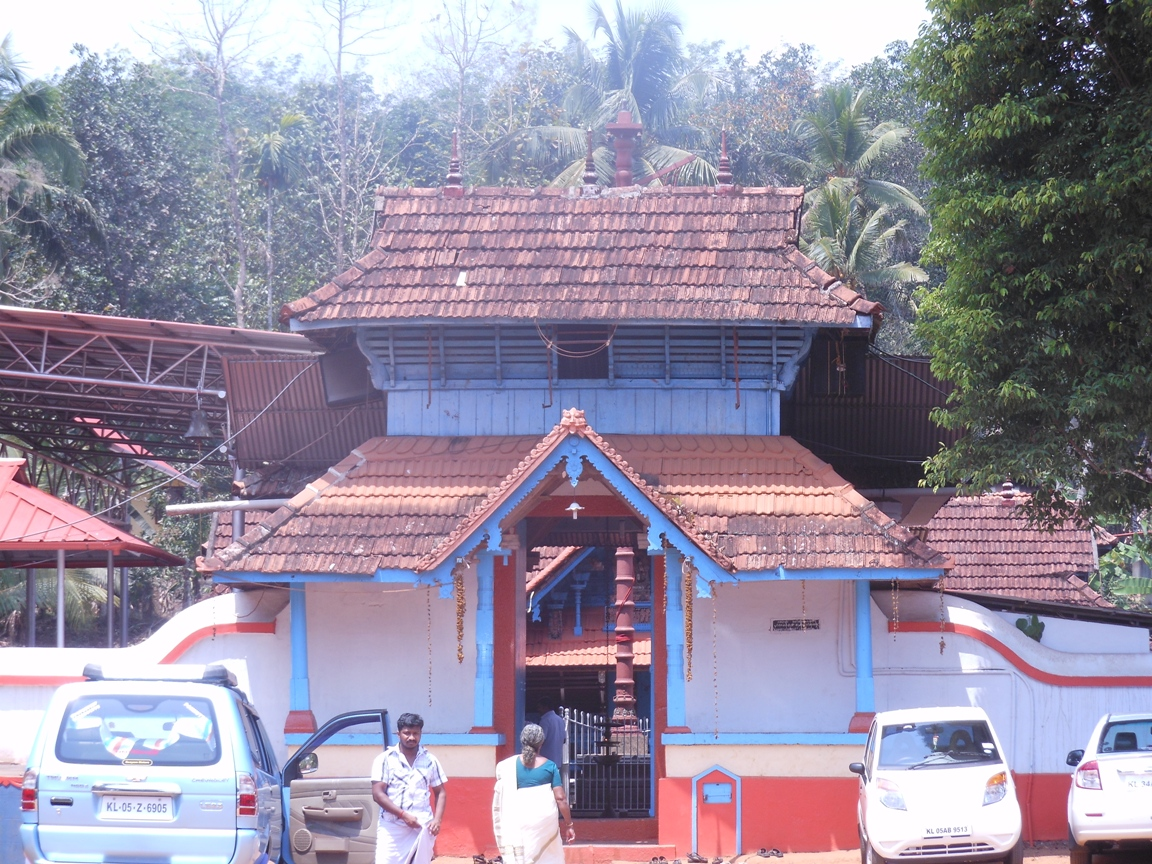
- Main Gopuram (tower) of the temple

- Location in Kerala

Religion
- Affiliation: Hinduism
- District: Kottayam
- Deity: Shiva as Puliyannoorappan
- Festivals: Thiruvutsavam in Kumbham, Maha Shivaratri
- Governing body: Puliyannoor Oorayma temple Devaswom

Location
- Location: Puliyannoor
- State: Kerala
- Country: India
- Coordinates: 9°41′55″N 76°37′59″E

Architecture
- Type: Traditional Kerala style
- Creator: Chathamplackal Chonar Chettiar

Puliyannoor Mahadeva Temple is a Hindu temple. It is located in Puliyannoor in Mutholy panchayath and near Pala in Kottayam district in the Indian state of Kerala. it is commonly known as “Cheruthil Valuthu Puliyannoor” (big among the small). The Namboothiri families known as 'Puliyannoor Oorayma Temple Devaswom' administer the temple. It is about 3 km (1.9 mi) from Pala and 13 km (8.1 mi) from Ettumanoor.

== Deity ==
The temple is dedicated to Lord Shiva. Ganapathi, Yogeeswara, Sastha, Nāga, Krishna, Devi and Yakshiyamma are the subordinate deities.

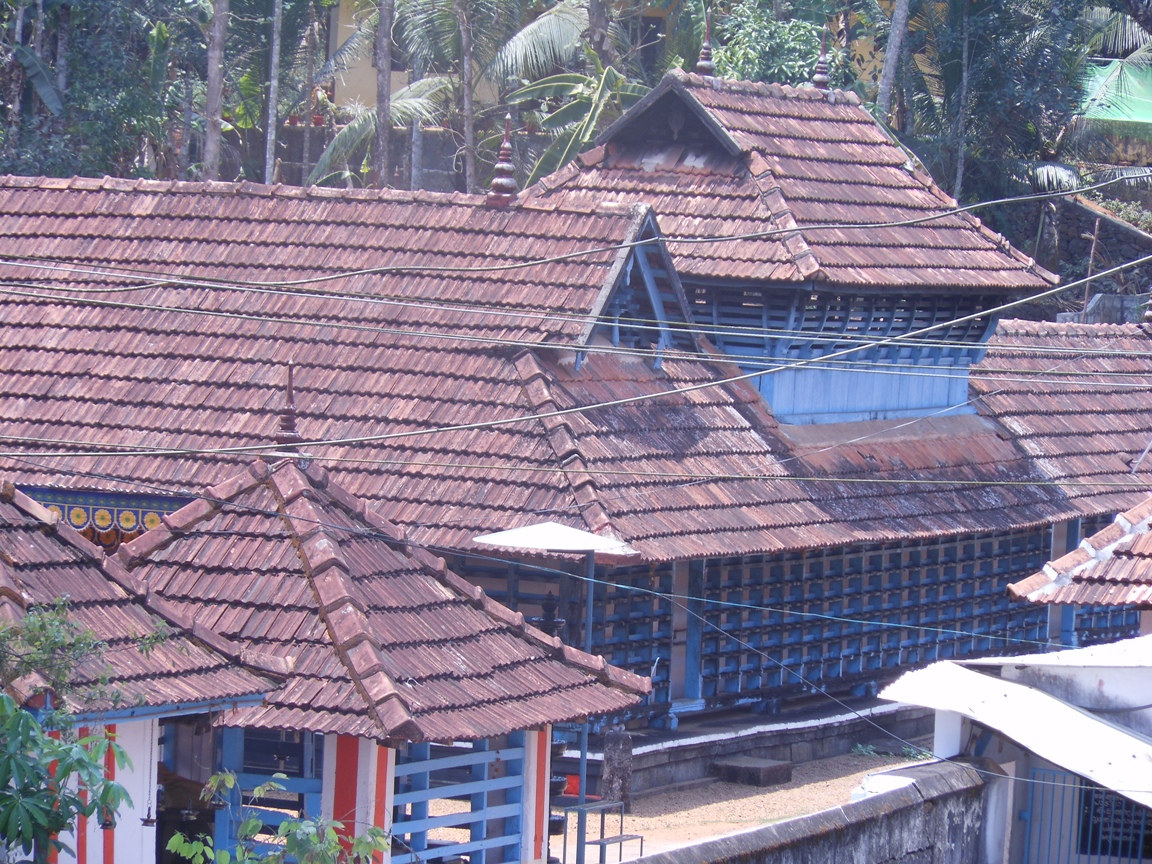
The temple structure

== History ==
The temple was built by a person named “Chathamplackal (Nalonnil) Chonar Chettiar”.

== Festivals ==
The annual festival is hosted in the Malayalam month of 'Kumbham' (i.e. February/March) for eight days. Apart from the annual festival, Vishu, Navratri, Mandala - Makaravilakku and Maha Shivarathri are other important festivals.
