= Puliyannoor =

- village
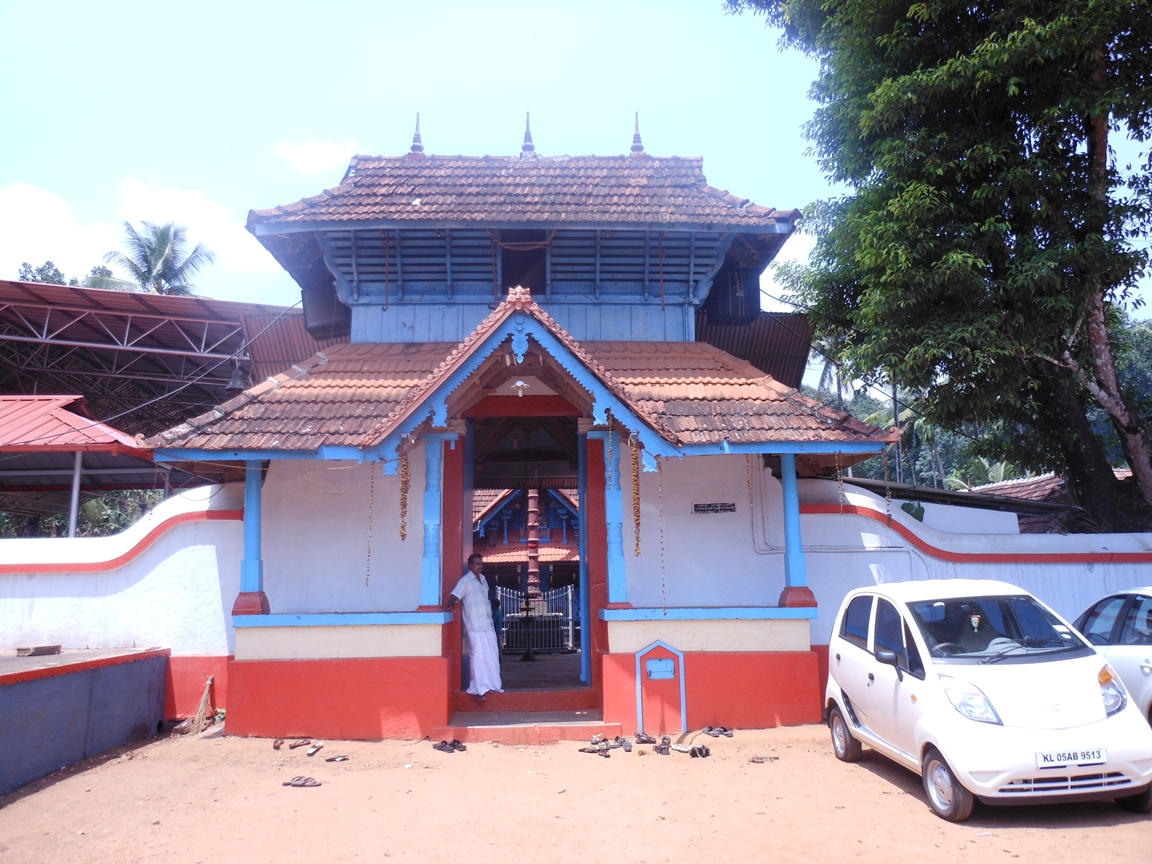
- Shiva Temple
- Country: India
- State: Kerala
- District: Kottayam

Government
  - Type: Panchayati raj (India)
  - Body: Gram panchayat

Population (2011)
  - Total: 15,414

Languages
  - Official: Malayalam, English
- Time zone: UTC+5:30 (IST)
- Vehicle registration: KL-35

Puliyannoor is a village in Kottayam district in the state of Kerala, India. It is located on the state highway leading to Ettumanoor.

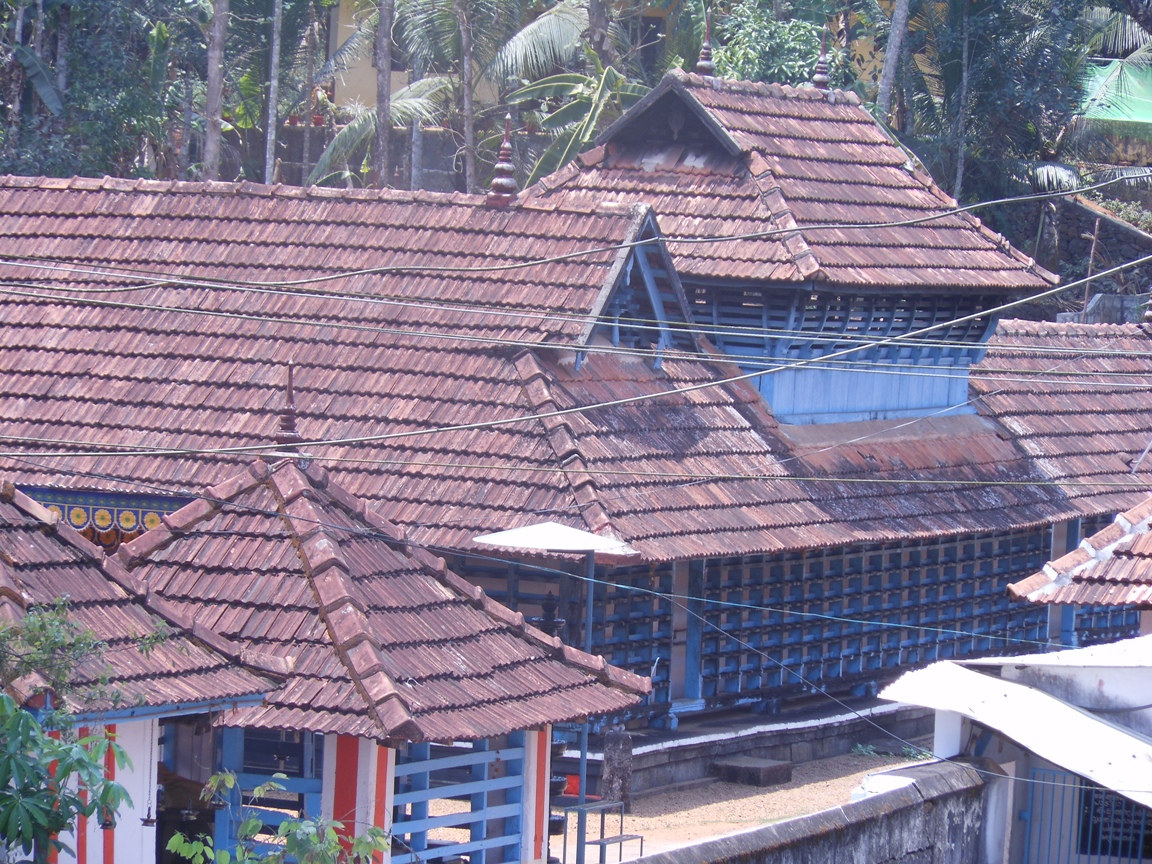
Puliyannoor temple

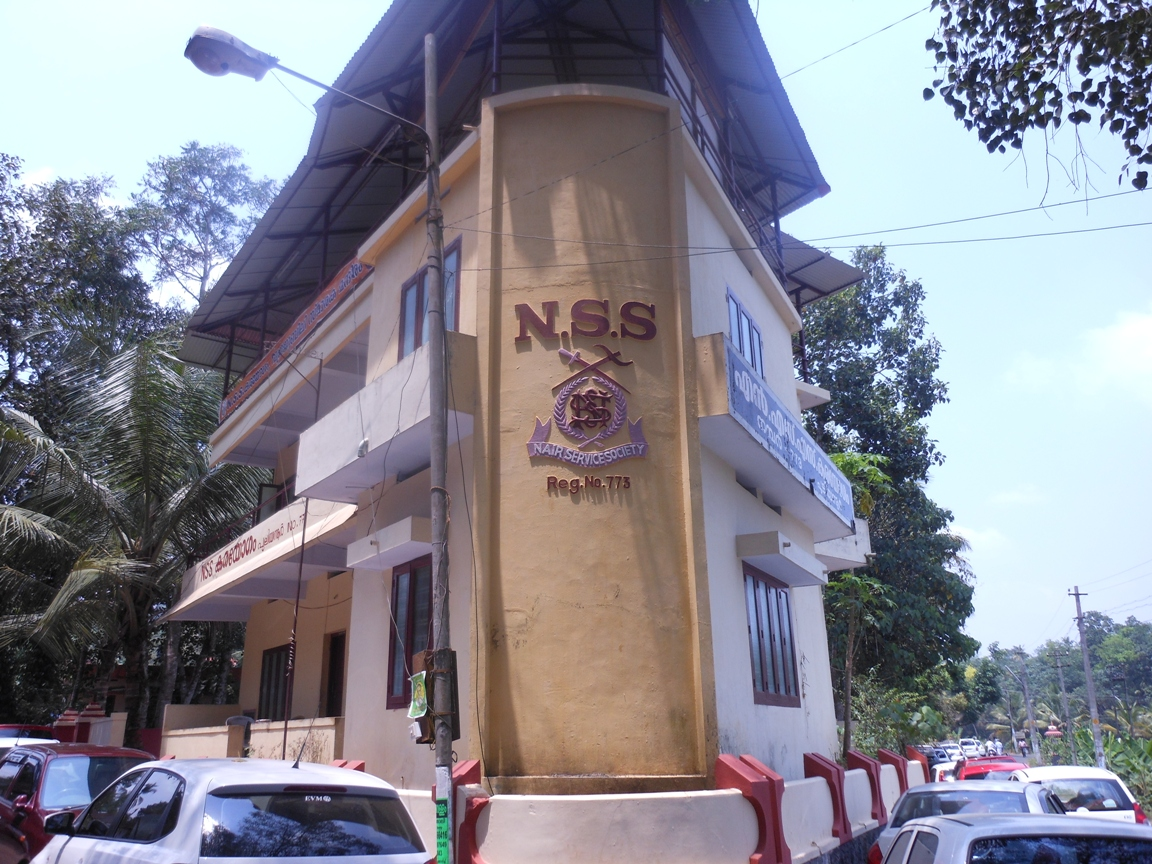
Nair Community Center

== Demographics ==
As of 2011 India census, Puliyannoor had a population of 15414 with 7487 males and 7927 females.

== Sri Mahadeva temple ==
Puliyannoor Mahadeva Temple is a temple dedicated to Lord Shiva, located in the Mutholy Panchayat. The temple is well known as 'Cheruthil Valuthu', meaning 'Big among small'. It is managed by Namboothiri families known as the Puliyannoor Oorayma Temple Devaswam (Endanthuruthi illom, Thuruthipalli illom, Elambilakkodu illom). It is situated close to the Kadappattoor temple, which attracts many pilgrims during the Sabarimala season.
