= Yakshini =

Class of nature spirits in Hindu, Buddhist, and Jain religious mythologies

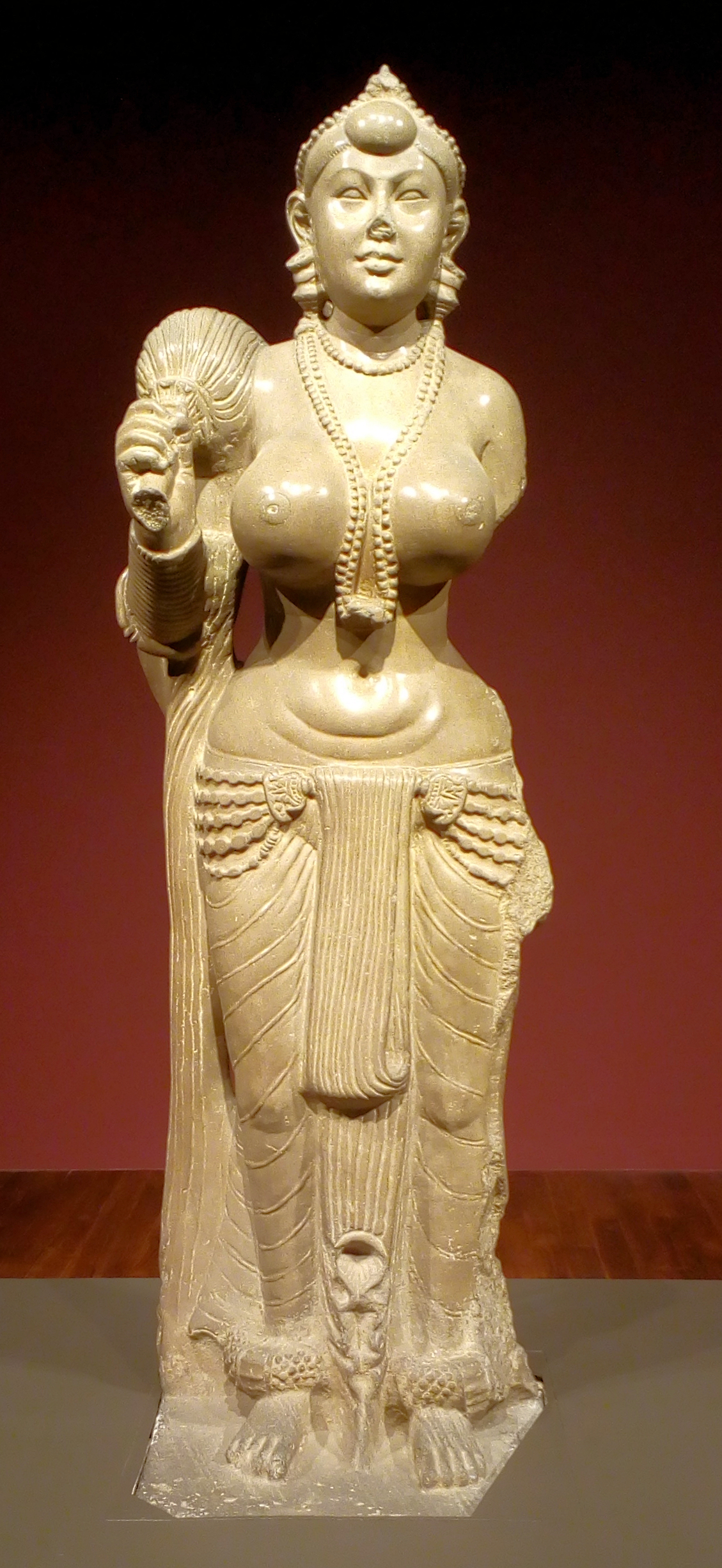
- Didarganj Yakshi; 3rd century BCE – 2nd century CE Patna Museum, Patna
- Devanagari: यक्षिणी
- Affiliation: Devi

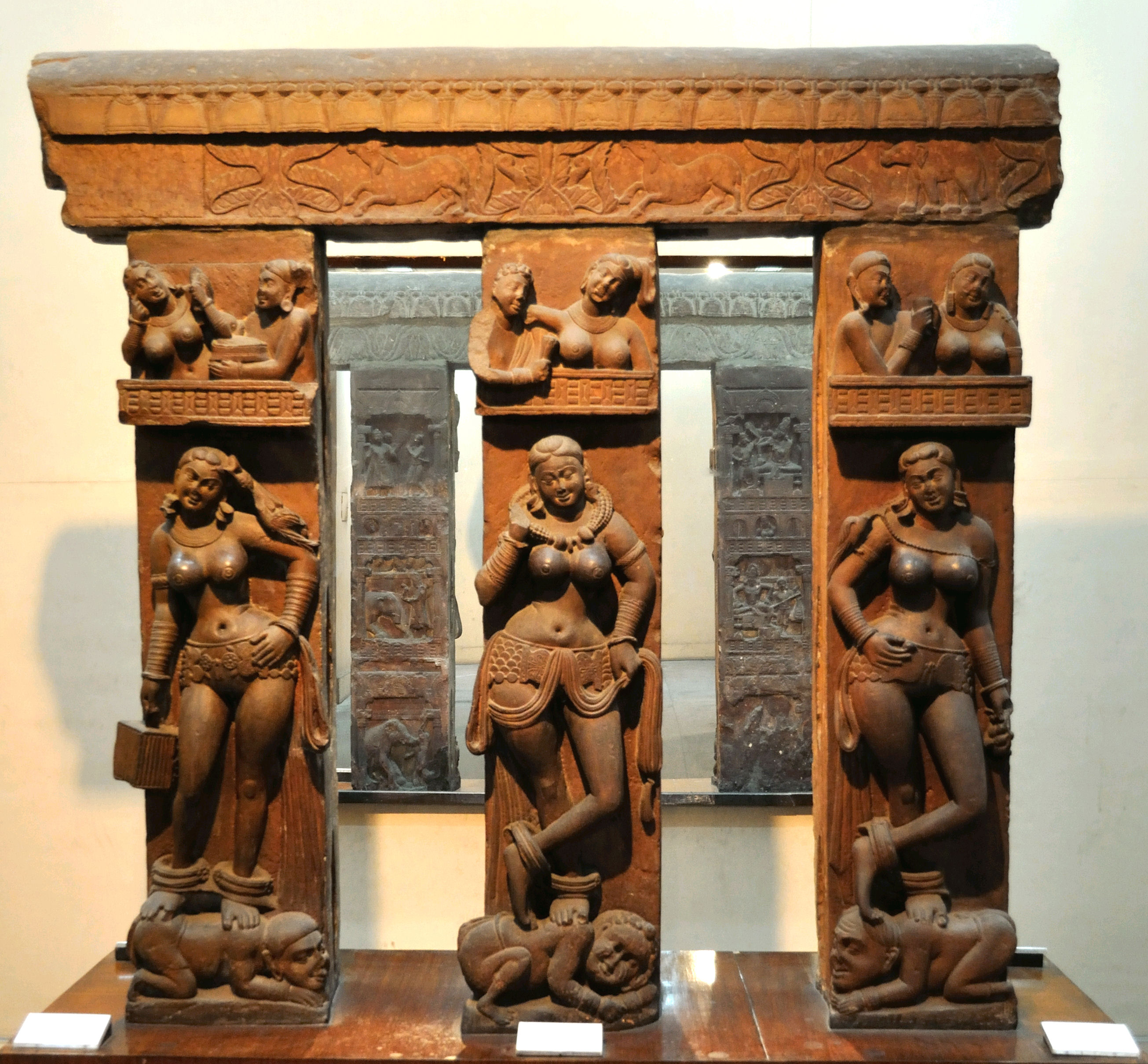
The Bhutesvara Yakshis, Mathura, 2nd century CE.

Yakshinis or Yakshis (Sanskrit: यक्षिणी, IAST: Yakṣiṇī or Yakṣī, IPA: [jɐkʂiɳiː, jɐkʂiː]; Prakrit: Yakkhiṇī or Yakkhī, IPA: [jɐkːʰiɳiː, jɐkːʰiː]) are a class of female nature spirits in Hindu, Buddhist, and Jain religious mythologies. Yakshinis and their male counterparts, the Yakshas, are among the many divine or semi-divine beings traditionally associated with the sacred groves of India. Yakshis appear in the traditional legends of Northeastern Indian tribes, ancient legends of Kerala, and in the folktales of Kashmiris. Sikhism also mentions yakshas in its sacred texts. Yakshinis are different from Devas, Asuras, Gandharvas and Apsaras.

Well-behaved and benign yakshinis are worshipped as tutelaries, as they are attendees of Kubera, the treasurer of the gods, and the Hindu god of wealth who rules the kingdom of Alaka. There are also malign and mischievous yakshinis with poltergeist-like behaviours that can haunt and curse humans, according to Indian folklore.

Yakshinis are beings of a non-human species. The number of Yakshinis is innumerable. They are believed to possess various kinds of powers. Different Yakshinis are considered to fulfill different tasks and desires, hence Yakshinis are also immortal. They are believed to have existed since the beginning of creation and to continue existing in the future as well.

tics of the Yakshi figure such as her nudity, smiling face and evident (often exaggerated) secondary sexual characteristics that lead to their association with fertility. The yakshi is usually shown with her hand touching a tree branch, in a sinuous tribhanga pose, thus some authors hold that the young girl at the foot of the tree is based on an ancient tree deity.

Yakshis were important in early Buddhist monuments as a decorative element and are found in many ancient Buddhist archaeological sites. They became Salabhanjikas (sal tree maidens) with the passing of the centuries, a standard decorative element of both Indian sculpture and Indian temple architecture.

The sal tree (Shorea robusta) is often confused with the ashoka tree (Saraca indica) in the ancient literature of the Indian Subcontinent. The position of the Salabhanjika is also related to the position of Queen Māyā of Sakya when she gave birth to Gautama Buddha under an asoka tree in a garden in Lumbini, while grasping its branch.

== List of yakshini found in Buddhist literature ==
Below is a nonexhaustive list of yakshinis found in Buddhist literature:

- Hārītī
- Ālikā
- Vendā
- Anopamā
- Vimalaprabhā
- Śrī
- Śankhinī
- Meghā
- Timisikā
- Prabhāvatī
- Bhīmā
- Haritā
- Mahādevī
- Nālī
- Udaryā
- Kuntī
- Sulocanā
- Śubhru
- Susvarā
- Sumatī
- Vasumatī
- Citrākṣī
- Pūrnasniṣā
- Guhykā
- Suguhyakā
- Mekhalā
- Sumekhalā
- Padmocchā
- Abhayā
- Jayā
- Vijayā
- Revatikā
- Keśinī
- Keśāntā
- Anila
- Manoharā
- Manovatī
- Kusumavatī
- Kusumapuravāsinī
- Pingalā
- Vīramatī
- Vīrā
- Suvīrā
- Sughorā
- Ghorā
- Ghorāvatī
- Surāsundari
- Surasā
- Guhyottamārī
- Vaṭavāsinī
- Aśokā
- Andhārasunarī
- Ālokasunarī
- Prabhāvatī
- Atiśayavatī
- Rūpavatī
- Surūpā
- Asitā
- Saumyā
- Kāṇā
- Menā
- Nandinī
- Upanandinī
- Lokāntarā
- Kuvaṇṇā (Pali)
- Cetiyā (Pali)
- Piyaṅkaramātā (Pali)
- Punabbasumātā (Pali)
- Bhesakalā (Pali)

== In Hinduism ==
In the Uddamareshvara Tantra, thirty-six yakshinis are described, including their mantras and ritual prescriptions. A similar list of yakshas and yakshinis are given in the Tantraraja Tantra, where it says that these beings are givers of whatever is desired. They are the guardians of the treasure hidden in the earth.They can be Sattvik, Rajas or Tamas in nature.

=== 36 Yakshinis ===
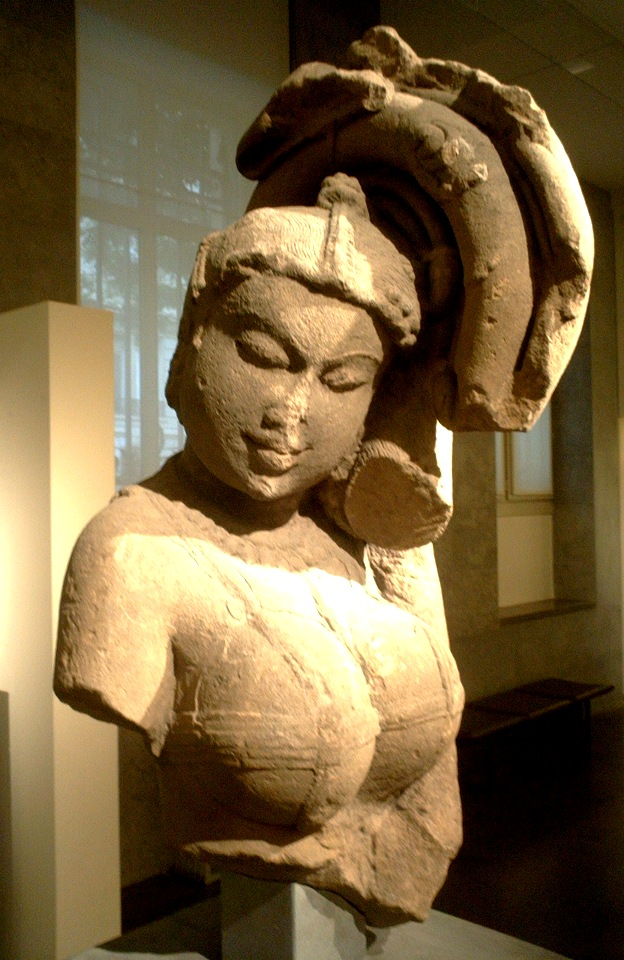
A Yakshin, 10th century, Mathura, India. Guimet Museum.

The sadhak can take yakshini as mother, sister or wife before commencing it. Proper mantra dikshaa from guru can speed up the mantra siddhi. They can be invoked with mantra "Om hreem shreem nityadravae mada (yakshini name) shreem hreem". The list of thirty six yakshinis given in the Uddamareshvara Tantra is as follows, along with some of the associated legends:

1. Vichitra (The Lovely One)
2. Vibhrama (Amorous One)
3. Hamsi (The one with Swan)
4. Bhishani (The Terrifying)
5. Janaranjika (One who is charming)
6. Vishala (Large Eyed)
7. Madana (Lustful)
8. Ghanta (Bell)
9. Kalakarni (Ears Adorned with Kalas)
10. Mahabhaya (Greatly Fearful)
11. Mahendri (Greatly Powerful)
12. Shankhini (Conch Girl )
13. Chandri (Moon Girl)
14. Shmashana (Cremation Ground Girl )
15. Vatayakshini
16. Mekhala (Love Girdle)
17. Vikala
18. Lakshmi (Wealth)
19. Malini (Flower Girl )
20. Shatapatrika (100 Flowers )
21. Sulochana (Lovely Eyed)
22. Shobha
23. Kapalini (Skull Girl)
24. Varayakshini
25. Nati (Actress)
26. Kameshvari
27. Dhana yakshini
28. Karnapisachi
29. Manohara (Fascinating)
30. Pramoda (Fragrant)
31. Anuragini (Very Passionate)
32. Nakhakeshi: She gives fruit on Siddhi.
33. Bhamini
34. Padmini
35. Svarnavati:
36. Ratipriya (Fond of Love)

== In Jainism ==
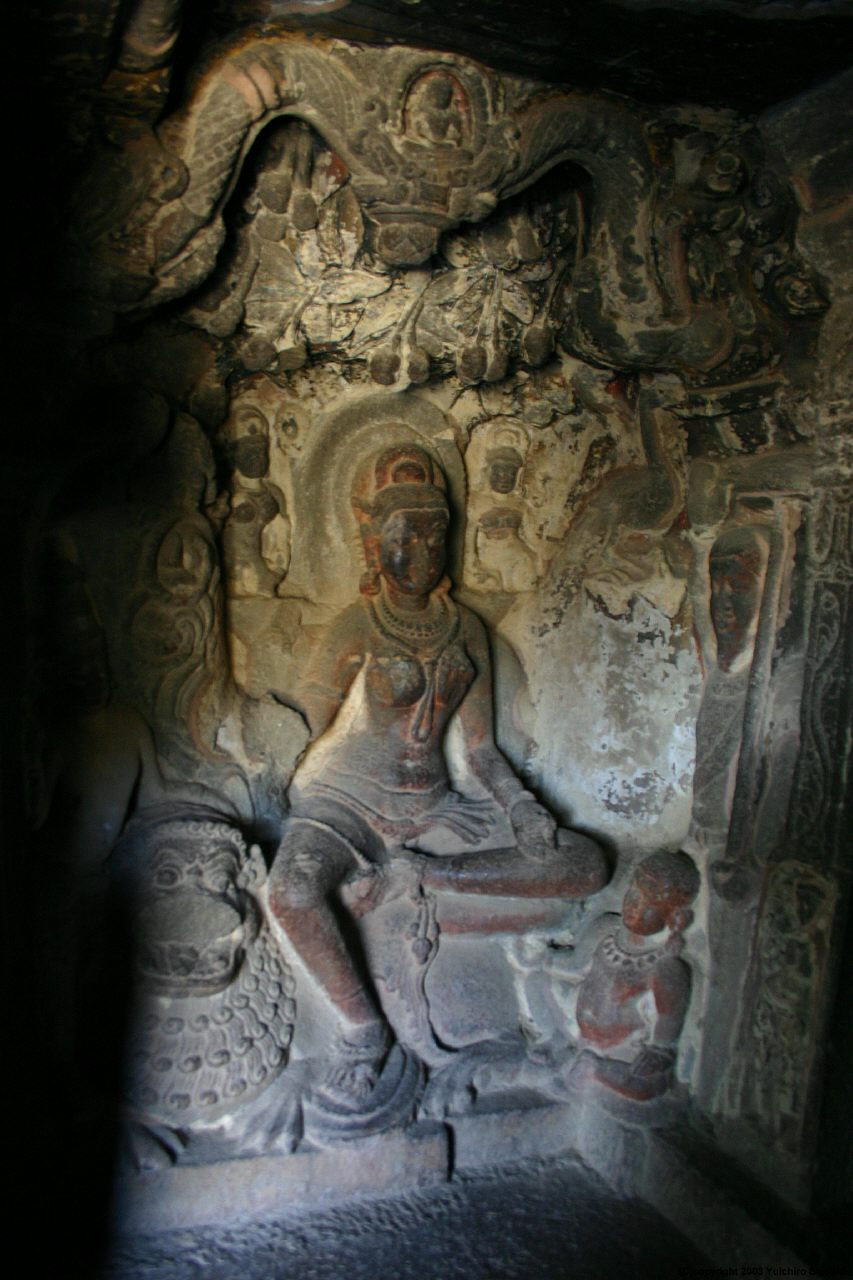
An image of Jain goddess Ambika in Cave 34 of the Ellora Caves

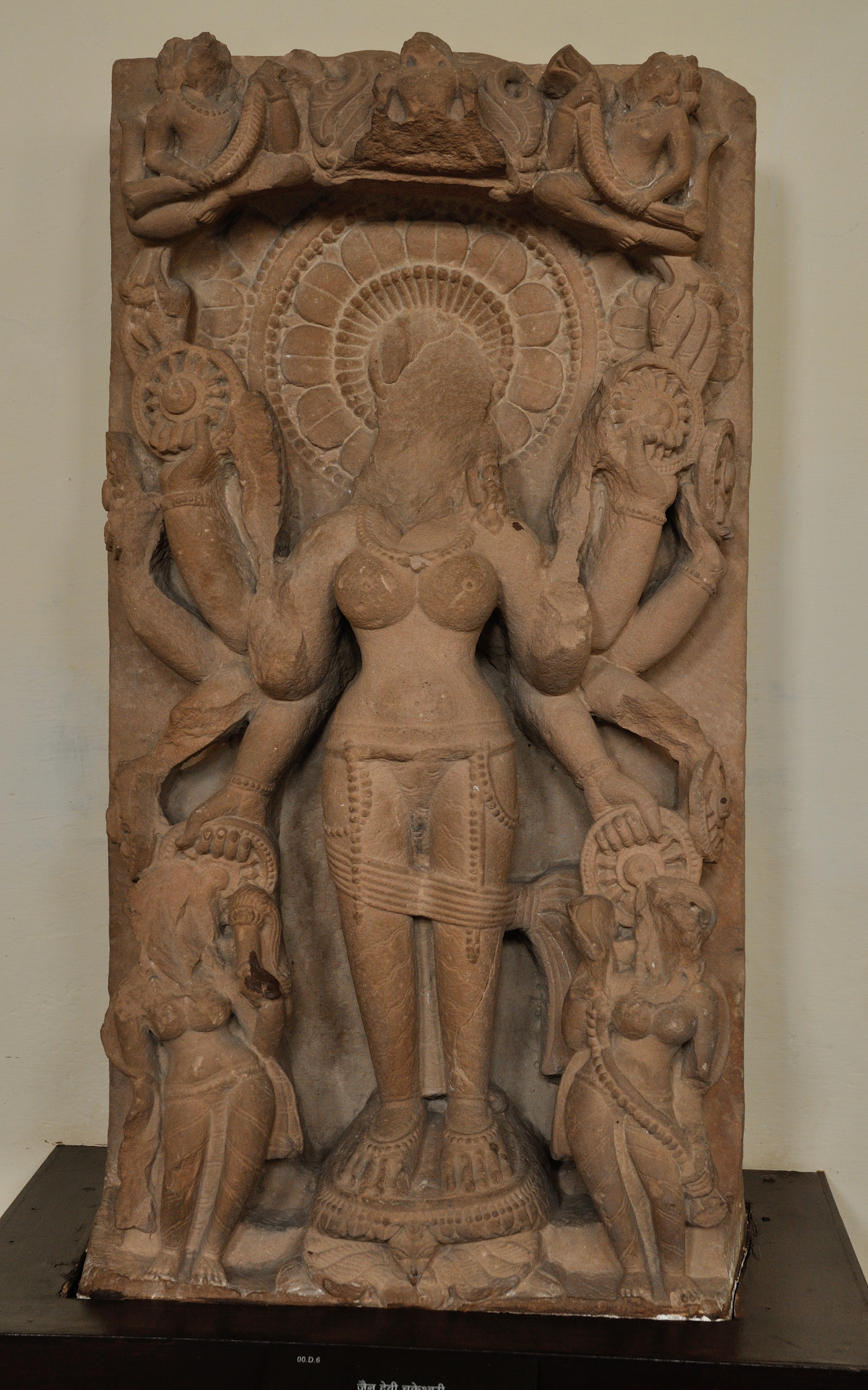
An image of Jain goddess Chakreshvari, c. 10th century, Mathura Museum

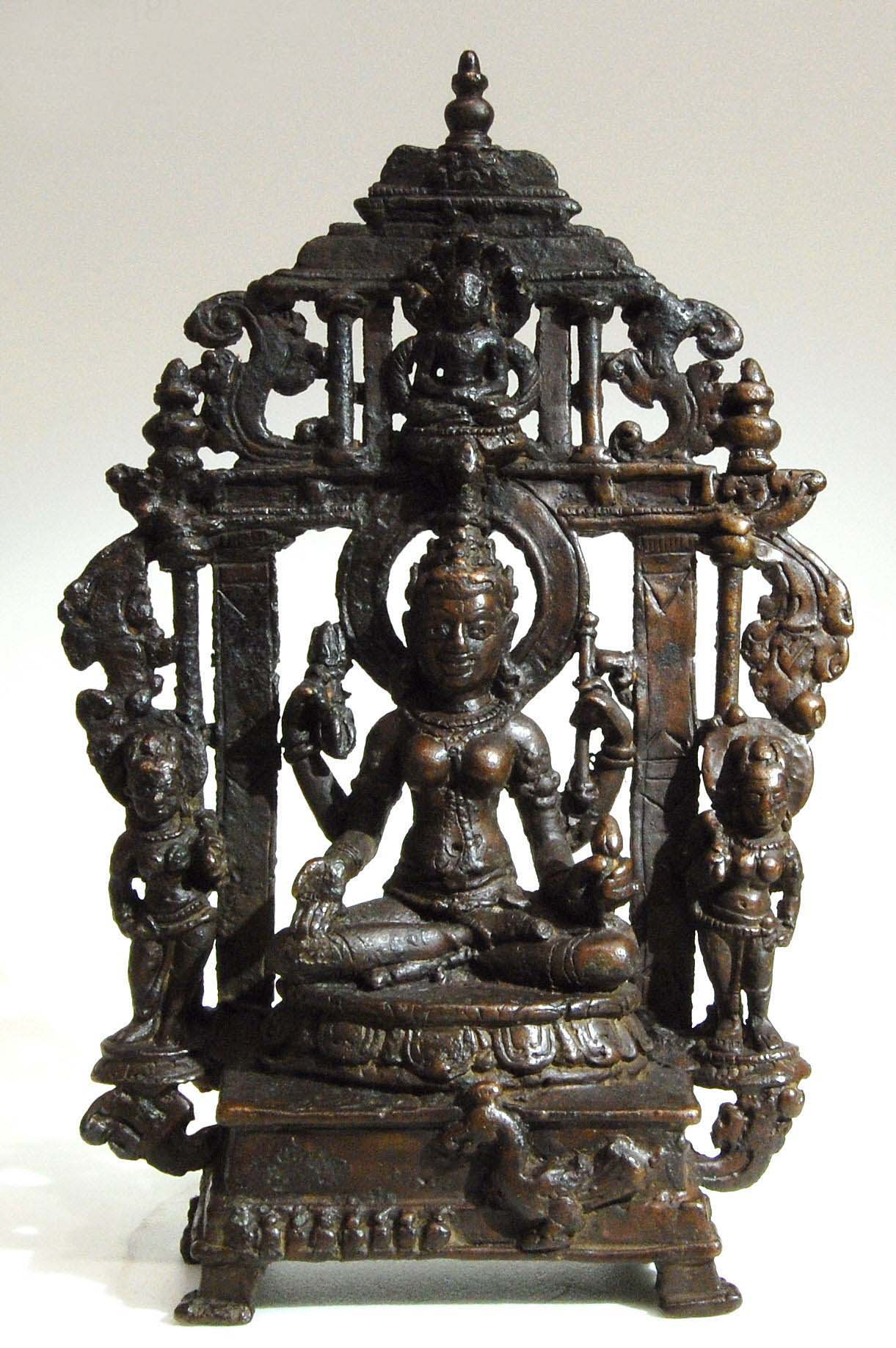
Padmavati, 10th century, Metropolitan Museum of Art

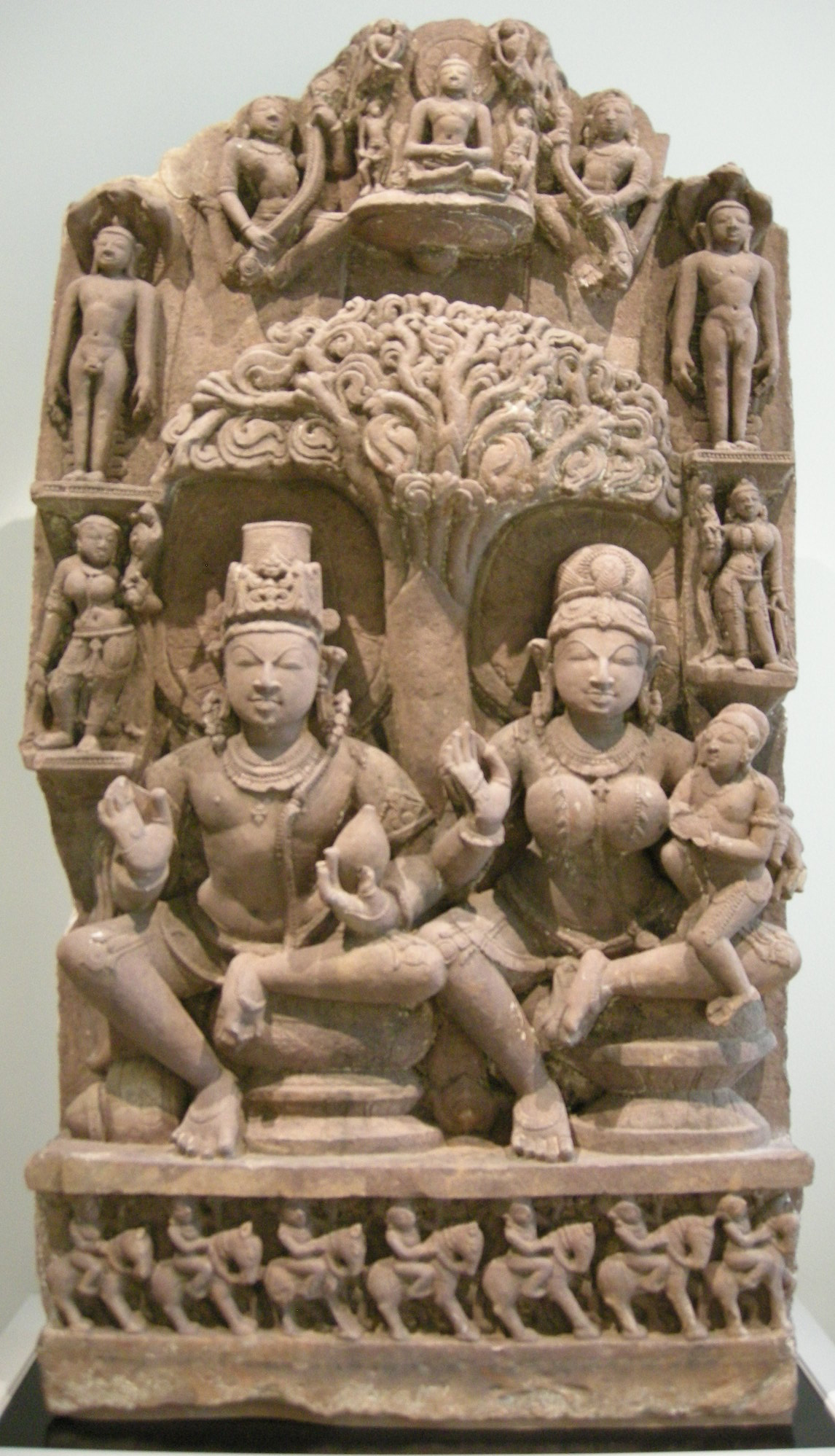
Yaksha and yakshini couple Sarvānubhūti and Kuṣmāṇḍinī, with the Tirthankaras, 11th century.

In Jainism, there are twenty-five yakshis, including Panchanguli, Chakreshvari, Ambika, and Padmavati, who are frequently represented in Jain temples. Each is regarded as the guardian goddess of one of the present tirthankar Shri Simandhar Swami and twenty-four Jain tirthankara. The names according to Tiloyapannatti (or Pratishthasarasangraha) and Abhidhanachintamani are:

- Panchanguli
- Chakreshvari
- Rohini, Ajitbala
- Prajnapti, Duritari
- Vajrashrankhala, Kali
- Vajrankusha, Mahakali
- Manovega, Shyama
- Kali, Shanta
- Jwalamalini, Mahajwala
- Mahakali, Sutaraka
- Manavi, Ashoka
- Gauri, Manavi
- Gandhari, Chanda
- Vairoti, Vidita
- Anantamati, Ankusha
- Manasi, Kandarpa
- Mahamansi, Nirvani
- Jaya, Bala
- Taradevi, Dharini
- Vijaya, Dharanpriya
- Aparajita, Nardatta
- Bahurupini, Gandhari
- Ambika or Kushmandini
- Padmavati
- Siddhayika

== Legendary yakshis of south India ==
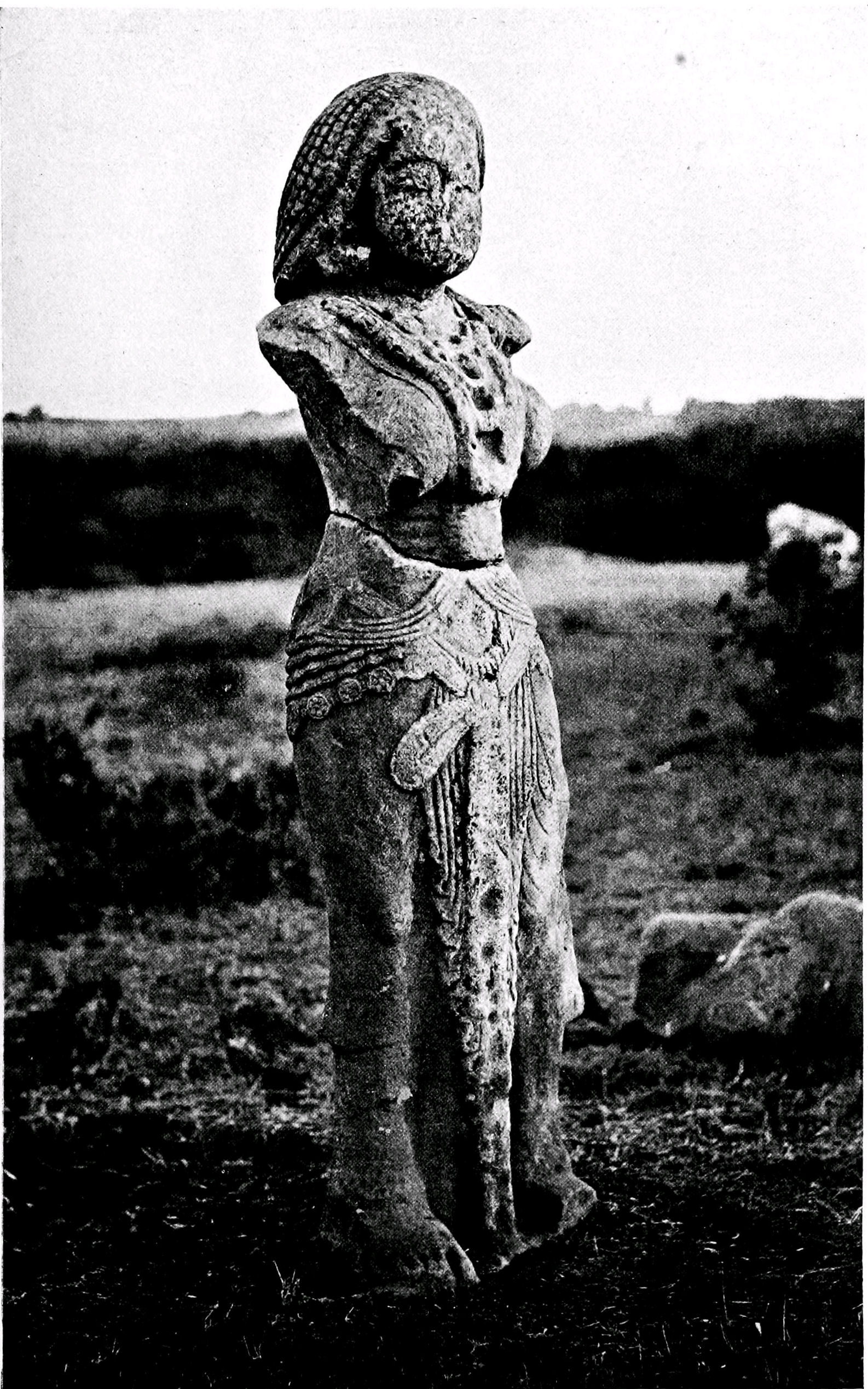
The Besnagar Yakshi, 3rd–1st century BC.

In the literature and folktales of Kerala, yakshis are generally not considered benevolent. Many folk stories feature murdered women reborn as vengeful yakshis, some of which are listed below. Aside from those mentioned below, yakshis are also featured in Malayatoor Ramakrishnan's 1967 novel Yakshi, which describes their world as having a blue sun, carpets of crimson grass, streams of molten silver, and flowers made of sapphires, emeralds, garnets, and topaz. In the novel, young yakshis fly around on the backs of giant dragonflies. According to Ramakrishnan's novel, adult yakshis are required to enter the land of the living once a year to feed on the blood of human men.

=== Chempakavally Ammal and Neelapilla Ammal ===
According to a legend from Thekkalai, next to Nagercoil in Tamil Nadu, a pair of beautiful sisters named Chempakavally and Neelapilla turned into vengeful yakshis after becoming victims of an honor killing by their father. Since their father killed them to keep them from the clutches of the lustful raja of the region, the sister yakshis tortured and killed everyone in the palace, and their father as well. The two yakshis haunted the place where they were killed until they were placated somewhat by many poojas and rituals and a temple constructed on the site. Idols of the sister yakshis are present inside. The older sister, Chempakavally, eventually transformed into a benevolent deity and traveled to Mount Kailash to worship Lord Shiva, while the younger sister, Neelapilla, remained ferocious. It is said that some of Neelapilla's devotees offer her the fingernail clippings or locks of hair from their enemies, beseeching her to destroy them.

=== Kalliyankattu Neeli ===
One of the most famous stories of legendary Yakshis of Kerala is that of Kalliyankattu Neeli, who was said to be a Yakshi with divine beauty, who later assumed the form of a goddess. The Yakshi theme is the subject of popular Keralite tales, like the legend of the Yakshi of Thiruvananthapuram, as well as of certain movies in modern Malayalam cinema.

=== Kanjirottu Yakshi ===
Mangalathu Sreedevi or Chiruthevi, also known as Kanjirottu Yakshi, is a yakshi from the folklore of Kerala. According to legend, she was born into a Padamangalam Nair tharavad by name Mangalathu at Kanjiracode in South Travancore. She was also known as Chiruthevi. She was a ravishingly beautiful courtesan who had an intimate relationship with Raman Thampi, son of King Rama Varma and rival of Anizhom Thirunal Marthanda Varma. Made arrogant by her beauty and the adoration heaped on her by men, she enjoyed toying with men's lives and driving them to financial ruin.

However, Chiruthevi was truly in love with Kunjuraman, her palanquin-bearer, who was already married and uninterested in her romantically. In frustration, Chiruthevi arranged to have Kunjuraman's wife killed. Kunjuraman finally agreed to sleep with Chiruthevi, but then murdered her to avenge his wife.

Immediately after her death, Chiruthevi was reborn as a yakshi in the village of Kanjirottu, where she magically transformed into a beautiful woman mere moments after her birth. She terrorized men and drank their blood, and continued to harass Kunjuraman. Her frenzy only subsided after she made a deal with her br Mangalathu Govindan, a close associate of Kunjuraman and a great upāsaka (follower) of Lord Balarama. According to their agreement she would cohabit with Kunjuraman for a year on the condition that she would become a devotee of Narasimha after the year was up. She accordingly spent one year with Kunjuraman and later was installed at a temple which later came to be owned by Kanjiracottu Valiaveedu, though this temple no longer exists.

Reserve Bank of India headquarters, Delhi entrance with a yakshini sculpture (c. 1960) depicting "Prosperity through agriculture".

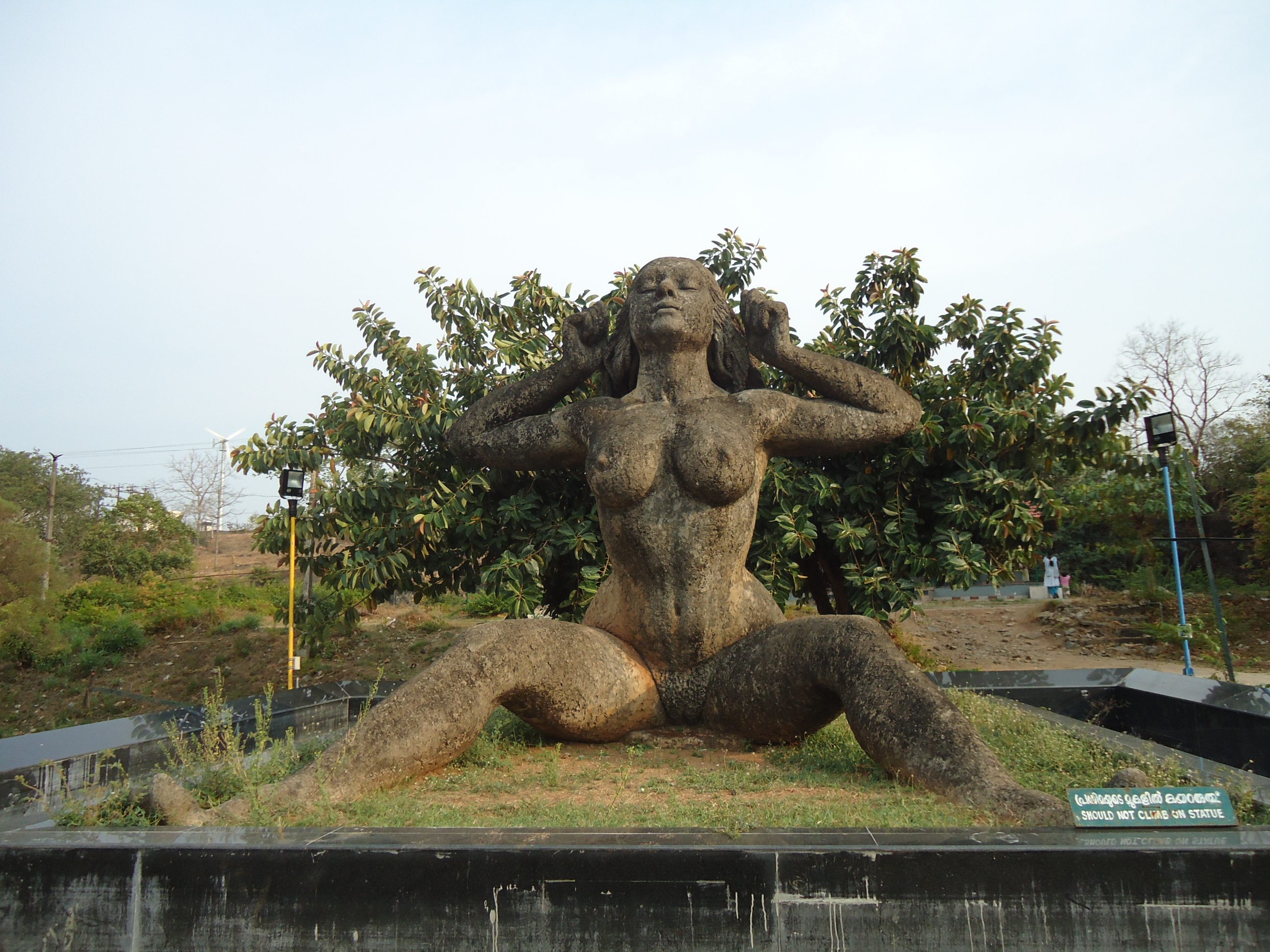
Statue of Yakshi by Kanayi Kunjiraman at Malampuzha Dam, Kerala

Sundara Lakshmi, an accomplished dancer and consort of HH Swathi Thirunal Rama Varma, was an ardent devotee of Kanjirottu Yakshi Amma.

The Kanjirottu yakshi is now said to reside in Vault B of Sri Padmanabhaswamy Temple in Thiruvananthapuram, Kerala, which supposedly also contains an enormous treasure. The enchanting and ferocious forms of this Yakshi are painted on the south-west part of Sri Padmanabha's shrine. The vault remains unopened due to ongoing legal issues and the legend of the Yakshi, whom some believe will wreak havoc on the world if her prayers to Lord Narasimha within Vault B are disturbed by opening the vault.

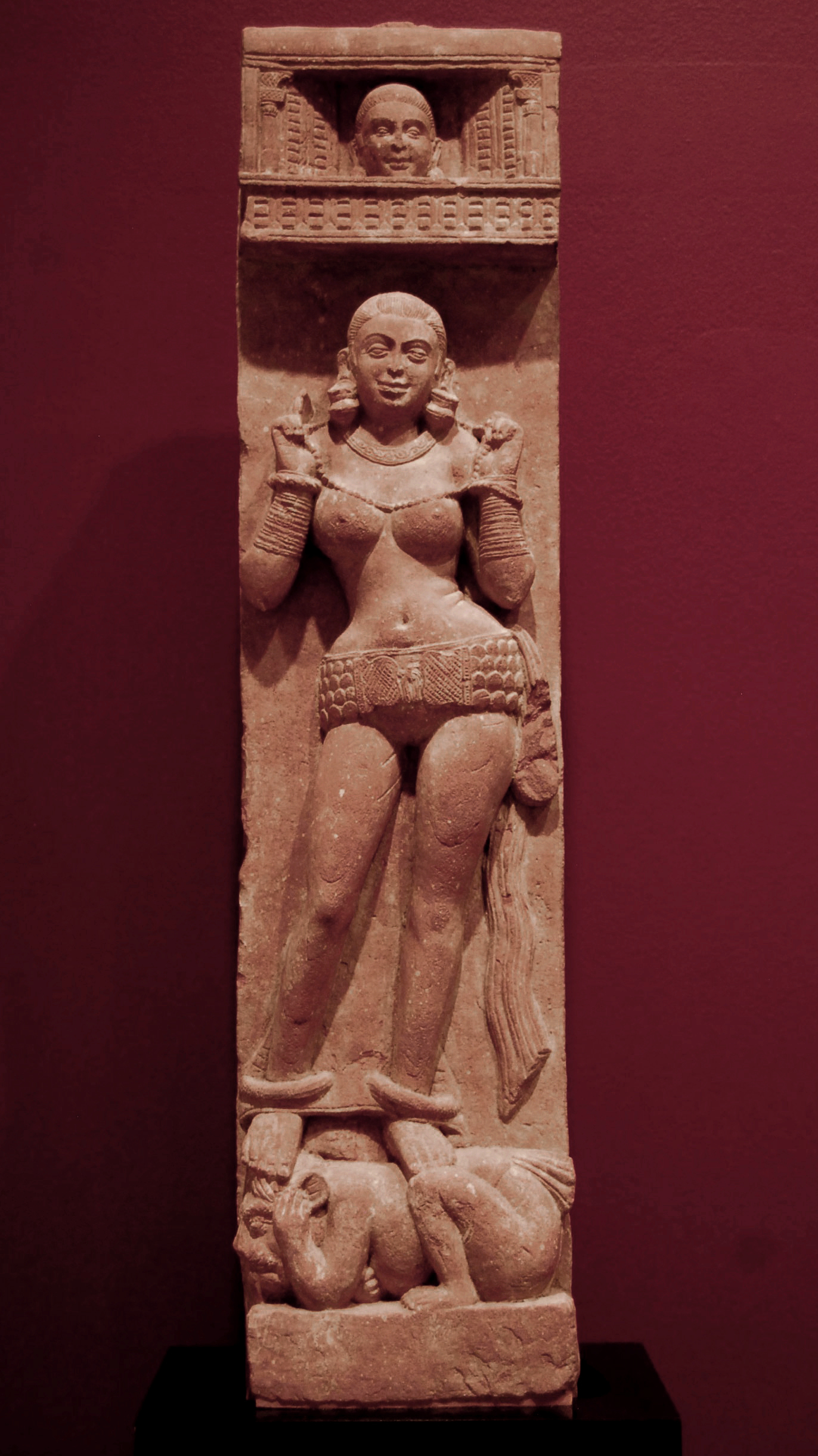
Red sandstone 2nd century Kushan Empire Mathura region, Dallas Museum of Art, USA.

== Beyond the Indian subcontinent and Hinduism ==
In China, Taiwan, and Japan yakshni are famous and well-known, such as Hariti, one of the Twenty-Four Protective Deities who are venerated as defenders of the Buddhist dharma in Mahayana Buddhism. The Kishimojin (Hariti) temple in Zoushigaya, Tokyo is dedicated to her.

In Thailand, yakshni are known and worshiped as deity guardians in Tai Folk religion and Thai folklore, showing the influence of Buddhism and Hinduism on Thai culture. Yakshini have spirit houses and shrines devoted to them as Tutelary deities in Thai folk religion. Examples include Nang Phisuea Samudra (ศาลนางผีเสื้อสมุทร), considered the deity guardian of Phisuea Samut Fort, Phra Samut Chedi District, Samut Prakan Province, Seang Chan Beach in Mueang Rayong district, and Rayong province; Nang Suphanapsron chomtevi (นางสุพรรณอัปสรจอมเทวี), considered the deity guardian of Wat Nang thakian (วัดนางตะเคียน) in Mueang Samut Songkhram district, and Samut Songkhram province; and Nang Panturat (ศาลนางพันธุรัตน์) from the Sang Thong, considered the deity guardian of Khao Nang Panthurat Forest Park, Khao Yai Sup district, Cha-am district, and Phetchaburi province.

In Myanmar, yakshni are known and worshiped as deity guardians in Myanmar folk religion and Burmese folklore, showing the influence of Buddhism and Hinduism on Burmese culture. Examples include Popa Medaw, the deity guardian of Popa mountain, and the yakshni deity guardian of the Shwedagon Pagoda.

== See also ==
- Apsara
- Fairy
- Houri
- Nariphon
- Nymph
- Salabhanjika
- Shitala
- Succubus
- Yogini
- List of tree deities
