= Saeng Chan Beach =

Beach in Thailand

Coordinates: 12.6657°N 101.2335°E

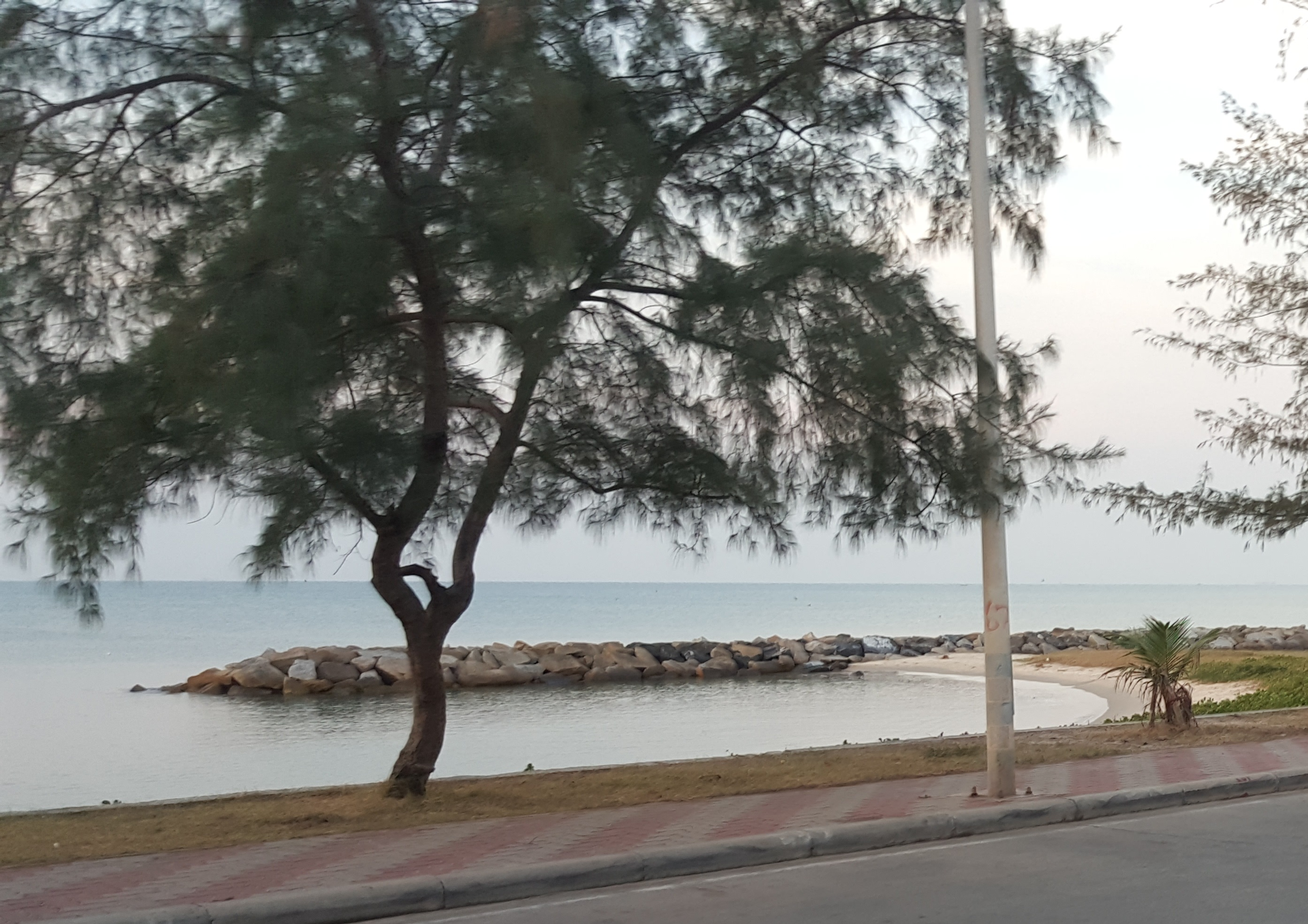

Saeng Chan Beach (Thai: หาดแสงจันทร์) is one of the best-known beaches in Rayong, Thailand. It is located approximately 6 kilometers (3.7 miles) from Rayong City. It is on the east coast of the Gulf of Thailand. It is one of four connected beaches that stretch for 11 kilometers along the bay, the others being Laem Charoen Beach, Suchada Beach, and Sai Thong Beach. There are few beach amenities, and the other side of the beach road where the seafood restaurants are located, is mostly undeveloped. Furthermore, this location was once a fishermen's village. Previously, when this beach was not widely known, villagers used to throw trash here. However, this beach is now being cleaned by the government, villagers, tourists, and volunteers.

== History ==
Saeng Chan Beach is one of many beaches along the Leab Chai Fang Road, together with Suchada Beach and Maerumpung Beach, which are adjacent to each other. In the past, this area was home to a fishing village that grew from Paknam Rayong.

The name of Saeng Chan Beach, "Saeng Chan" means “moonlight”. It is from the appearance of each pool of the coast that it looks like the moon crest concaves into the coast. In addition, Saeng Chan Beach also has another common name called "PMY Beach" which most people in the area called by the name of the hotel in the area that has been around for a long time.

One feature that distinguishes this beach from others is the presence of numerous man-made stone barriers running the length of the beach in the water. However, the stone barriers did not always exist. The reason for the barrier's construction was sea reclamation and the development of a port in the Map Ta Phut Industrial Estate, which altered the direction of wind and water currents, making coastal erosion more severe than before. As a result, the rocky barriers were designed to prevent those issues. As a result of the barriers’ presence, crescent-shaped pools formed and remain to this day.

Furthermore, when viewed from above, the appearance of rocky barriers on each coast can be seen, which are aligned in a T-shape along the beach alternating with crescent moon-shaped pools.

== Transportation ==
Saeng Chan Beach can be reached by car, with two main routes from Bangkok.

1. Sukhumvit Road: Running on the Sukhumvit Road before reaching Mueang Rayong, then turn right as long as the Saeng Chan Beach sign. The end of the road is a three-way intersection of the Sea Butterfly statue and Phra Apai mani statue. Then, turn right to reach the destination, Saeng Chan Beach.
2. Highway 36 : From Highway 36, pass the intersection at Map Ta Phut Industrial Estate. Then turn right at the next intersection, merge onto the Sukhumvit Road. After reaching the Sukhumvit Road, turn left to Rayong-Chanthaburi. Then continue driving to Leab Chai Fang Road, and then turn right to reach the destination, Saeng Chan Beach.

== Geography and climate ==
=== Geography ===
Saeng Chan Beach has a man-made rock embankment along the coast to prevent coastal erosion. Therefore, the pools have formed along the coast and formed in the shape of a crescent moon along the shoreline of Saeng Chan Beach.

=== Climate ===
- Sea temperature : The average sea temperature is 29°C. The coolest water is in January (27°C). The hottest water is in May (30°C).
- Average temperature : The temperature ranges from 21 °C to 33 °C, with temperatures rarely falling below 18 °C or rising above 35 °C.

== Neighborhoods ==
The list of places near Saeng Chan Beach

- Phra Chedi Klang Nam

It is one of the well-known chedis in Rayong. It is to the east of Saeng Chan Beach. It is located approximately 5 kilometers from the beach. Tourists can visit Phra Chedi Klang Nam from 6 a.m. to 5 p.m. It opens daily.

- Samed Island

It is the most populated island in Rayong. It is under the protection of the National Parks Division of the Thai government. It is to the southeast of Saeng Chan Beach. It is located approximately 30 kilometers from the beach.

- Rayong Province Stadium

It is a stadium in Rayong province which is currently used for football matches. It is to the north of Saeng Chan Beach. It is located approximately 3 kilometers from the beach. It opens daily from 8.30 a.m. to 4.30 p.m.

- Rayong Museum

The Rayong Old City Conservation Club established this museum with the goal of preserving the city's history and to be a compilation of Rayong's nice old artifacts such as old pictures or numerous equipment that depict the Rayong people's lives in the past. It is to the northeast of Saeng Chan beach. It is located approximately 6 kilometers from the beach. It opens daily except Saturday and Sunday from 8 a.m. to 8 p.m.

- Ko Kloi Market

The Ko Kloi Market sells food, traditional coffee, and souvenirs in a retro ambience with performances for visitors to enjoy. It is in the northeast of the Saeng Chan beach. It is located approximately 7 kilometers from the beach. It opens daily from 10 a.m. to 9 p.m.

- Pa Pradu Temple

It is a royal monastery. This historic temple was established during the reign of Ayutthaya. It is to the northeast of the Saeng Chan Beach. It is located approximately 6 kilometers from the beach. It opens daily from 8 a.m. to 5 p.m.

- Lum Mahachai Chumphon Temple

It is a royal monastery and it is an old temple since the Ayutthaya period. According to history, it was established in the year 1691. This temple is revered by the Rayong people. It is to the northeast of the Saeng Chan beach. It is located approximately 7 kilometers from the beach. It opens daily from 9 a.m. to 5 p.m.

== Gallery ==
Gallery of Saeng Chan Beach and neighborhoods.

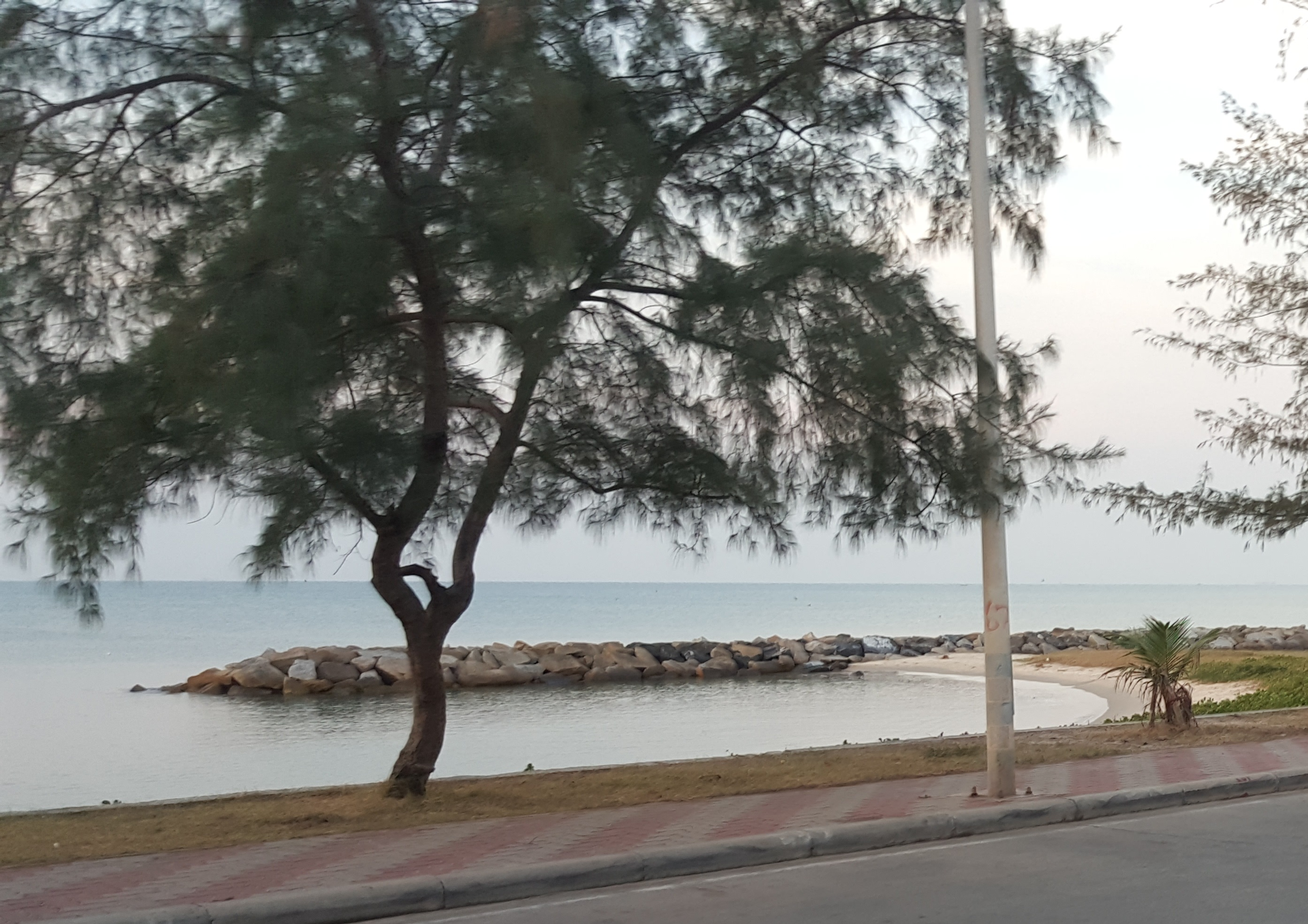
Saeng Chan Beach (1)

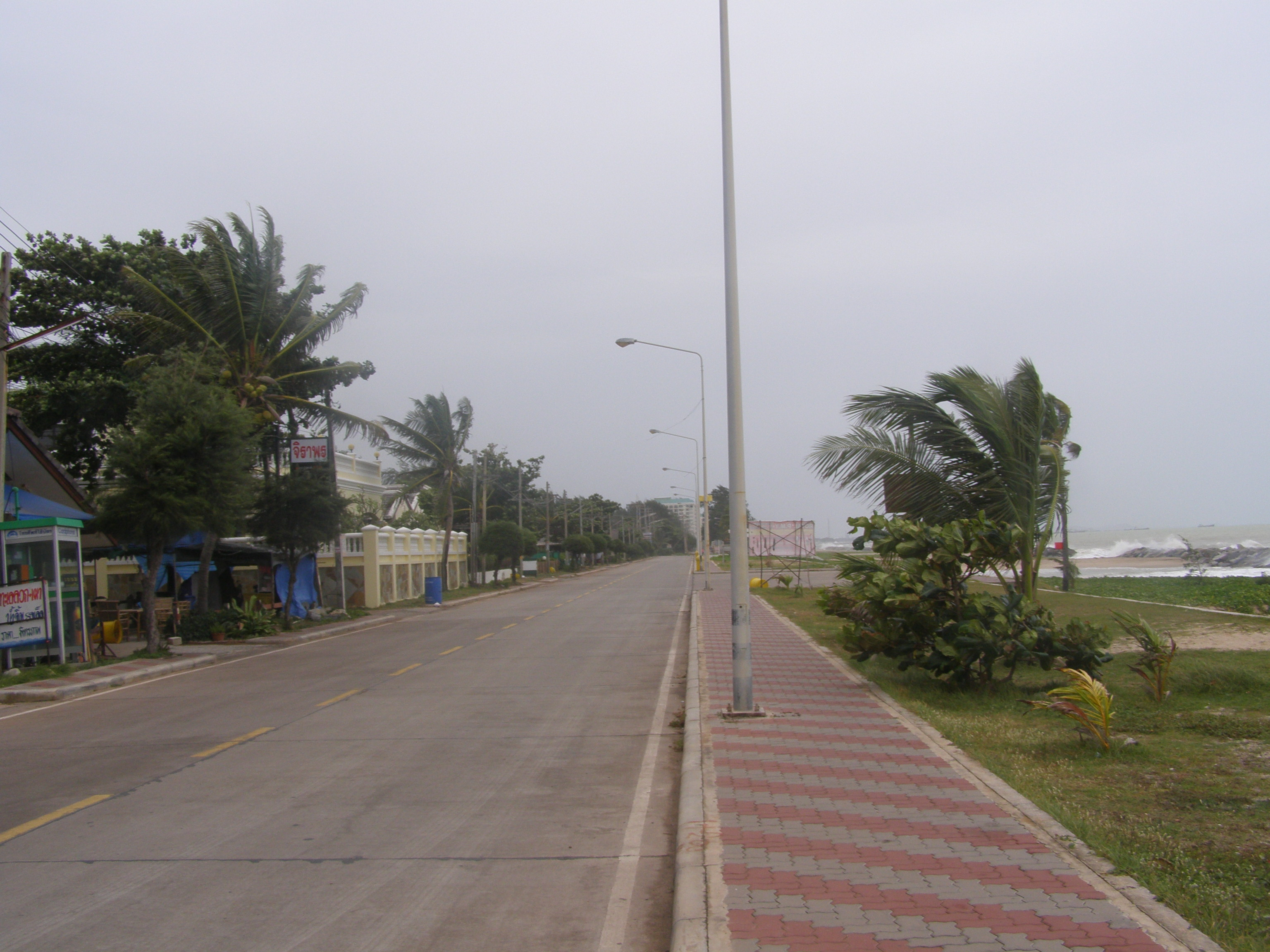
Saeng Chan Beach (2)

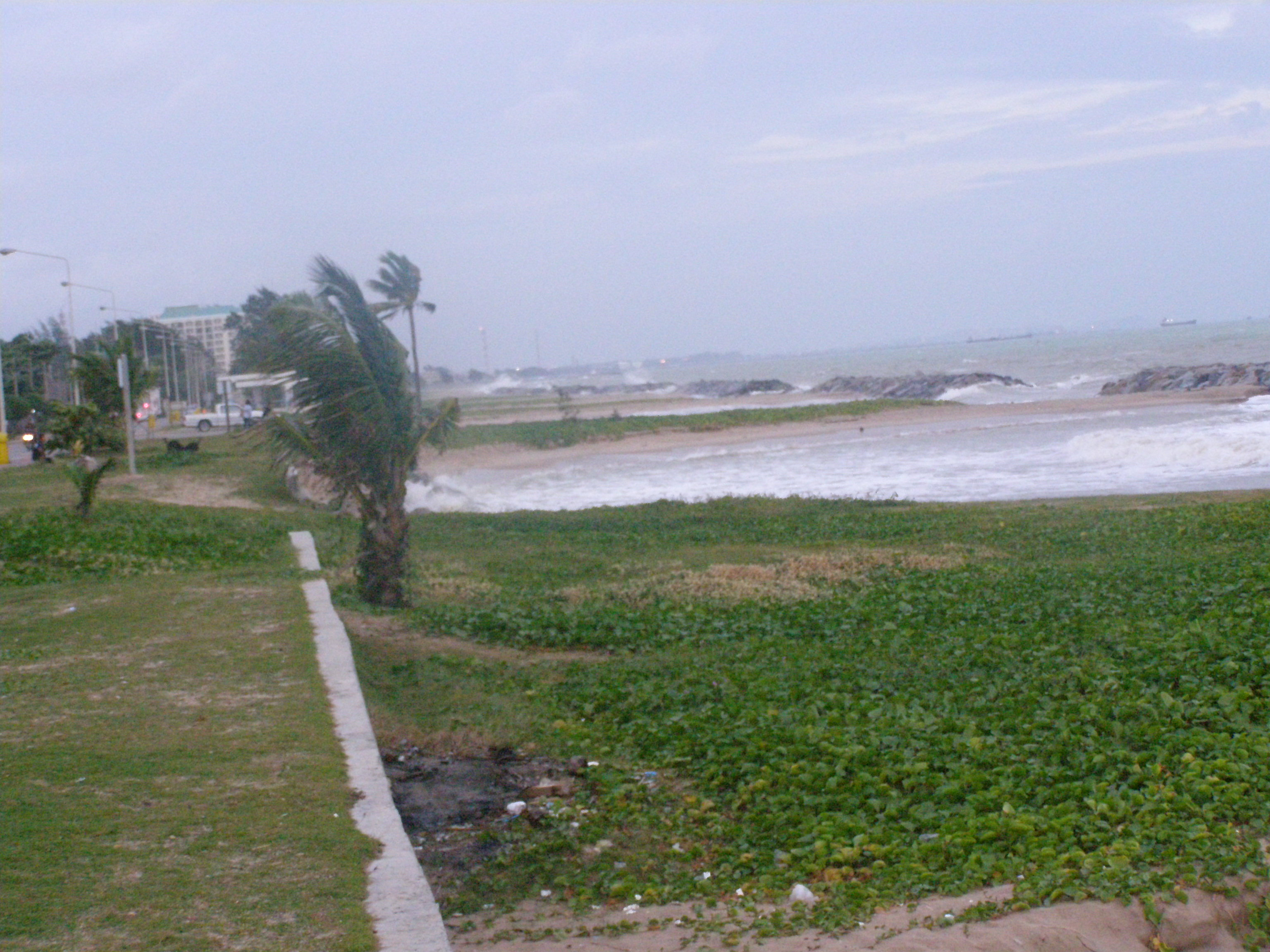
Saeng Chan Beach (3)

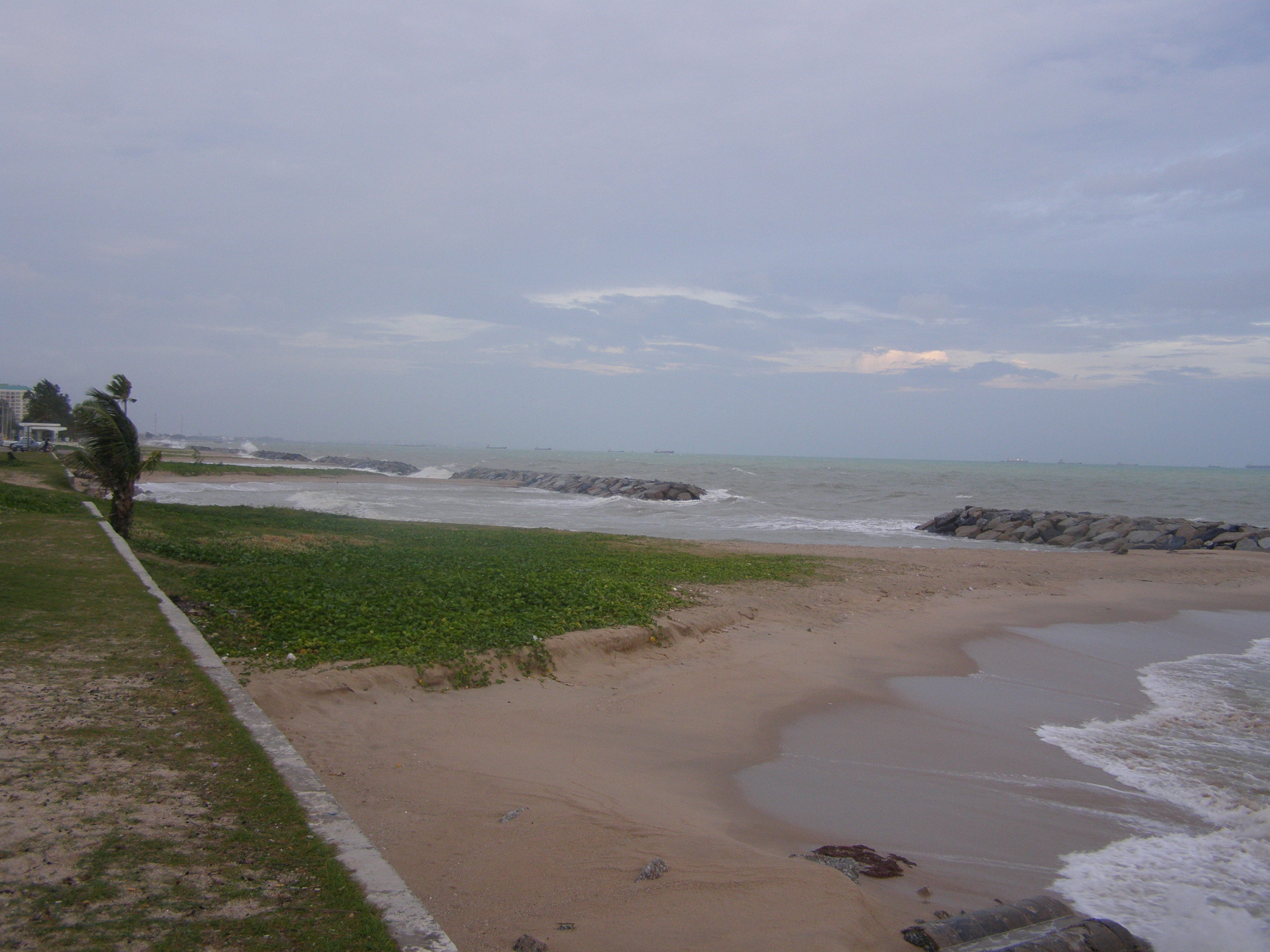
Saeng Chan Beach (4)

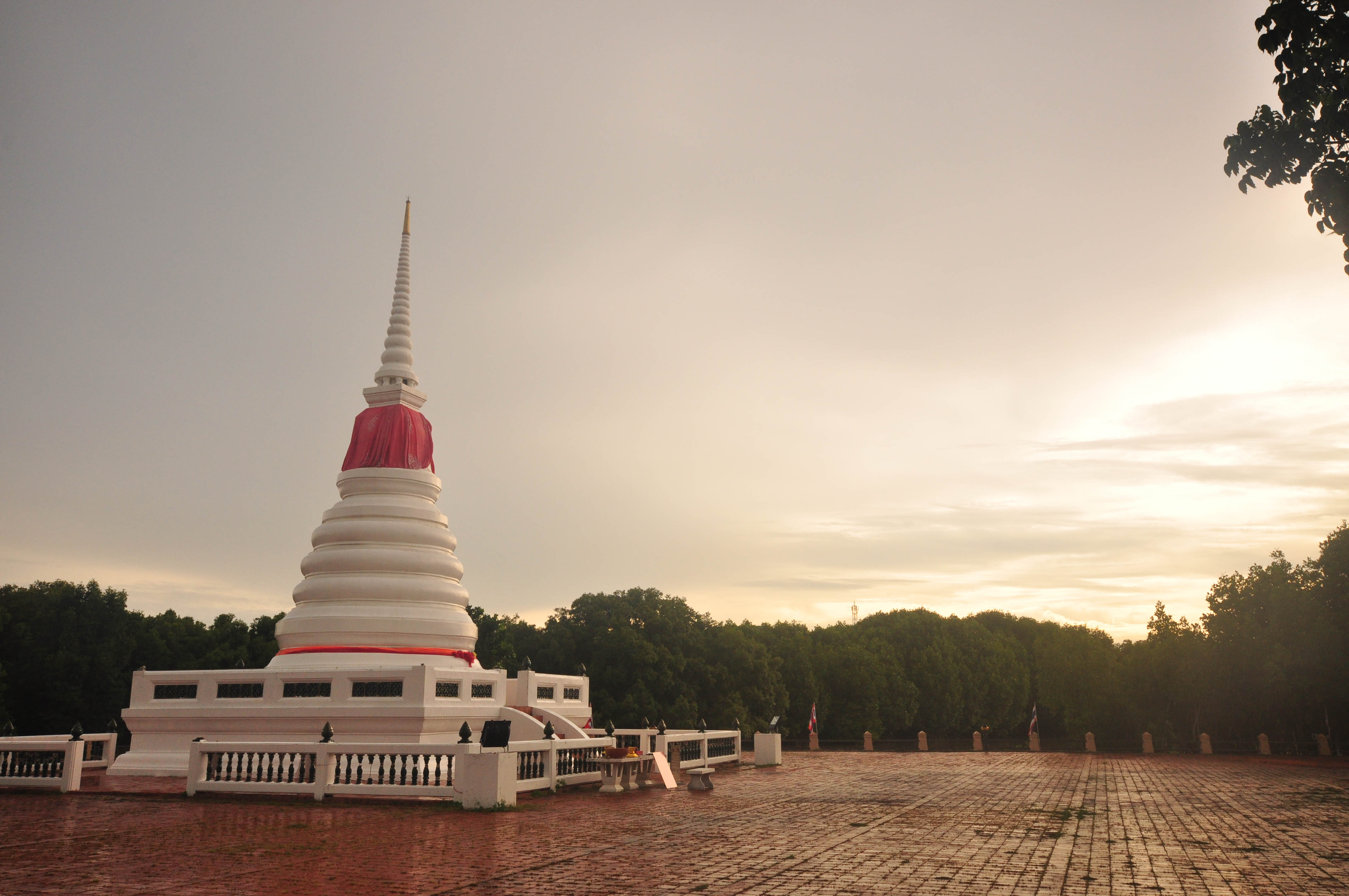
Phra Chedi Klang Nam (1)

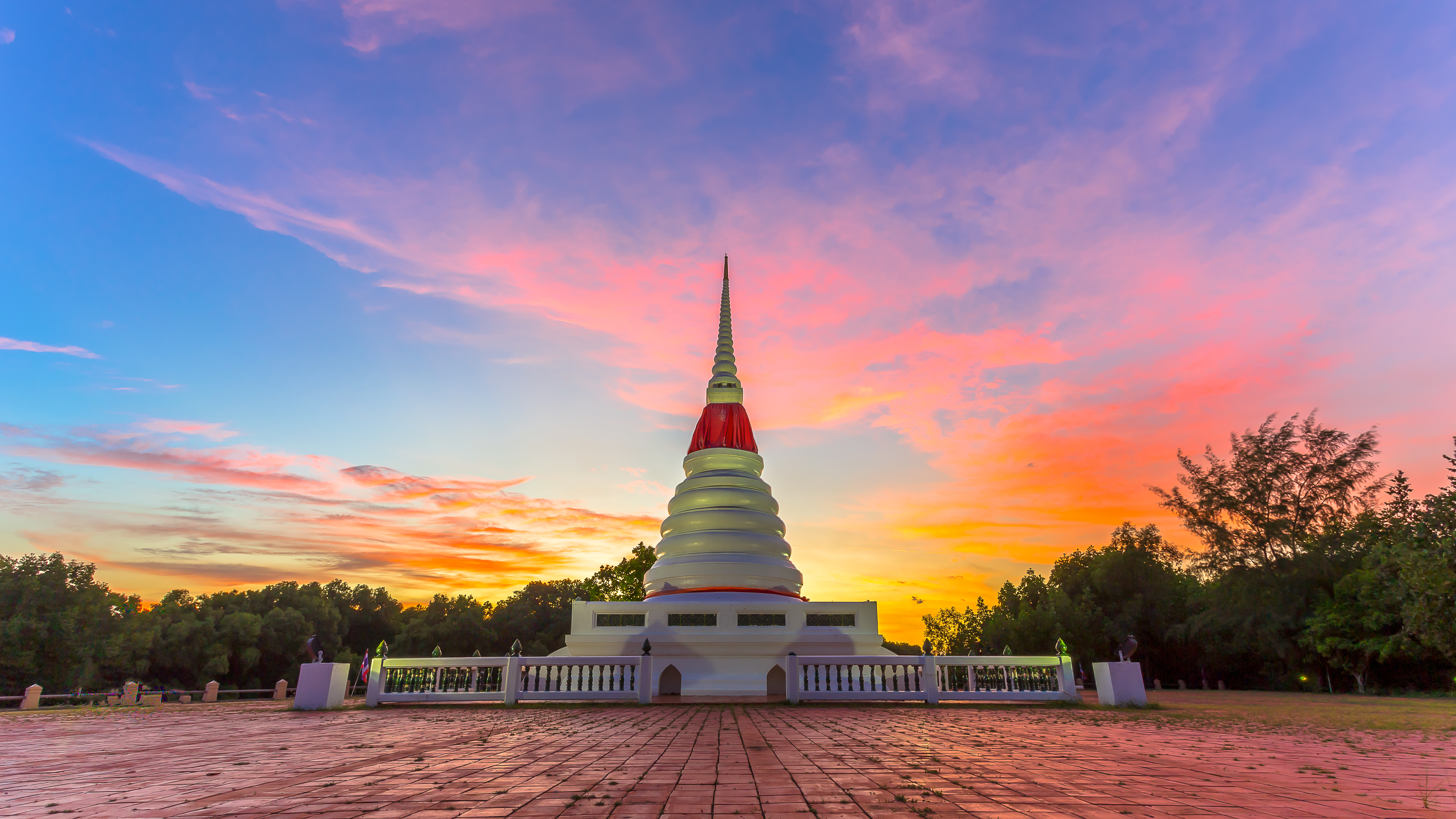
Phra Chedi Klang Nam (2)

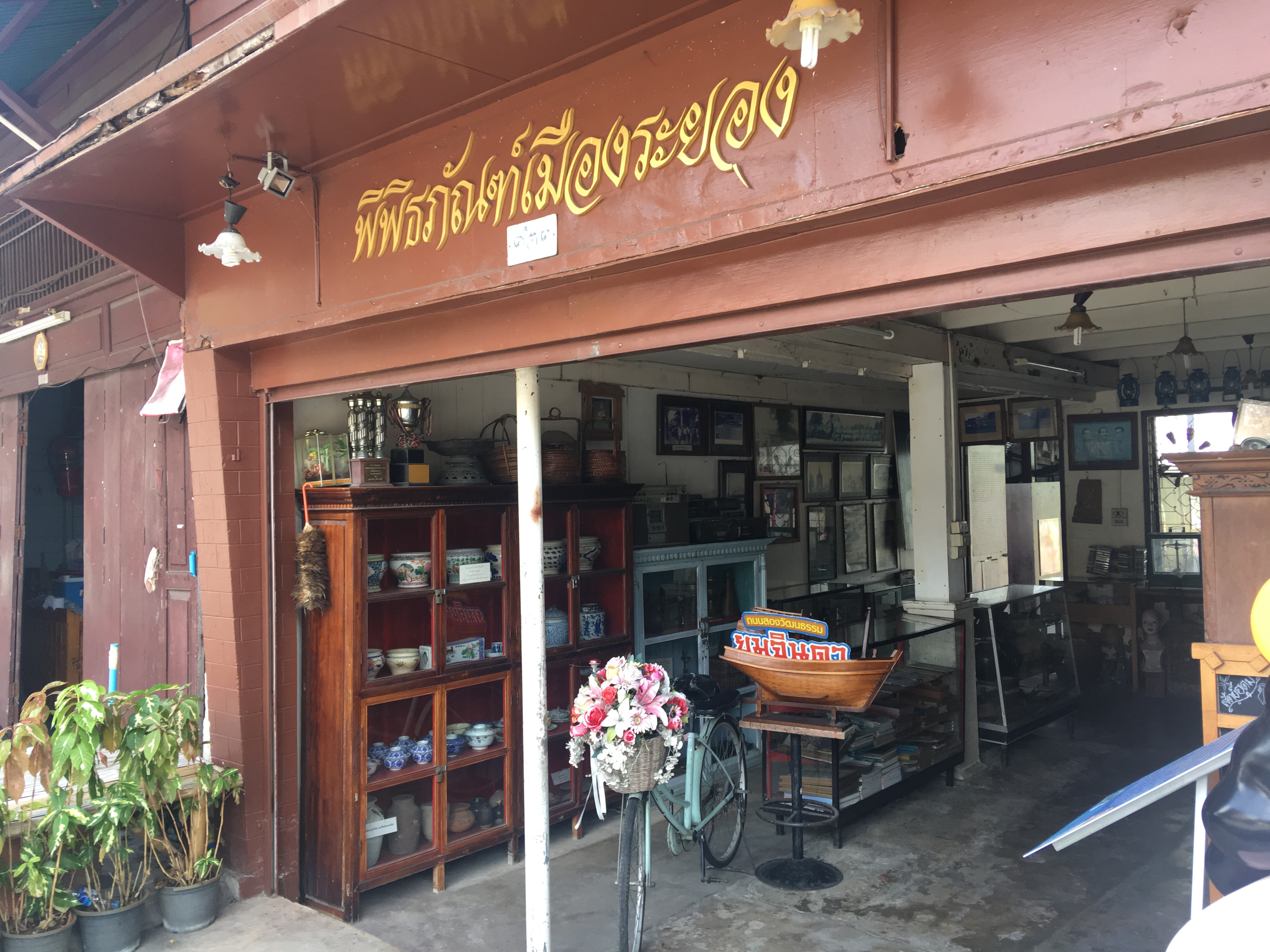
Rayong Museum

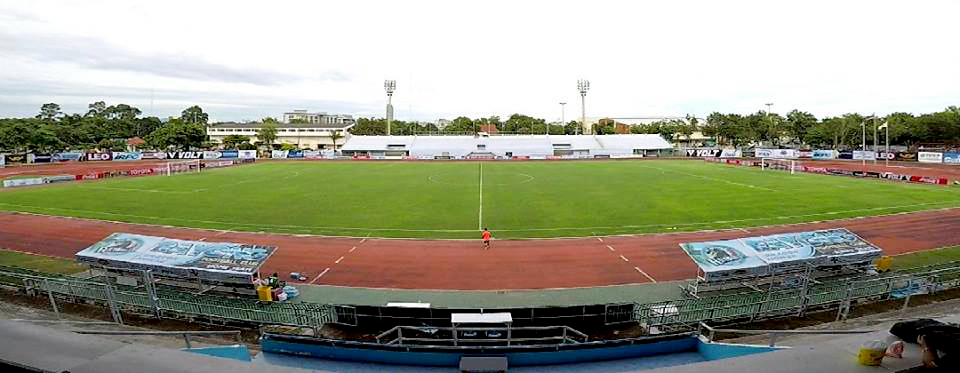
Rayong Province Stadium

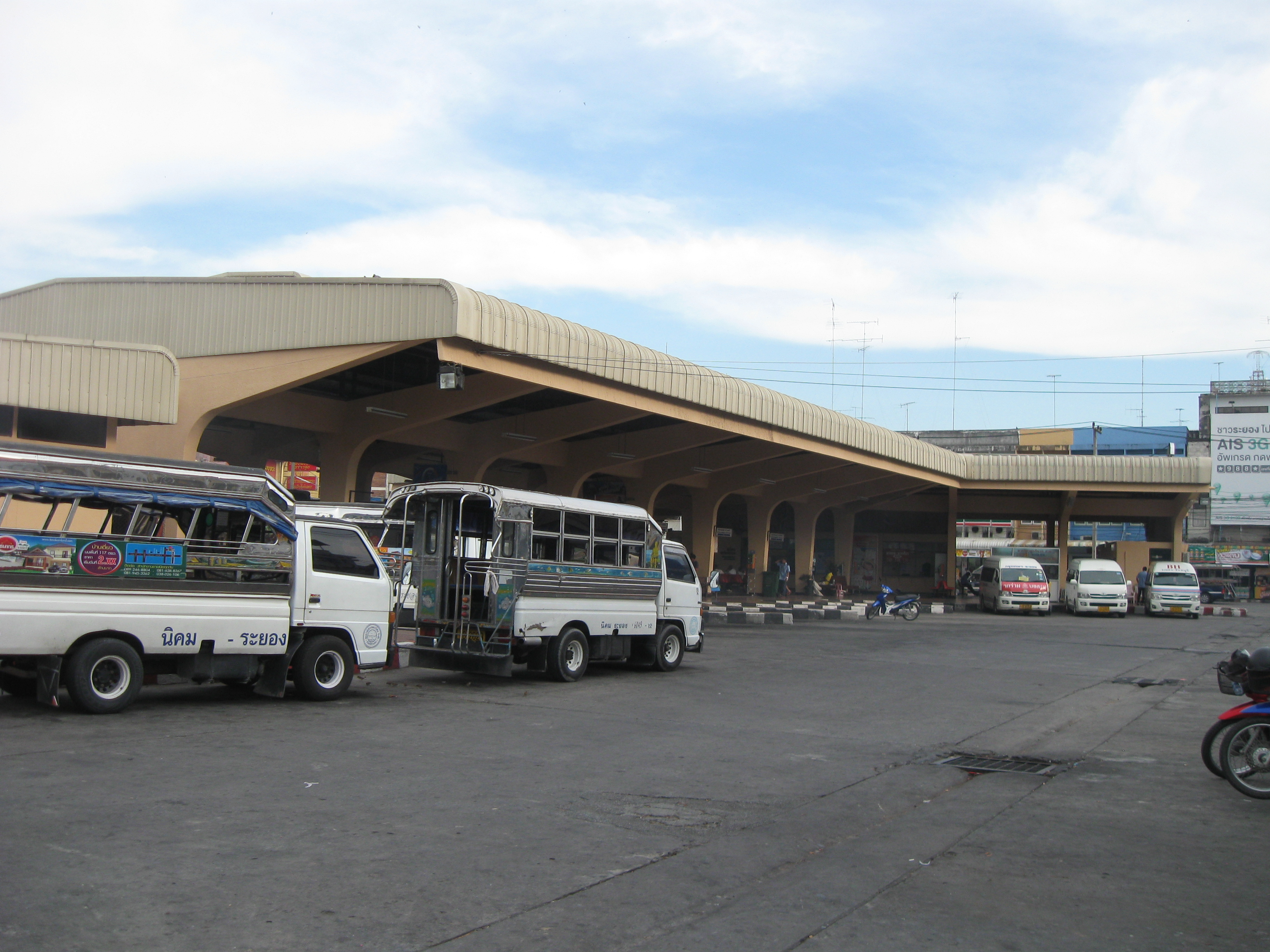
Rayong bus terminal

Saeng Thian Beach - Samed Island

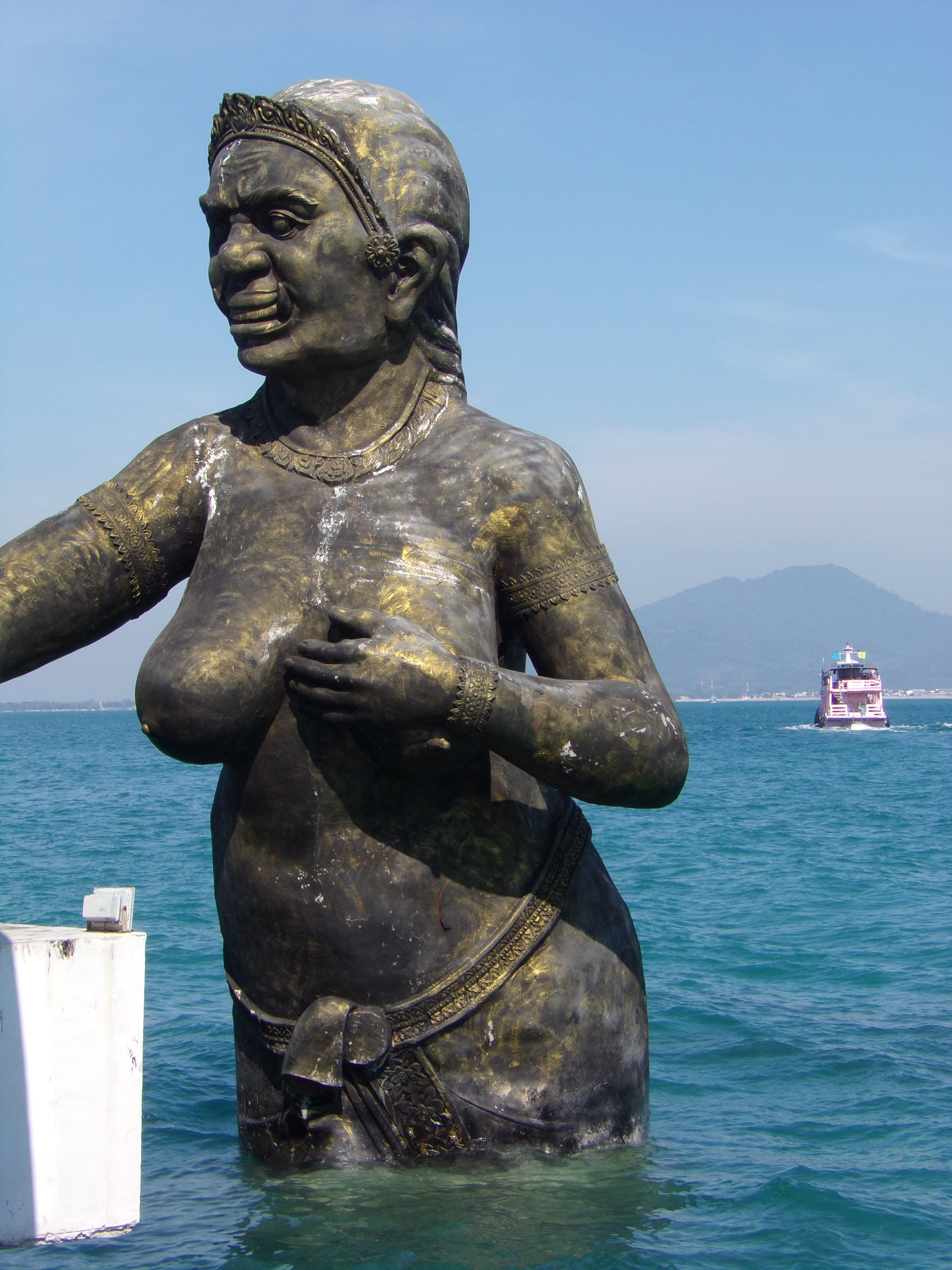
Nang Phisuea Samudra statue at Samed Island (1)

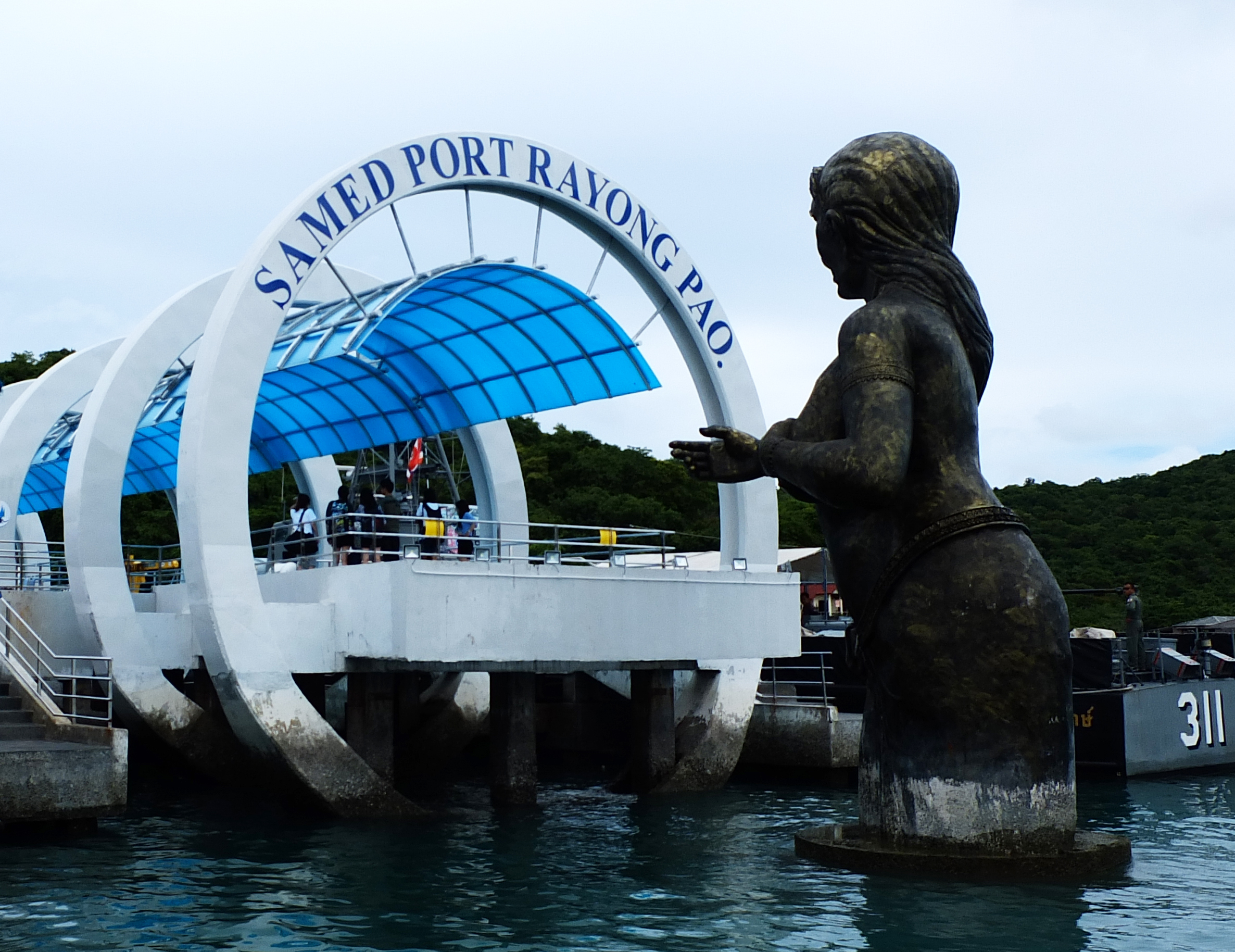
Sea Butterfly statue at Samed Island (2)

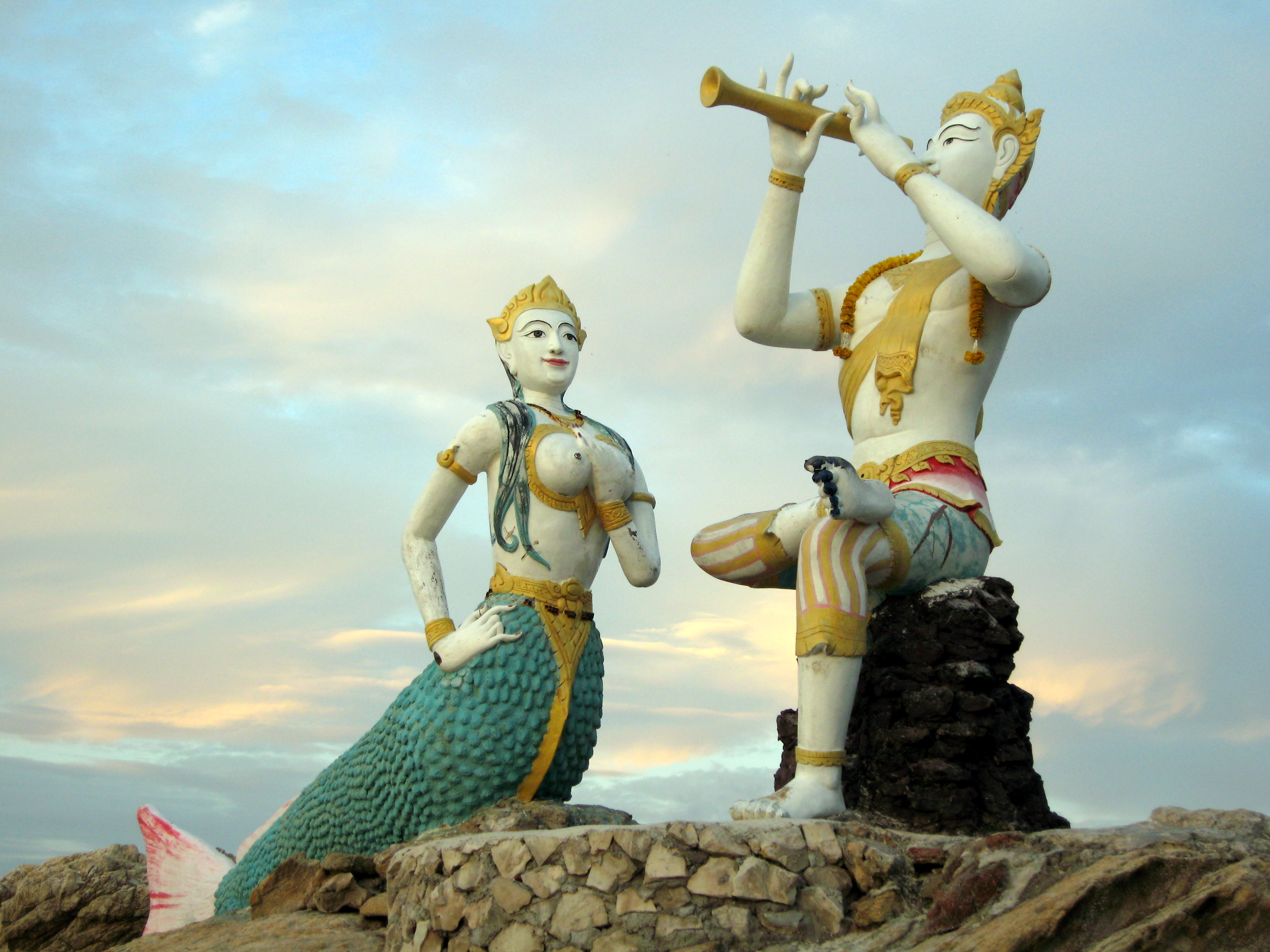
Hat Saikaew, Koh Samet

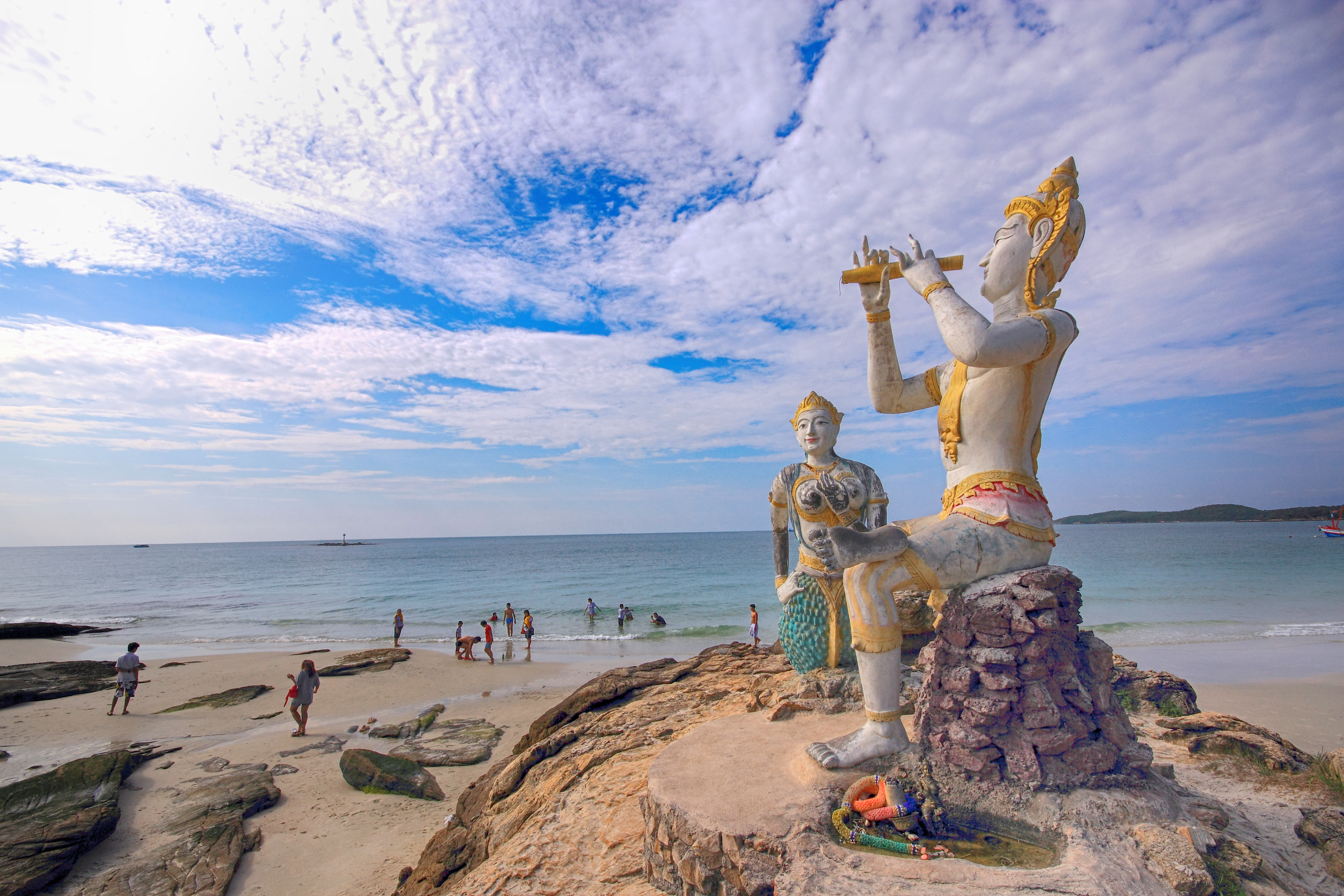
Khao Laem Yha - Samed Island (1)

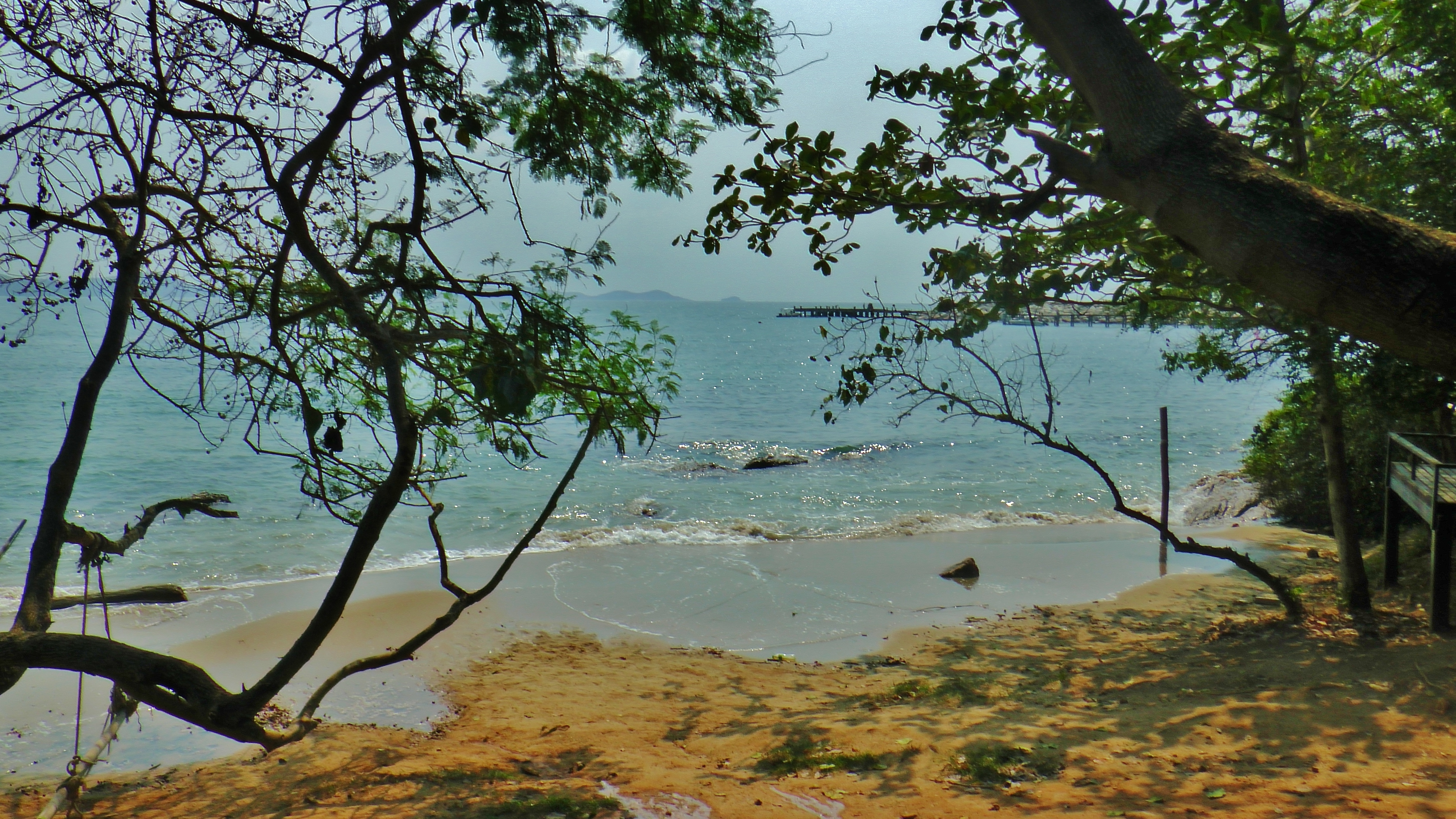
Khao Laem Yha - Samed Island (2)

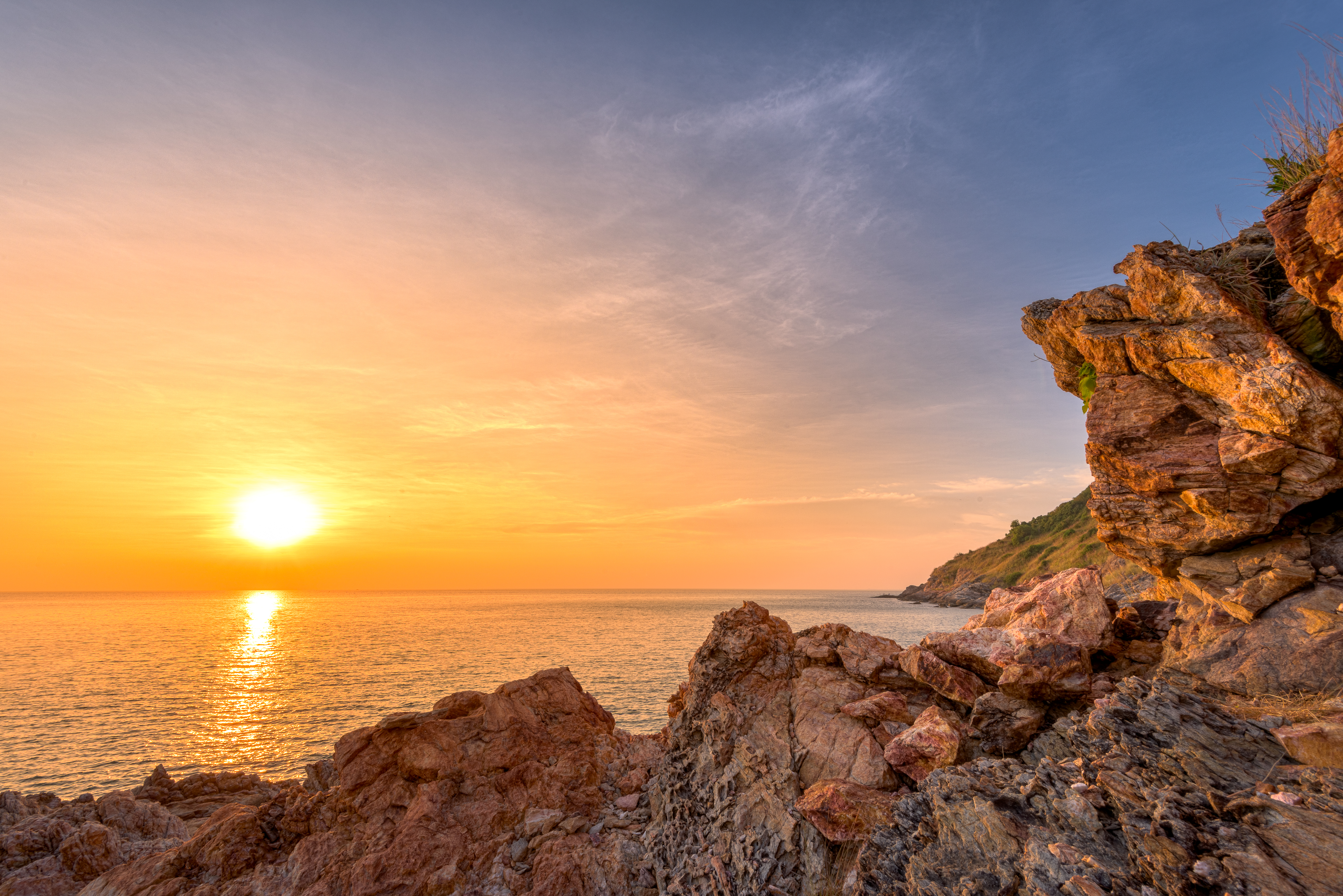
Khao Laem Yha - Samed Island (3)

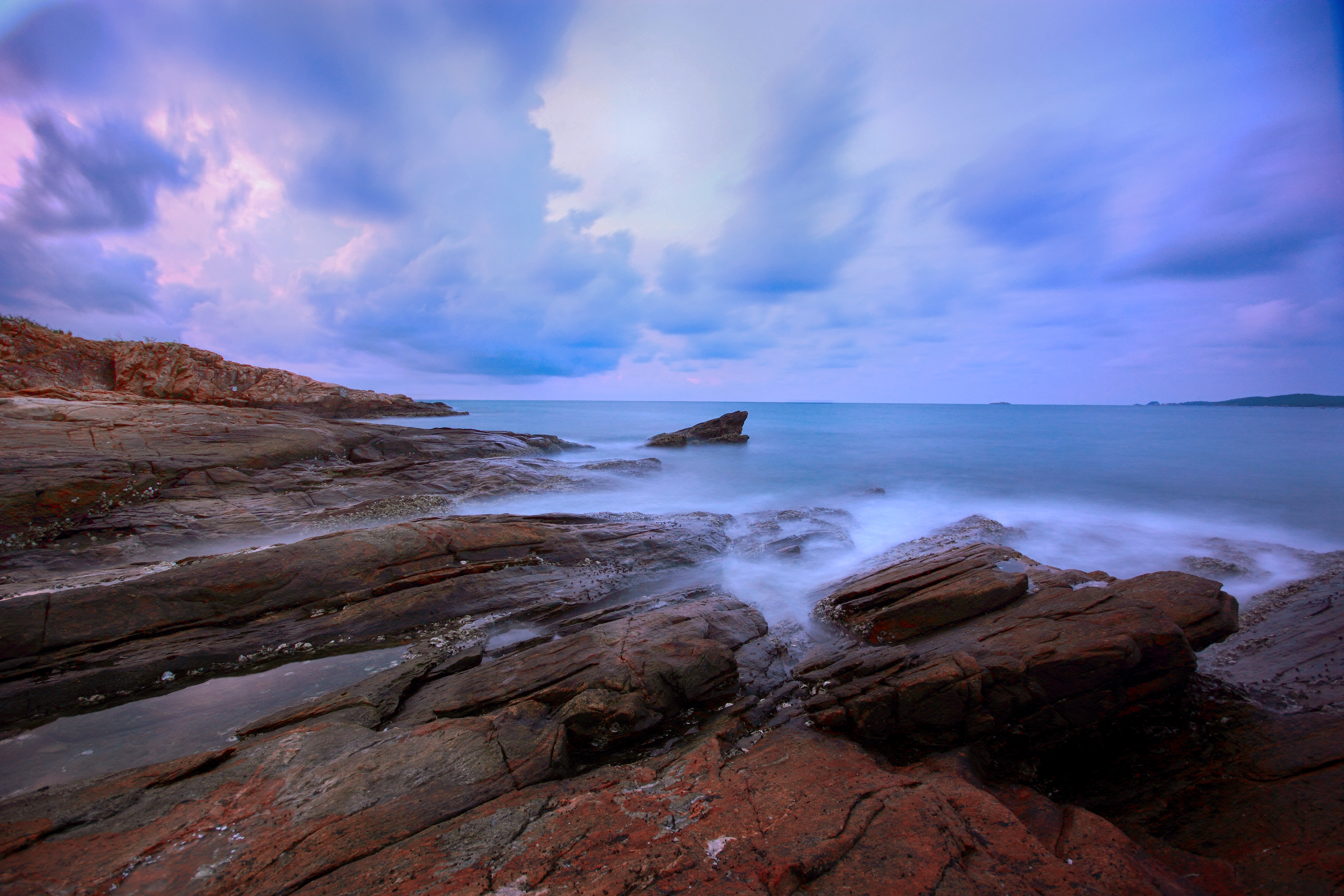
Khao Laem Yha - Samed Island (4)

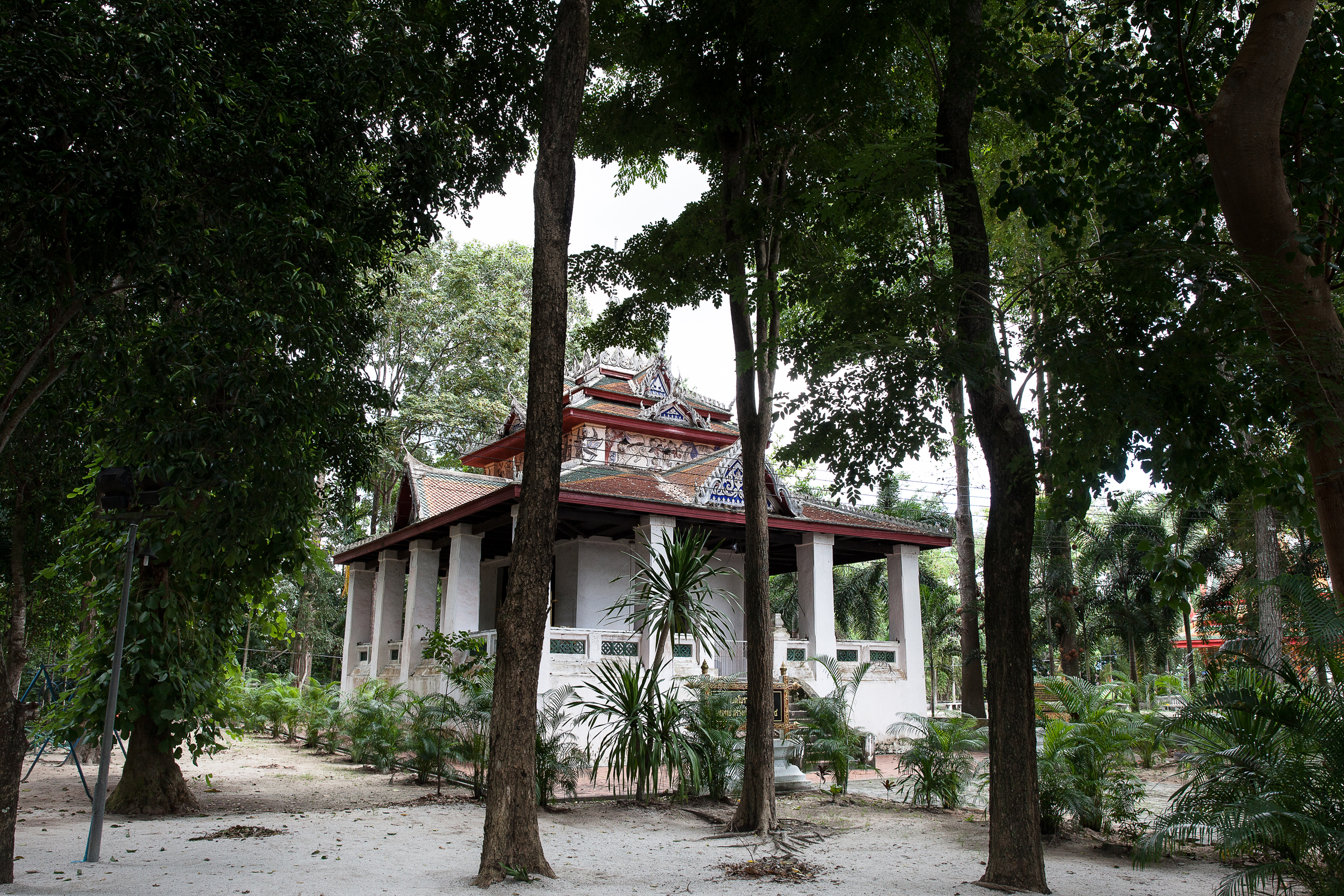
Wat Bankhai

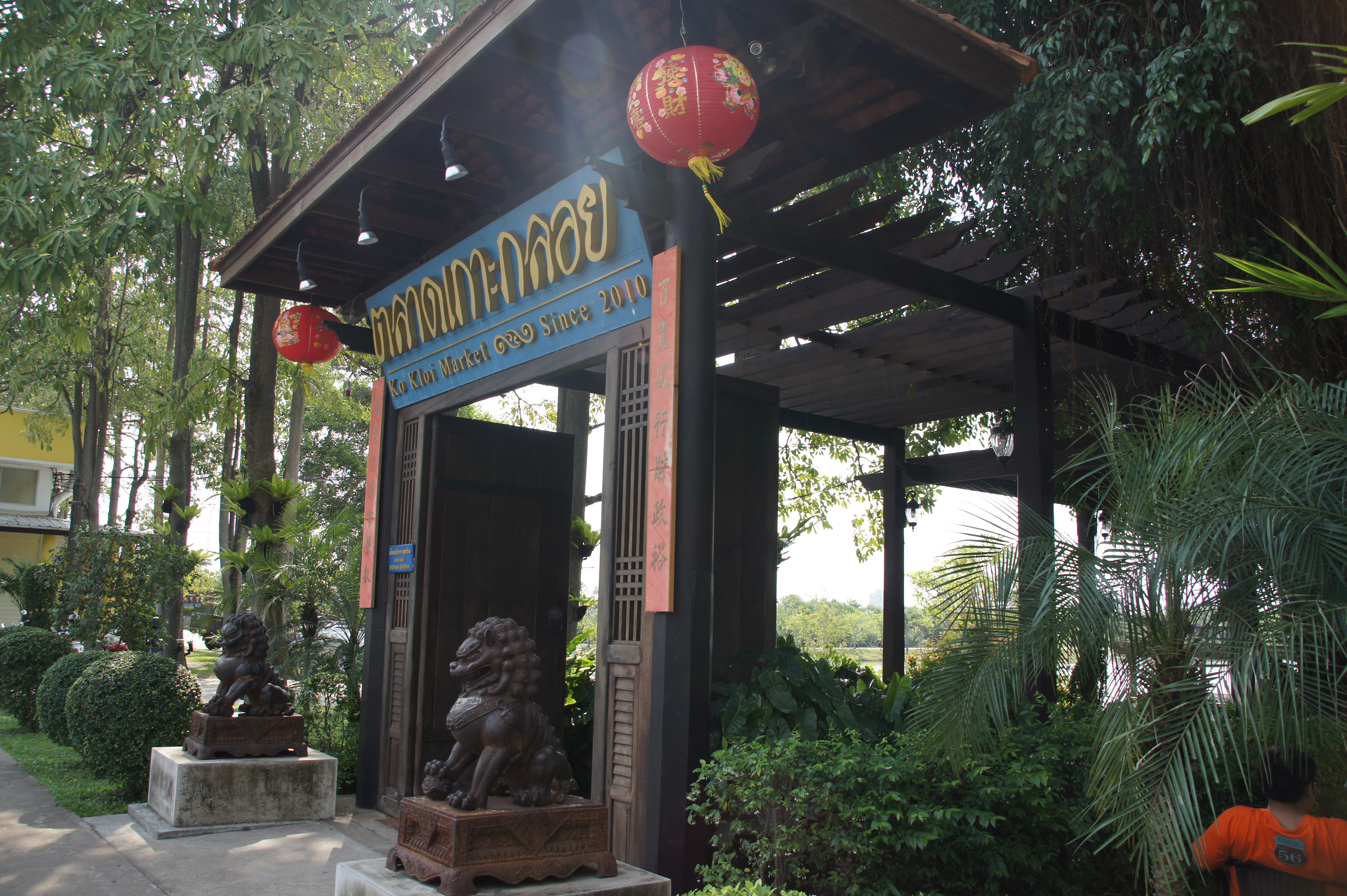
Ko Kloi Market

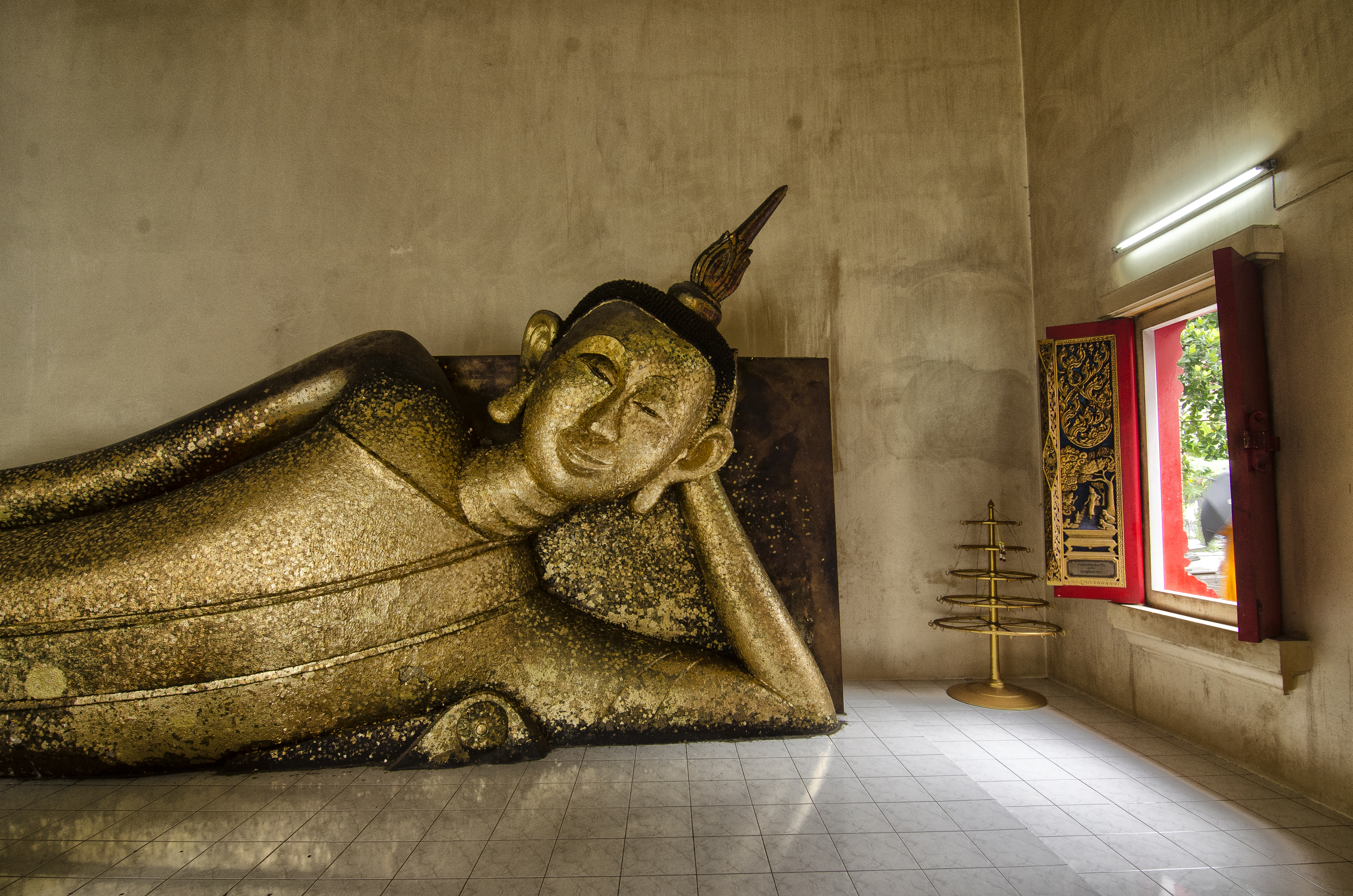
Wat Pa Pradoo

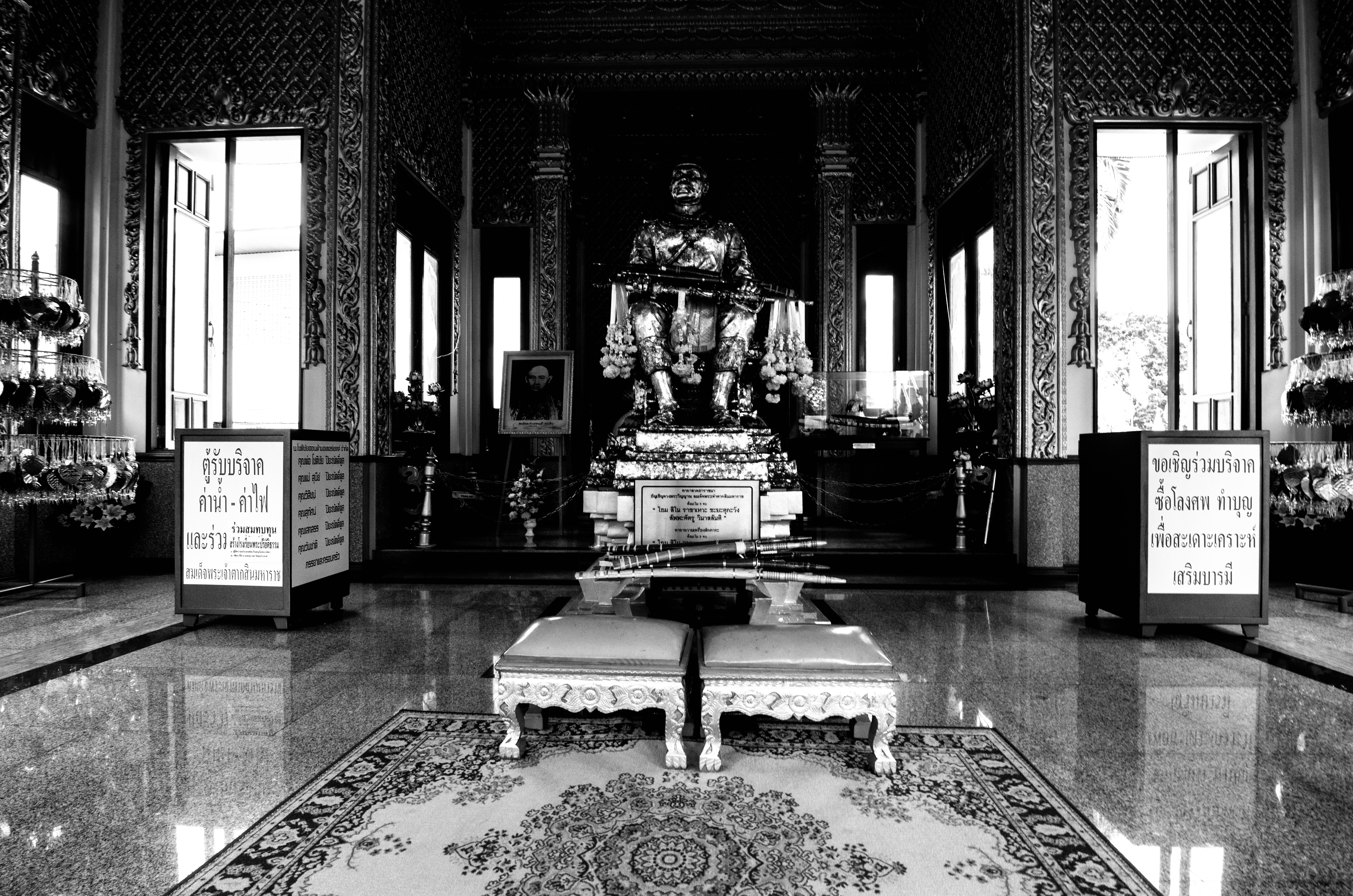
Wat Lum Mahachai Chumphon
