= Panthathala =

Panthathala Panthahtala
- village
- Location in Kerala, India Panthathala (India)
- Coordinates: 9°42′0″N 76°41′0″E
- Country: India
- State: Kerala
- District: Kottayam

Government
  - Body: Panchayath
  - Density: 390/km^{2} (1,000/sq mi)

Languages
  - Official: Malayalam, English
- Time zone: UTC+5:30 (IST)
- PIN: 686573
- Telephone code: 04822
- Vehicle registration: KL-35
- Nearest city: Palai
- Sex ratio: 1021 ♂/♀
- Literacy: 98%%
- Lok Sabha constituency: Kottayam
- Civic agency: Panchayath

Panthathala is a village in mutholy panchayath, close to Palai in the Kottayam district of Kerala state in India. The river Meenachil flows by on one side of the village. Panthathala's primary product is rubber and most of its inhabitants are farmers. The main religion is Roman Catholics and Hindu. Famous temple include Malayil Kavu Devi, and shrine is St.thomas kurisupally. St. Antoney's and St Joseph's are the main high schools. Nearby towns are Mevada, Mutholy Kadavu, and Velliappally. It is also the birthplace of many great people.

Panthathala consists of 9 and 10th wards of Mutholy Panchayath. It falls under Pala assembly constituency and Kottayam Parliament constituency. Mostly Christians and Hindus live here in harmony. Panthathala toddy shop was famous in 1980s and 90s when Predegree courses were norm.
