= Phra Chedi Klang Nam =

Coordinates: 12.6661°N 101.2418°E

Phra Chedi Klang Nam is a chedi in Rayong Province. Phra Chedi Klang Nam was built approximately 2 kilometers away from Rayong and is located in the middle of the mouth of the Rayong River. Tourists can travel to Phra Chedi Klang Nam everyday from 6 a.m. to 5 p.m., at Tambon Pak Nam, Amphoe Muaeng, Rayong. The chedi was constructed in 1873 by Kate Yomjinda, who was the Rayong provincial administrator at the time. The feature of pagoda looks like large white bell which stands 10 meters high and the ground is reddish-brown brick. Once the Chedi used to symbolise reaching Rayong for sailors. Now the people of Rayong esteem the Phra Chedi Klang Nam and it is a symbol of Rayong. The tourists should travel to Phra Chedi Klang Nam during the twelfth lunar month because at that time the annual celebration takes place. In November during the Loy Krathong festival, festival for paying respect to the Phra Mae Kong Ka, people can join the festival at Phra Chedi Klang Nam and there is Thai traditional boat racing as well. In mid-December every year, there is an offering robes to Buddhist monks and cover clothes for pagoda tradition. Two men cover the apex of pagoda by a 6 meter long red cloth. The area around Phra Chedi Klang Nam is covered by pine trees, so the weather is pretty good. People usually go there to relax and have a picnic.
