= Mutholy =

- semi village
- Location in Kerala, India Mutholy (India)
- Coordinates: 9°42′2.6″N 76°39′17.86″E
- Country: India
- State: Kerala
- District: Kottayam
- Established: 1953

Government
  - Type: Local self Government
  - Body: Grama Panchayath

Area
  - Total: 18.12 km^{2} (7.00 sq mi)

Population (2016)
  - Total: 15,267
  - Density: 896/km^{2} (2,320/sq mi)

Languages
  - Official: Malayalam,
- Time zone: UTC+5:30 (IST)
- Postal code: 686573
- Vehicle registration: KL 35

Mutholy is a village in Kottayam district of Kerala State in India on the west side of the city of Pala. Mutholy Gramapanchayath lies on both sides of the Meenachil River. Its nearly 5 km away from the town of Pala. Total area: 18.12 km^{2}. and population: 15267.

== See also ==
- Panthathala
- Pala, Kerala
