= Central–Western Economic Corridor =

Special economic corridor of Thailand

- Special Economic Zone
- Country: Thailand
- Region: Central, Western Thailand
- Provinces: 4 provinces: Phra Nakhon Si Ayutthaya; Nakhon Pathom; Suphanburi; Kanchanaburi

Government
  - Type: Special economic zone

Area
  - Total: 27,009 km^{2} (10,428 sq mi)

Population (2021)
  - Total: 3,378,685
- Time zone: UTC+7 (ICT)

The Central–Western Economic Corridor (Abrv: CWEC; Thai: ระเบียงเศรษฐกิจพิเศษภาคกลาง-ตะวันตก) is a special economic zone in Thailand that aims to promote economic development in the central and western regions of the country. It comprises four provinces: Phra Nakhon Si Ayutthaya, Nakhon Pathom, Suphanburi, and Kanchanaburi. The corridor is focused on developing the agro-tourism industry, high-value hi-tech industry, as well as green and heritage tourism. The CWEC is strategically designed to connect both to Bangkok and the Eastern Economic Corridor (EEC), as well as to the Dawei port in Myanmar, making it an important hub for transportation and trade.

== History ==
The National Committee for the Development of Special Economic Zones (SEZ) approved the Central-Western Economic Corridor (CWEC) as a special economic zone in May 2022, along with three other corridors. The CWEC covers the provinces of Phra Nakhon Si Ayutthaya, Nakhon Pathom, Suphanburi, and Kanchanaburi, and is designed to serve as a manufacturing base for agriculture, tourism, and high technology. On September 20, 2022, the cabinet acknowledged and approved the committee's proposals, which authorized the Finance Ministry's permanent secretary to chair a subcommittee to establish non-tax and tax investment incentives, one-stop services, infrastructure, and facilities to attract investors.

== Economic ==
The region is known for its diverse agricultural production, including rice, sugar cane, cassava, and livestock, and is also a hub for orchids exports. The extensive irrigation system in the region allows for the production of advanced processed agricultural products and bio-products, which creates opportunities for processing Myanmar's resources. The CWEC is also a production base for the automotive parts and electronics industries, which are connected to the Eastern Economic Corridor (EEC) area. The corridor also has a thriving tourism industry that offers visitors the chance to explore world heritage sites, natural attractions, and engage in various forms of adventure tourism.

== See also ==
- Eastern Economic Corridor (EEC)
- Northern Economic Corridor (NEC)
- Northeastern Economic Corridor (NEEC)
- Southern Economic Corridor (SEC)
- Special Economic Zones (SEZ)
