= Eastern Economic Corridor =

- Special Economic Zone
Eastern Special Development Zone
- Thai: เขตพัฒนาพิเศษภาคตะวันออก
- romanisation: Khēt Phathanā Phisēt Phāk Tawan-ǭk
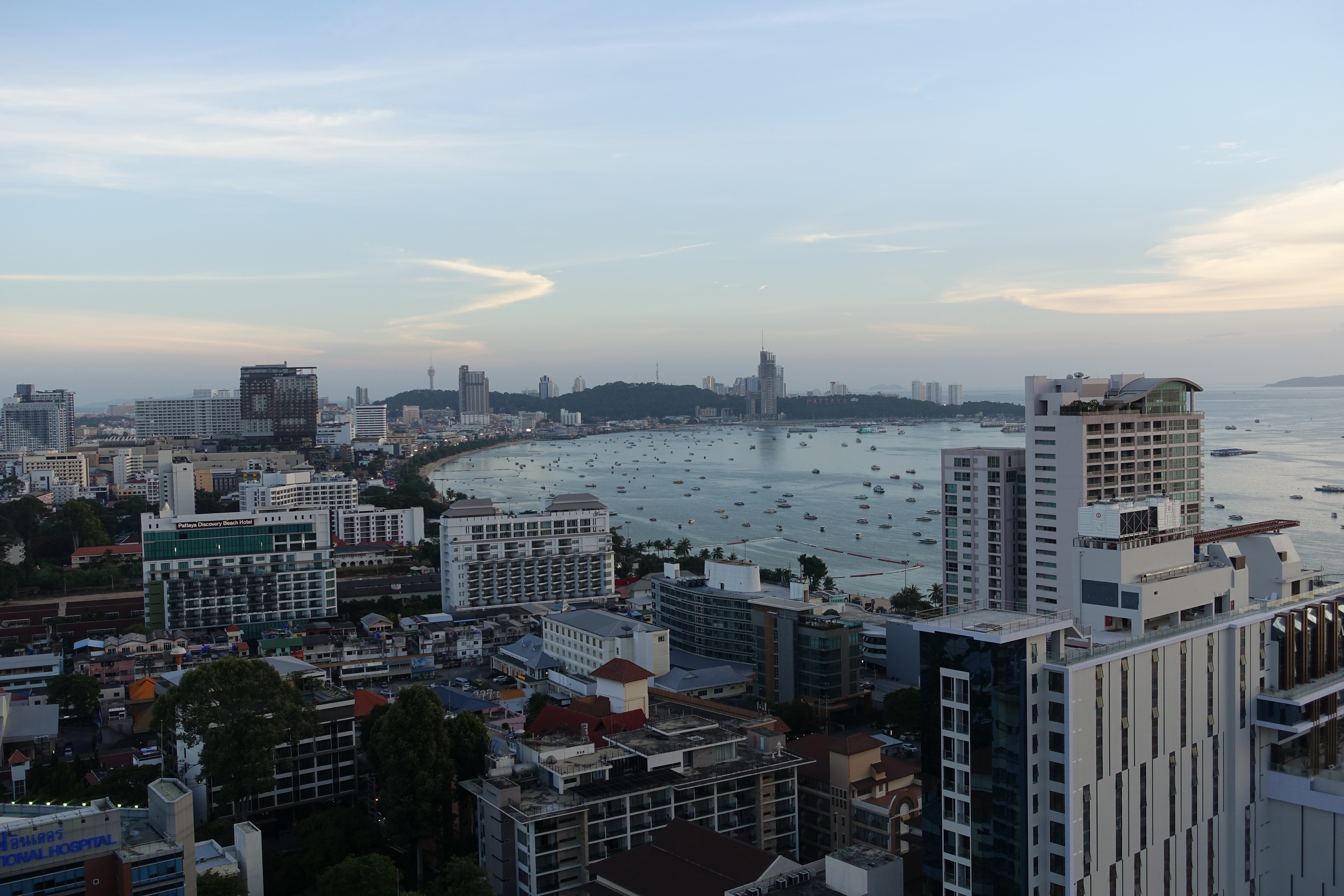
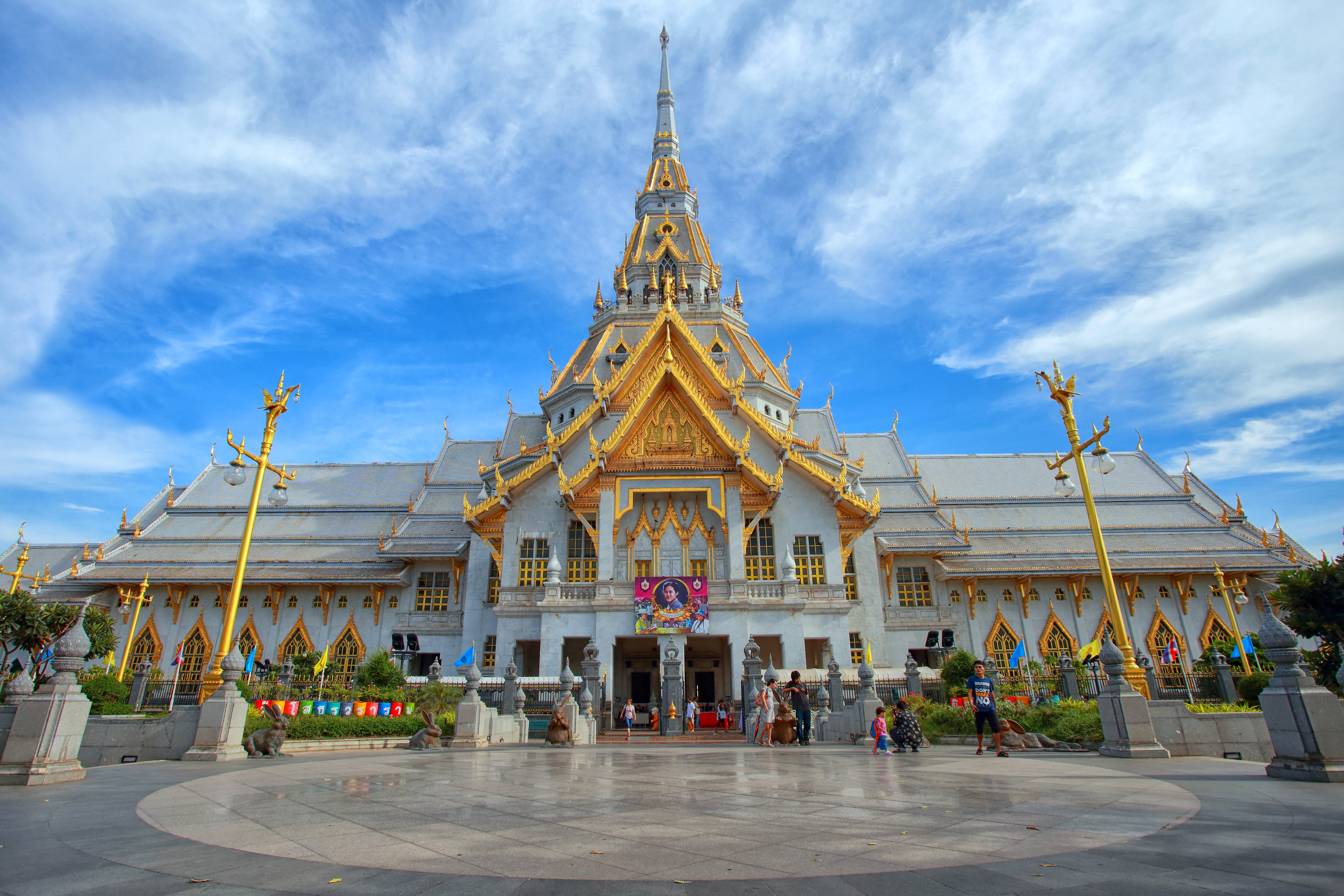
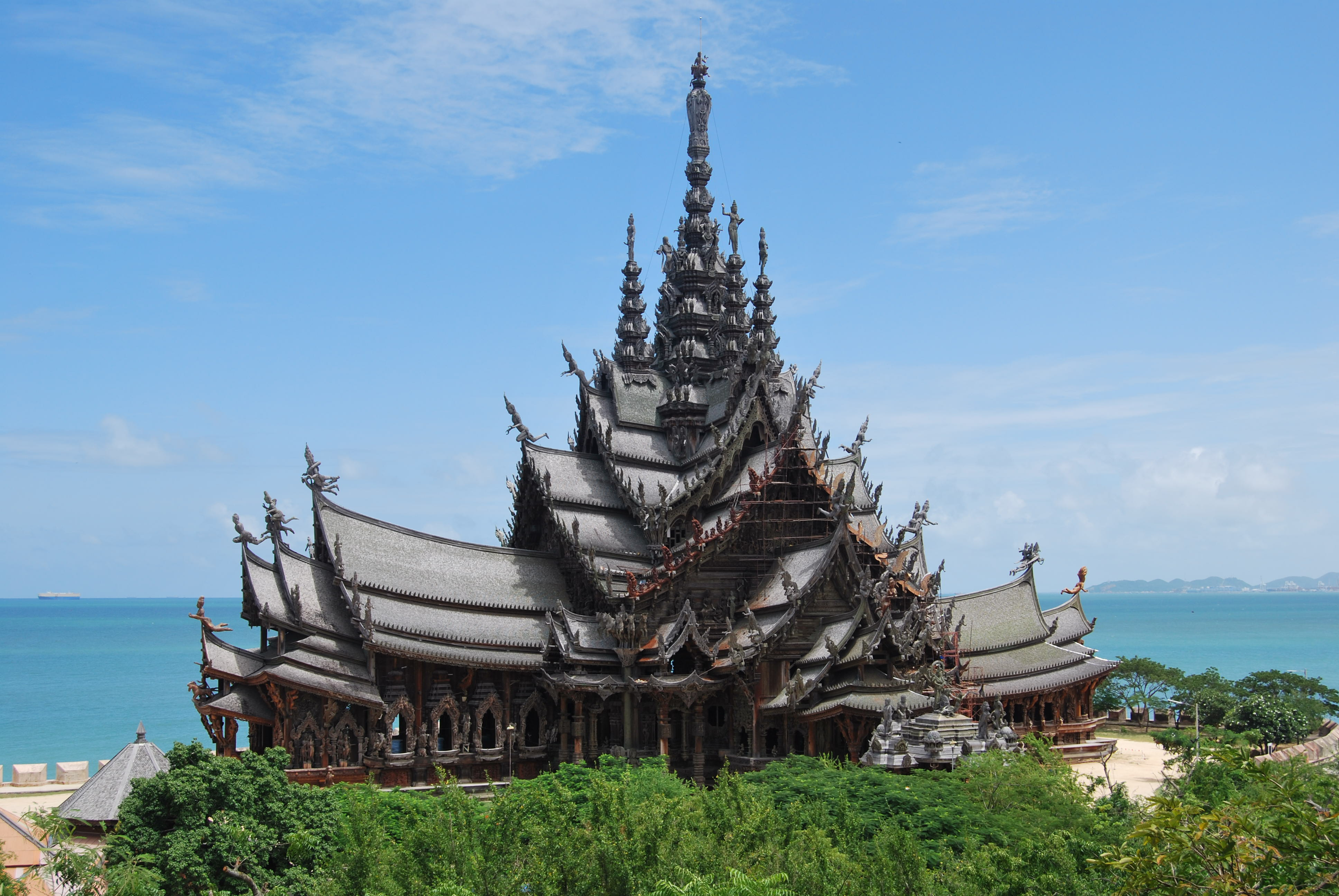
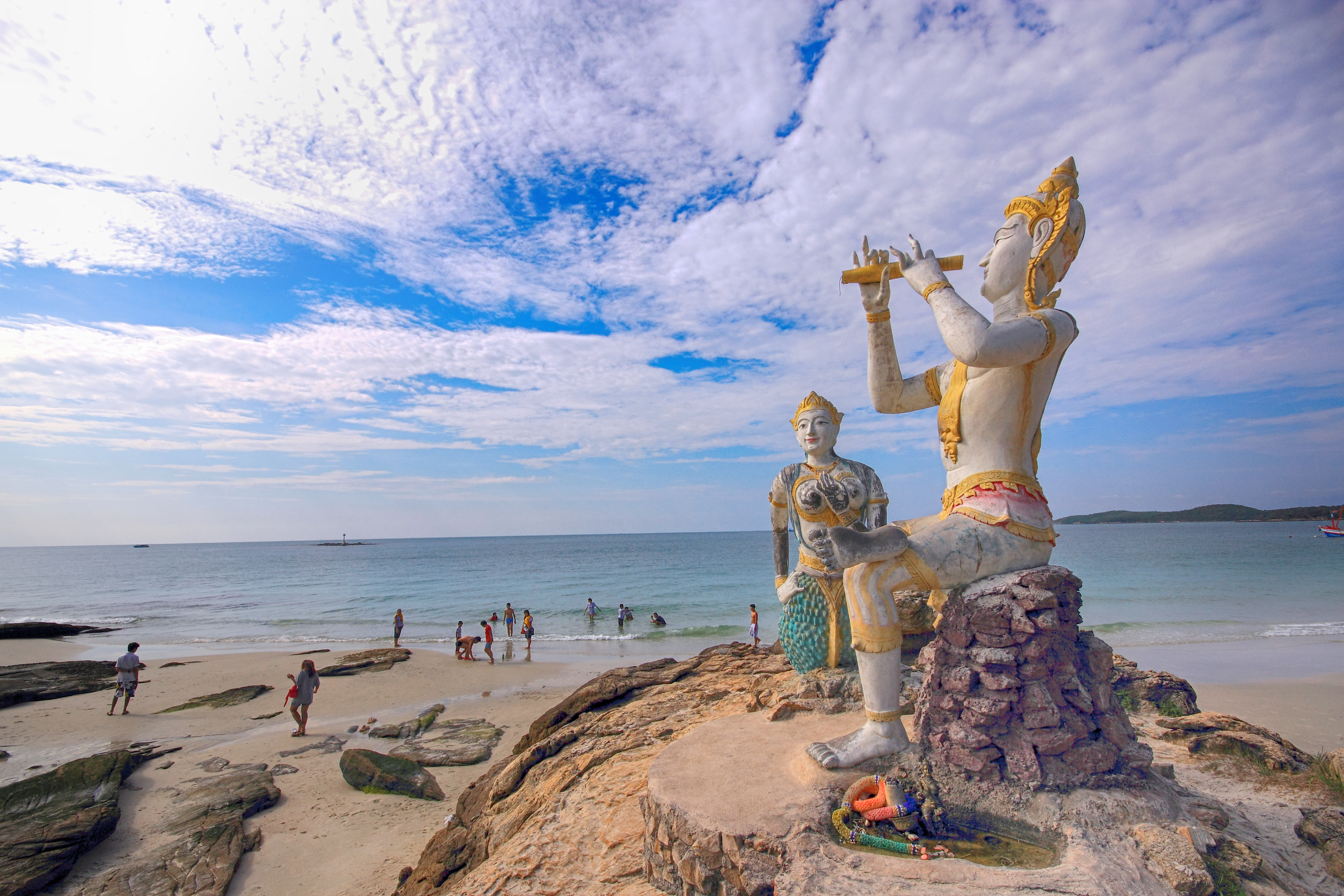
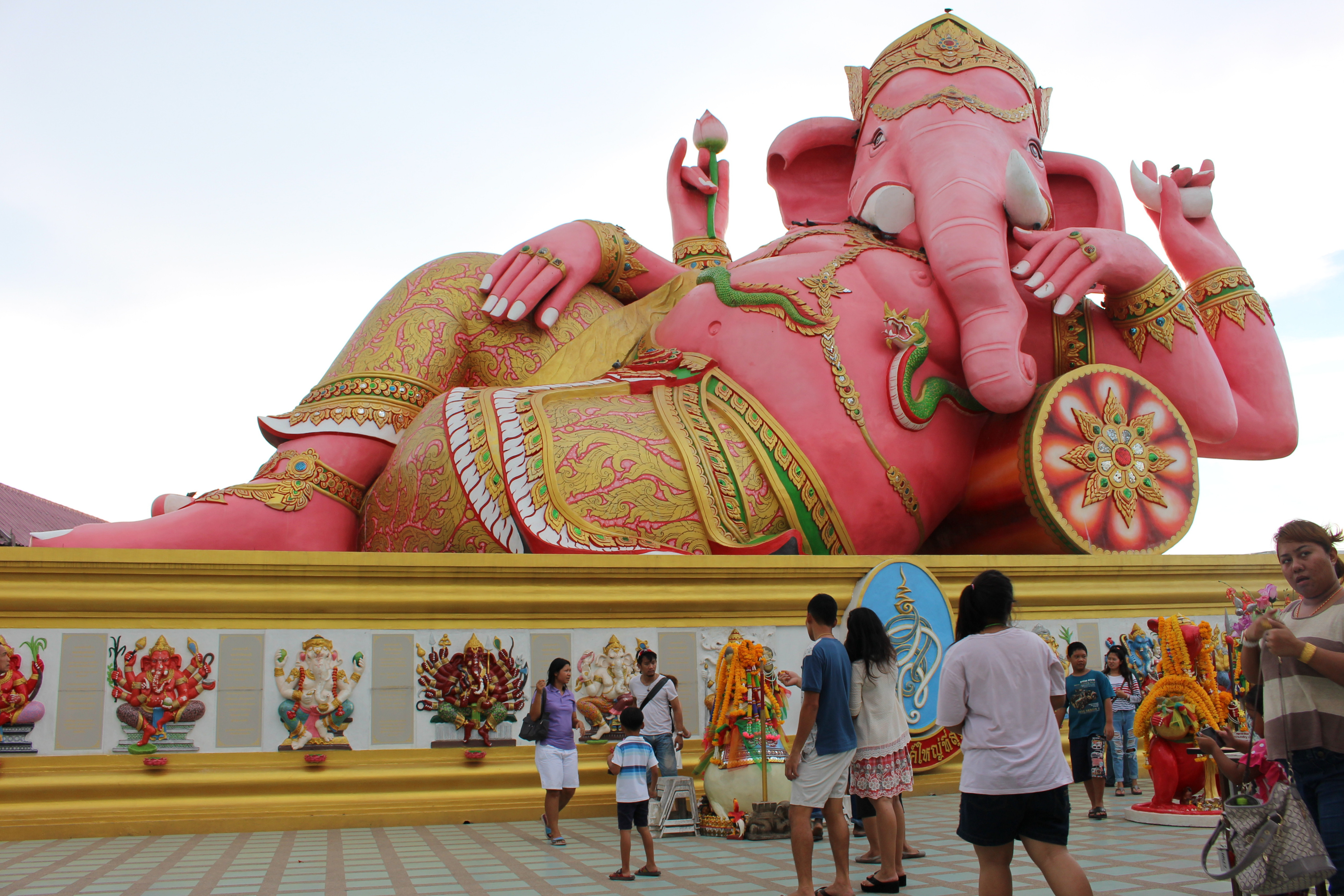
- (clockwise from upper left) View of Pattaya skyline, Wat Sothonwararam main hall, Sanctuary of Truth, Phra Abhimani and the mermaid of Ko Samet, and Ganesha of Wat Saman Rattanaram

- Emblem
- Motto: The Prime Gateway to Asia
- Country: Thailand
- Region: Eastern Thailand
- Provinces: 3 provinces: Chachoengsao; Chonburi; Rayong; Bangkok (peripheral); Samut Prakan (peripheral)
- Largest city by population: Si Racha
- Before establishment: Eastern seaboard
- NCPO head order: 17 January 2017
- ESDZ act: 15 May 2018
- Governing body: Eastern Special Development Zone Policy Office

Government
  - Type: Special economic zone
  - Secretariat: Chula Sukmanop

Area
  - Total: 13,266 km^{2} (5,122 sq mi)

Population (2018)
  - Total: 2,973,770
  - Density: 224.16/km^{2} (580.58/sq mi)
- Time zone: UTC+7 (ICT)
- Website: www.eeco.or.th

The Eastern Economic Corridor (Abrv: EEC; Thai: ระเบียงเศรษฐกิจภาคตะวันออก, romanized: Rabīang Sētthakit Phāk Tawan-ǭk, RTGS: Rabiang Setthakit Phak Tawan-ok, pronounced [rā.bīa̯ŋ sèːt.tʰā.kìt pʰâːk tā.wān.ʔɔ̀ːk]) officially the Eastern Special Development Zone (ESDZ), is a special economic zone of three provinces in eastern Thailand. Collectively, these provinces occupy an area of 13,266 km^{2} (5,122 sq mi), and in 2016 had an estimated population of over 2.8 million.

The zone was established on 17 January 2017, at the direction of the National Council for Peace and Order (NCPO), with the mission of promoting economic integration across the Eastern seaboard. The first law of the EEC is the Eastern Special Development Zone Act, proclaimed on 15 May 2019.

== History ==
The Eastern Seaboard Development Programme (ESDP) was initiated as part of the Fifth Economic and Social Development Plan of Thailand (1982–1986). It aimed at developing the region of the eastern seaboard in order to promote industrial growth and to decentralize economic and population growth. The Thai government approached the World Bank for funding, but was turned away as, in the eyes of the bank, the project lacked "economic rationality". Japan rescued the project by providing a modest 178.8 billion yen (US$1.6 billion) in loans, underwriting the construction of 16 projects: ports, roads, waterworks, and industrial parks. Japanese companies then invested heavily in the region. As of 2020, many of the estimated 5,500 Japanese companies in Thailand have facilities in the area.

After the 2014 coup, the NCPO announced the creation of a special economic zone (SEZ) called the Eastern Economic Corridor (EEC) with a budget of 1.5 trillion baht (US$43 billion) over its first five years. It is a key component of the "Thailand 4.0" economic policy announced in 2016. As of 2017, the prime minister had invoked the special powers of Section 44 of the interim charter to revoke city plans in three provinces to remove obstacles to EEC development. Planners see the region as strategically important as it borders the gulf as well as being close to Bangkok, and two major airports.

In December 2022, the Thai government approved a 1.35 trillion baht ($44 billion) plan to develop the Eastern Economic Corridor (EEC) into a regional financial hub and a world-class smart city by 2037. The project will be divided into three phases, with the business and financial hub being constructed by 2025 and developed into one of the world's top 10 smart cities by 2037. The government estimates that the smart city will accommodate 350,000 people and create at least 200,000 jobs by 2032. 87.5% of the budget will come from the private sector, 2.8% from the government, and 9.7% from state enterprises or public-private partnerships. The project is expected to boost Thailand's GDP by 2 trillion baht over 10 years. Leased land and property in the EEC business hub and smart city will be transferred back to the government in 50 years.

== Administrative divisions ==
The economic zone includes three principal provinces and two peripheral provinces.

Member provinces
Seal	Flag	Province	Capital	Largest city	Accession	Population (2018)	Area	Population density
Seal of Chachoengsao	Flag of Chachoengsao province	Chachoengsao	Chachoengsao		17 January 2017	715,009	5,351 km^{2} (2,066 sq mi)	134/km^{2} (350/sq mi)
Seal of Chonburi	Flag of Chonburi province	Chonburi	Chonburi	Si Racha	17 January 2017	1,535,445	4,363 km^{2} (1,685 sq mi)	352/km^{2} (910/sq mi)
Seal of Rayong	Flag of Rayong province	Rayong	Rayong	Map Ta Phut	17 January 2017	723,361	1,568.737 km^{2} (605.693 sq mi)	461/km^{2} (1,190/sq mi)
Seal of Bangkok	Flag of Bangkok	Bangkok			Associated Area	10,820,921	1,004 km^{2} (388 sq mi)	10,778/km^{2} (27,910/sq mi)
Seal of Samut Prakan	Flag of Samut Prakan province	Samut Prakan	Samut Prakan	Bang Pu	Associated Area	1,326,608	1,004 km^{2} (388 sq mi)	1,321/km^{2} (3,420/sq mi)

== Governing body ==
The Eastern Special Development Zone Policy Office (ESDZPO) is the governing body of the Eastern Economic Corridor. It is an independent public agency, reporting directly to the prime minister. It was established on 15 May 2019 by the Eastern Special Development Zone (2018) Act and replaced the Eastern Economic Corridor Office.

=== EEC Secretariat ===
The EEC Secretariat is headed by the Secretary-General of the Eastern Special Development Zone Policy Office.

Secretaries-General
No.	Name	Took office	Left office	Notes
1	Kanit Sangsubhan	17 January 2017	17 August 2022	
2	Chula Sukmanop	1 April 2023	–	

== Economy ==
The EEC had a 2013 GDP of US$158.79bn (on a purchasing power parity basis), and US$63.76bn (on a nominal basis), about 15% of Thailand's GDP.

Alibaba is among the most prominent investors in the EEC. Alibaba committed approximately US$320 million for the development of an e-commerce digital hub in the EEC.

=== Industries ===
Twelve Key Industries Identified as Potential Growth Engines for Thailand:

Five S-curve industries: Next-generation automotive, intelligent electronics, advanced agriculture and biotechnology, food for the future, and high-value and medical tourism.

Seven new S-curve and supporting/emerging industries: Automation and robotics, aviation and logistics, medical and comprehensive healthcare, biofuel and biochemical, digital, defense, and education and human resource development.

=== Promotional zones ===
The EEC Policy Committee approved promotional zones in two categories:

- Special Services Promotional Zones : Implementation of infrastructure and technological development
- Industrial Promotional Zone : To better facilitate the development of 12 targeted industries

==== Special services ====
Zone	Type	Governing agency	Status	Area	Location	Province	Ref
EECa	Aerotropolis	Royal Thai Navy	Declared	10.4 km^{2} (4.0 sq mi)	U-Tapao International Airport	Chonburi, and Rayong	
EECd	Space krenovapolis	Ministry of Digital Economy and Society	Declared	1.28 km^{2} (0.49 sq mi)	Digital Park	Chonburi	
EECh	High-speed rail	State Railway of Thailand	Declared	1.3712 km^{2} (0.5294 sq mi)	Eastern high-speed railway	Bangkok, Samut Prakan, Chachoengsao, Chonburi, and Rayong	
EECi	Aripolis, and Biopolis	National Science and Technology Development Agency	Declared	5.6 km^{2} (2.2 sq mi)	Wang Chan Valley	Rayong	
EECmd	Comprehensive healthcare	Thammasat University	Declared	0.4256 km^{2} (0.1643 sq mi)	Thammasat University Pattaya	Chonburi	
EECgenomics	Genomics	Burapha University	Declared	0.0592 km^{2} (0.0229 sq mi)	Faculty of Pharmacy, BU	Chonburi	
EECtp	Innovation Technology Park	Eastern Economic Corridor Office of Thailand	Declared	0.8304 km^{2} (0.3206 sq mi)	Ban Chang	Rayong	
EEC Business Center & Livable Smart City	Smart city	Eastern Economic Corridor Office of Thailand	Declared	24 km^{2} (9.3 sq mi)	Huai Yai	Chonburi	

==== Industrial ====
There are currently 26 industrial estates and 2 industrial clusters in the Eastern Economic Corridor (EEC) of Thailand. The industrial estates are:

- 26 industrial estates: WHA Rayong Industrial Estate, Eastern Seaboard I.E. (Rayong), WHA Eastern Industrial Estate (Map Ta Phut), WHA Eastern Seaboard I.E.1, WHA Chonburi I.E.1, WHA Chonburi I.E.2, WHA Eastern Seaboard I.E.2, WHA Eastern Seaboard I.E.3, WHA Eastern Seaboard I.E.4, CPGC I.E. (Rayong), Amata City Chonburi I.E., Amata City Chonburi I.E. (2nd Project), Amata City Rayong I.E., Pinthong Industrial Estate, Pinthong Industrial Estate (Laem Chabang), Pinthong Industrial Estate (3rd Project), Pinthong Industrial Estate (4th Project), Pinthong Industrial Estate (5th Project), TFD I.E. (2nd Project), Yamato Industries I.E., Smart Park I.E., Asia Clean, Rojana Nongyai, Rojana Lamchabang, WHA Industrial Estate (Rayong), and EGCO Rayong Industrial Estate.
- 2 industrial clusters: Next-Generation Automotive Banpho and E-Commerce Bang Pakong.

=== Smart city ===
The EEC Livable Smart City, in its ultimate phase, will span over 10,000 hectares (100 square kilometers) and accommodate 2 million inhabitants. Its design prioritizes livability, sustainability, and smart technologies, with a central 64-hectare park and natural waterways connecting twelve districts. The city will also features various facilities, including government buildings, offices, a convention center, a retail market, a healthcare hub, a research and development hub, a start-up community, and a world-class sports complex for major international events.

== Public transport ==
=== Air ===
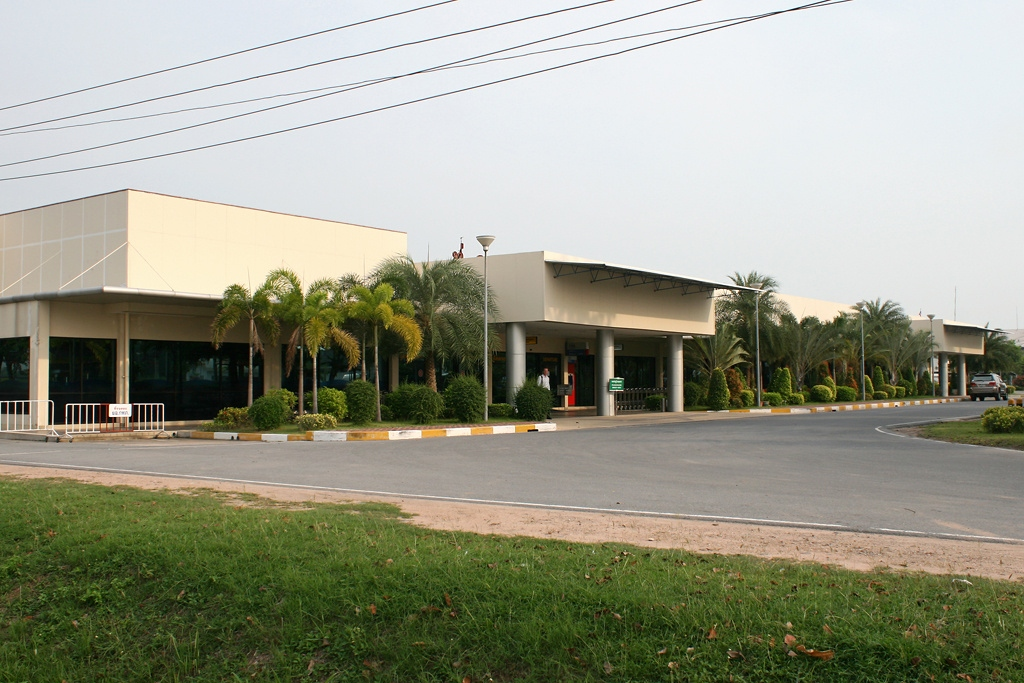
U-Tapao International Airport

The Eastern Economic Corridor is served by U-Tapao International Airport, one of three main commercial airports in the country. As Bangkok's two international airports are currently operating beyond capacity, the government intends to transform U-Tapao into a third major destination for airlines. To support this goal, the state government and private sector have developed a project plan to construct an airport with two 3,500-meter runways and 124 aircraft stands, along with supporting facilities such as an MRO Complex, an Aviation Training Center, and a Ground Transportation Center. The project is being undertaken by U-Tapao International Aviation Company Limited (BBS Joint Venture), which was awarded a 50-year contract and recently signed the Public Private Partnership Agreement of U-Tapao International Airport & Eastern Airport City Project on 19 June 2020. The signing ceremony was presided over by the Prime Minister General Prayut Chan-o-cha. U-Tapao International Aviation Company Limited is a joint venture among three large private companies: Bangkok Airways, BTS Group Holdings, and Sino-Thai Engineering and Construction.

The private sector partners will also construct a third Passenger Terminal Building, a Cargo Village, and a Free Trade Zone, among other commercial areas. These facilities will be seamlessly connected to the airport by a Ground Transportation Center, which will include a high-speed train, buses, and taxis. Additionally, an Automated People Mover (APM) will run through automated walkways and allow passengers to travel to and from the airport quickly and efficiently. The project will be completed in four phases, with the first phase set to be completed by 2024, accommodating 15.9 million passengers, and the final phase scheduled for completion in 2055, accommodating up to 60 million passengers annually.

The Eastern Airport City is a part of the larger initiative to improve transportation and logistics infrastructure in the EEC. It is a planned mixed-use development that will be integrated with U-Tapao International Airport, serving as a hub for aviation-related industries, logistics, and tourism. The Airport City will feature various commercial areas, including hotels, shopping malls, convention centers, and office buildings. The development is expected to attract both domestic and international investors, creating jobs and spurring economic growth in the region.

=== Rail ===
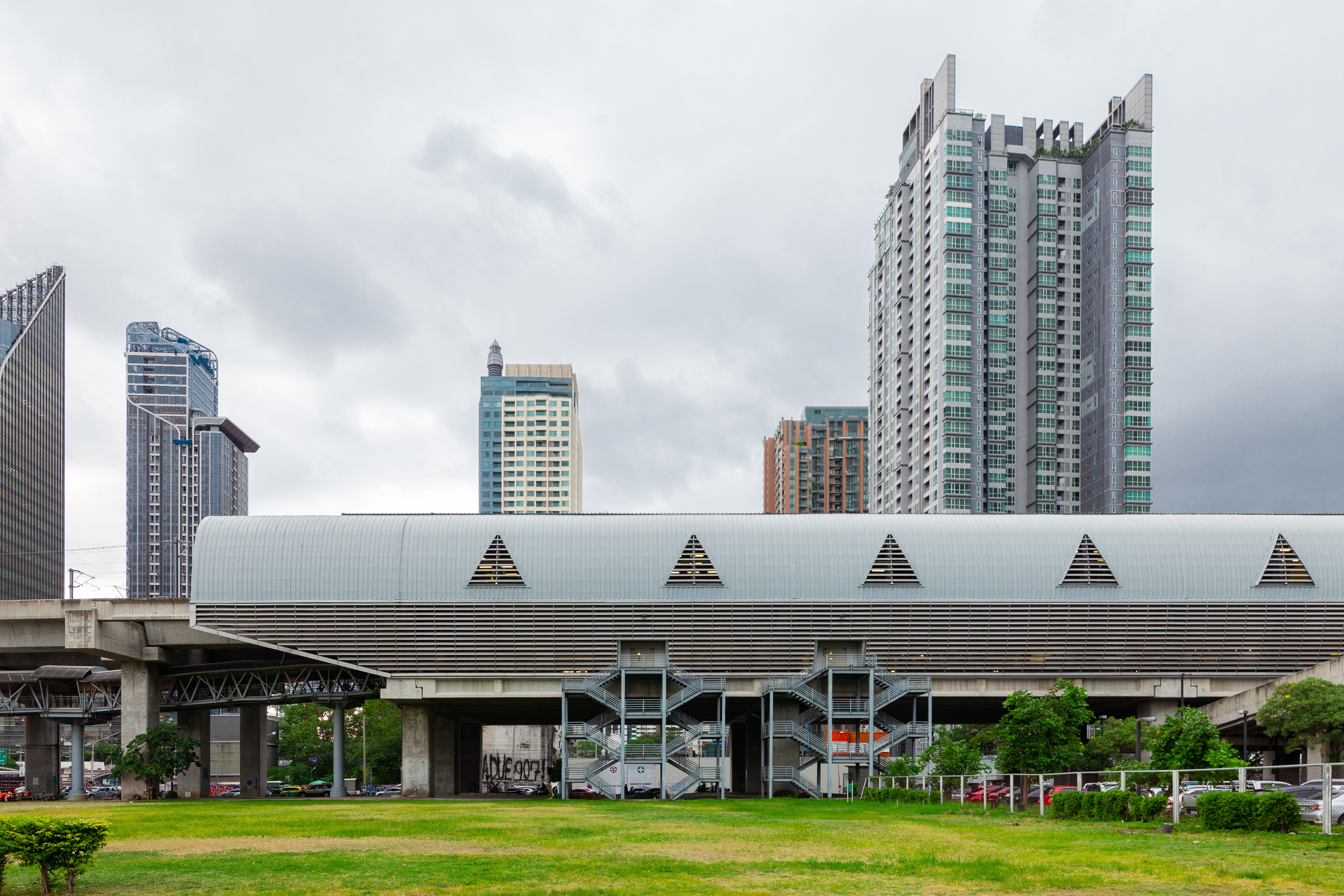
Makkasan is one of fifteen eastern high-speed rail stations.

The Eastern Economic Corridor is served by the State Railway of Thailand's (SRT) Eastern Line. The main stations are Chachoengsao Junction railway station and Chon Buri railway station.

A high-speed rail line is planned to serve the EEC. The Don Mueang–Suvarnabhumi–U-Tapao high-speed railway will connect Don Mueang International Airport, Suvarnabhumi Airport and U-Tapao International Airport. On 24 October 2019, a 224.5 billion baht (US$7.4bn) contract was signed by the Thai government and a consortium led by Charoen Pokphand Holding to build the railway. The consortium includes Charoen Pokphand (CP); Ch. Karnchang PLC (CK); Bangkok Expressway and Metro PLC (BEM); Italian-Thai Development PLC (ITD); and China Railway Construction Corporation Limited (CRCC). The 220 kilometre line will consist of 181 kilometres of elevated track, eight kilometres of underground track, and two kilometres of surface track. Construction of the rail line will begin 12 to 24 months from the date of contract signing. Trains on the route will operate at maximum speeds of 250 kmph. The consortium will have the right to operate and manage the rail line for 50 years after which project assets will revert to the government.

=== Road ===
The Ministry of Transport's plan to extend Motorway 7 (Bangkok-Chon Buri-Map Ta Phut) to connect U-Tapao International Airport with seaports and the Bangkok metropolitan area is aimed at integrating land transportation.

=== Water ===
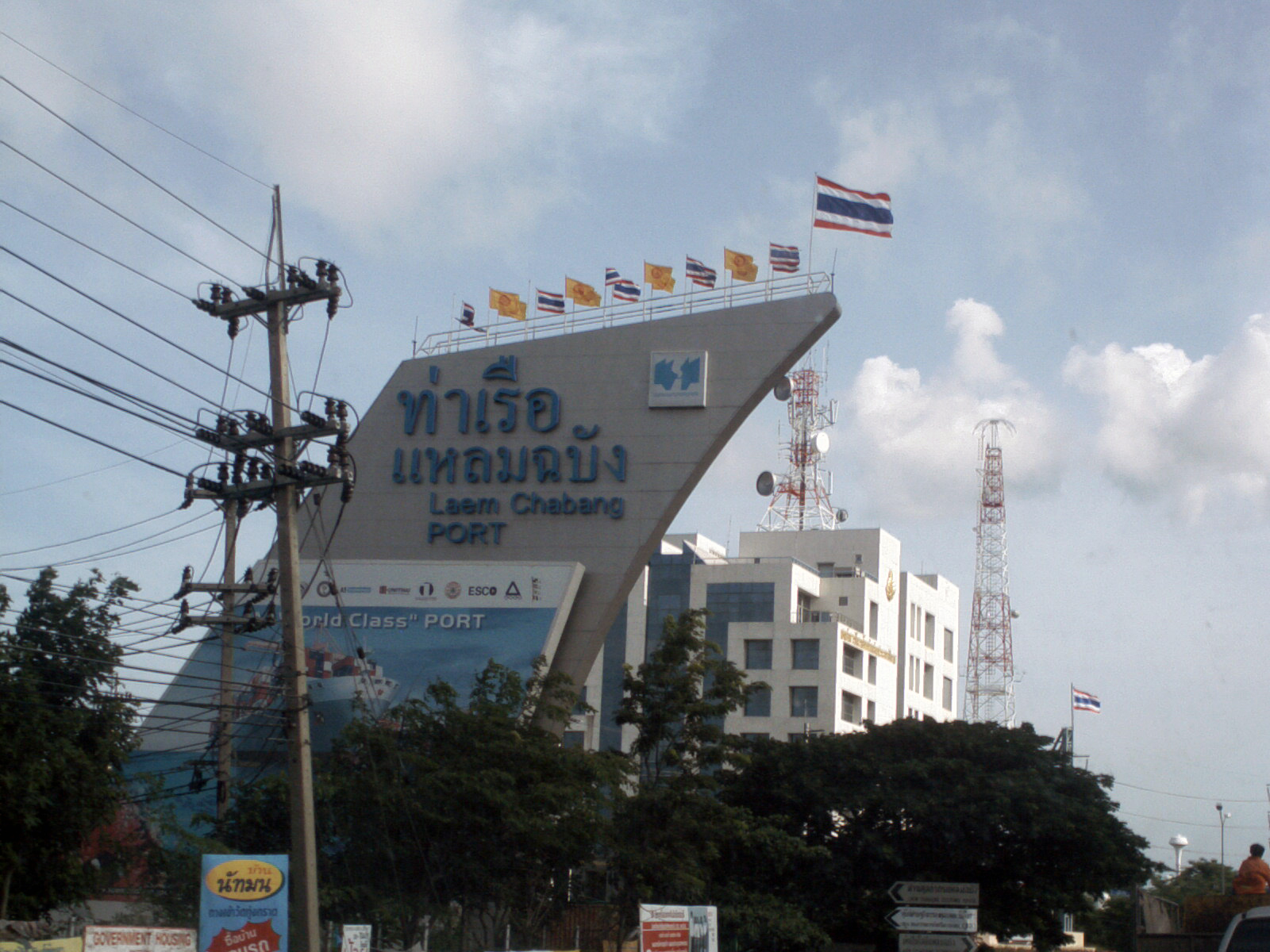
Laem Chabang Port

A passenger-only ferry service from Pattaya to Hua Hin began operation on 12 January 2017 but is no longer in operation. It was operated by Royal Passenger Liner. By road, the journey takes five to six hours. The ferry shortens travel time to about two hours, subject to sea conditions. The ferry cruises at 27 knots on the 113 km journey across the Gulf of Thailand with a maximum passenger capacity of 150 persons. Larger ferries carrying up to 260 people may be added to the service later. Ferries capable of carrying vehicles are projected for 2020.

The Eastern Economic Corridor is served by two ports: Laem Chabang Port and Map Ta Phut Port. Laem Chabang Port is main international port from its opening in 1991. It is Thailand's largest port. The port occupies 2,572 acres (1,041 ha) and is capable of handling the largest (Post-Panamax) vessels.

== Health, education and research ==
The EEC is home to Burapha University, Amata University (EEC campus of National Taiwan University), CMKL University (Carnegie Mellon University), and Asian Institute of Hospitality Management (Les Roches International School of Hotel Management, Switzerland). The University of Tokyo (Japan), Kyoto University (Japan), Waseda University (Japan), Hohai University (China), Hong Kong University of Science and Technology, and the Auckland University of Technology plan to open campuses in the EEC.

== See also ==
- Southern Economic Corridor (SEC)
- Central–Western Economic Corridor (CWEC)
- Northern Economic Corridor (NEC)
- Northeastern Economic Corridor (NEEC)
- Special Economic Zones (SEZ)
