= Southern Economic Corridor =

- Special Economic Zone
- Country: Thailand
- Region: Southern Thailand
- Provinces: 4 provinces: Chumphon; Ranong; Surat Thani; Nakhon Si Thammarat

Government
  - Type: Special economic zone

Area
  - Total: 32,141 km^{2} (12,410 sq mi)

Population (2019)
  - Total: 3,334,611
- Time zone: UTC+7 (ICT)

The Southern Economic Corridor (Abrv: SEC; Thai: การพัฒนาพื้นที่ระเบียงเศรษฐกิจภาคใต้อย่างยั่งยืน) is a special economic zone on the upper south of Thailand. It consists of four provinces, including Chumphon, Ranong, Surat Thani and Nakhon Si Thammarat. The SEC is part of a larger plan to link up the Andaman Sea with the Gulf of Thailand by land, air, and water, connecting the SEC with the Eastern Economic Corridor (EEC). The project aims to promote sustainable development, increase competitiveness, and connectivity with neighboring countries, including members of BIMSTEC.

== History ==
The Southern Economic Corridor (SEC) was approved by the Thai cabinet in August 2018 as a project that aims to connect transportation between the Gulf of Thailand and Andaman, resulting in a complete transport and communication linkage. It enables increased potential to support transport volume from the Eastern Economic Corridor (EEC) area to directly export/import to BIMSTEC countries, as well as Middle East and European countries.

== Infrastructure ==
The SEC project, including the Land Bridge Project, aims to improve transportation infrastructure between the Gulf of Thailand and Andaman, while also promoting green, culture, smart, and livable cities. In addition to developing and expanding airports such as Nakhon Si Thammarat, Ranong, and Surat Thani, plans are also underway to develop Ranong Port and Ao Ang Port to accommodate up to 40 million TEUs per side, improve coastal roads linking the Andaman Coast with the inner area of the South, expand the Ranong-Phang Nga highway to four lanes, and implement the double-track railway Chumphon-Ranong route, which has been designed to support Double Deck to transport containers on both sides of the port. The transport network will be 89.35 kilometers long with 2 deep-sea ports: 1 in Laem Riow, Chumphon, and 1 in Laem Ao Ang, Ranong. The Land Bridge Project aims to link the Gulf of Thailand with the Andaman Sea, resulting in a more efficient transportation network for the region. The project is expected to be approved by the cabinet in June 2023, and construction is planned to begin in 2025 with an estimated completion date of 2030.

== See also ==
- Central–Western Economic Corridor (CWEC)
- Eastern Economic Corridor (EEC)
- Northern Economic Corridor (NEC)
- Northeastern Economic Corridor (NEEC)
- Special Economic Zones (SEZ)
