= Northern Economic Corridor =

Thailand's economic corridor

- Special Economic Zone
- Country: Thailand
- Region: Northern Thailand
- Provinces: 4 provinces: Chiang Mai; Chiang Rai; Lampang; Lamphun

Government
  - Type: Special economic zone

Area
  - Total: 50,604 km^{2} (19,538 sq mi)

Population (2021)
  - Total: 3,920,954
- Time zone: UTC+7 (ICT)

The Northern Economic Corridor (Abrv: NEC–Creative LANNA; Thai: ระเบียงเศรษฐกิจพิเศษภาคเหนือ) is a special economic zone in Thailand that covers four provinces: Chiang Mai, Chiang Rai, Lampang, and Lamphun. It is designated as a production base for the creative economy based on the local culture, with a focus on sustainable development. The NEC aims to promote community and cultural tourism and improve products for export. This corridor focuses on developing infrastructure to support a creative economy, a telecommunications network to promote the North as a digital hub as well as wellness, smart city projects and organic foods.

The corridor is also aligned with the "Bio-Circular-Green Economy Model (BGC)", a national agenda to drive future industries under the Sustainable Development Goals (SDG) and promote stable and sustainable economic growth.

== History ==
The Thai government approved the designation of special economic corridors in four regions, including the Northern Economic Corridor (NEC), during a Cabinet meeting on September 20, 2022. The NEC encompasses Chiang Rai, Chiang Mai, Lamphun, and Lampang provinces and is intended to promote sustainable development of the country's main creative economy base, reduce income inequality, enhance quality of life for people, strengthen security in border areas, and increase competitiveness and connectivity with neighboring countries. The proposal was made by the Office of the National Economic and Social Development Council (NESDC) and approved by the National Policy Committee for the Development of Special Economic Zones, which is headed by the NESDC secretary.

== See also ==
- Central–Western Economic Corridor (CWEC)
- Eastern Economic Corridor (EEC)
- Northeastern Economic Corridor (NEEC)
- Southern Economic Corridor (SEC)
- Special Economic Zones (SEZ)
