= Northeastern Economic Corridor =

Special economic corridor of Thailand

- Special Economic Zone
- Country: Thailand
- Region: Northeastern Thailand
- Provinces: 4 provinces: Nakhon Ratchasima; Nong Khai; Khon Kaen; Udon Thani

Government
  - Type: Special economic zone

Area
  - Total: 45,742 km^{2} (17,661 sq mi)

Population (2021)
  - Total: 6,490,360
- Time zone: UTC+7 (ICT)

The Northeastern Economic Corridor (Abrv: NEEC – Bioeconomy Thai: ระเบียงเศรษฐกิจพิเศษภาคตะวันออกเฉียงเหนือ) is a special economic zone in Thailand that covers four provinces: Nakhon Ratchasima, Khon Kaen, Udon Thani, and Nong Khai. It is expected to serve as a new bio-industry base of the country, with modern technology implemented throughout the production chain. The NEEC focuses on developing a bioeconomy, specifically in the cultivation and production of rice, tapioca, and sugar cane.

== History ==
The Northeastern Economic Corridor (NEEC) was approved as a special economic zone in May 2022 by the National Committee for the Development of Special Economic Zones, which authorized the establishment of four new special economic corridors in an effort to stimulate the economy and decentralize income in Thailand. The NEEC comprises the provinces of Nakhon Ratchasima, Khon Kaen, Udon Thani, and Nong Khai. The cabinet acknowledged and approved the identification of the NEEC as a special economic zone during a meeting on September 20, 2022.

== See also ==
- Central–Western Economic Corridor (CWEC)
- Eastern Economic Corridor (EEC)
- Northern Economic Corridor (NEC)
- Southern Economic Corridor (SEC)
- Special Economic Zones (SEZ)
