= Mohammad Reza Kalaei =

Director of Sarakhs Special Economic Zone

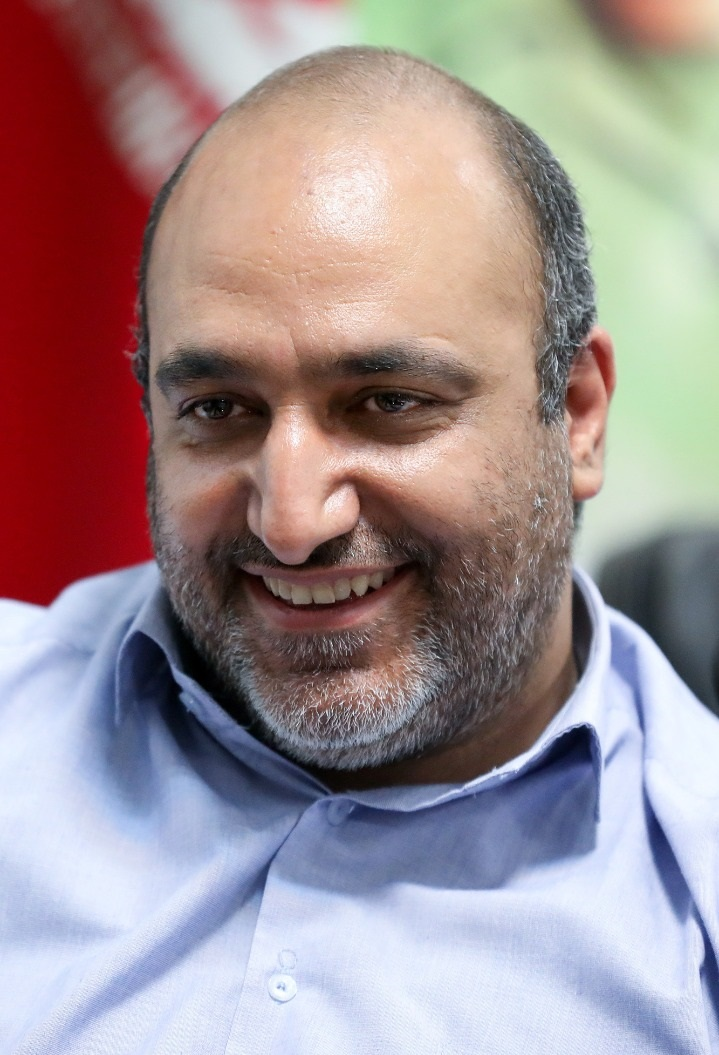

Director of Sarakhs Special Economic Zone
- In office 25 September 2021 – 29 July 2024
- Succeeded by: Mohammad Reza Rajabi Moghaddam

Mayor of Mashhad
- In office 11 December 2018 – 4 August 2021; Acting: 18 November 2018 - 10 December 2018
- Preceded by: Ghasem Taghizadeh Khamesi
- Succeeded by: Abdullah Erjaee Shirazi

Personal details
- Born: 8 January 1981 (age 45) Mashhad, Iran
- Party: Economist
- Education: Ferdowsi University of Mashhad

Mohammad Reza Kalaei (born 8 January 1980) is an economist who served as the Director of Sarakhs Special Economic Zone. He previously worked as the mayor of Mashhad.

He holds a PhD in Iranian Economics from Ferdowsi University of Mashhad. On November 18, 2018, kalaei was elected mayor by members of the Islamic City Council of Mashhad. On December 11, 2018, he officially started his activity with the order of Interior Minister Abdolreza Rahmani Fazli.

Prior to his election as mayor of Mashhad, Kalaei served in the Ministry of Cooperation, Labour, and Social Welfare, the National Steel Pension Fund, the Tehran Municipality and the Research Center of the Islamic Consultative Assembly.

Also, Kalaei participated in the elections of the tenth term of the Islamic Consultative Assembly as a candidate in the constituencies of Mashhad and Kalat, and with 226,645 votes, he was in the ninth place and did not enter the tenth term of the Islamic Consultative Assembly.

== Executive records ==
- Director General of Economic Monitoring and Evaluation of the Ministry of Cooperatives, Labour, and Social Welfare
- Deputy Minister of Planning and Corporate Affairs of the National Steel Pension Fund
- Deputy of Planning and Development of Urban Planning Affairs of Tehran Municipality
- Researcher of the Research Center of the Islamic Consultative Assembly
- Lecturer at Ferdowsi University of Mashhad
- Director of Planning and Supervision of Economic Affairs of Mashhad Municipality
- Economic Advisor of the Islamic City Council of Mashhad
- Deputy of Finance and Support of Mashhad Municipality

== Mayor of Mashhad ==
Kalaei, who started his activity as the youngest mayor of Iran's metropolises in Mashhad municipality, continued his work with the slogan of intra-city and provincial convergence. In the first months of his activity as the mayor of Mashhad, he had good interactions to solve the urban problems of Mashhad in different areas.

=== Settlement of arrears of Mashhad Municipality ===
Settlement of municipal debts to various institutions was one of the most important achievements of Mashhad Municipality during the administration of Mohammad Reza Kalaei. In the first months of the management period, all arrears were settled so that there is no arrears in Mashhad Municipality. His method in managing Mashhad Municipality was based on dependence on institutional economy.

=== Special attention to the environment ===
Despite the margins formed against the activities of Mashhad Municipality in the southern heights, the construction operations in the southern heights were stopped by a general order and a new recreational project was unveiled and the use of the southern belt was changed to a recreational space; ‌ A project called " "Mountain Park", which was both a recreation area for citizens and prevented the implementation of civil operations in the mountains and against the environment. However, the completion of the preparation of the "Mountain Park" project coincided with the widespread outbreak of COVID-19, and this global pandemic prevented the citizens of Mashhad from taking advantage of the space created in the nature of the city of Mashhad in the southern highlands.

=== Organizing the historic Kashafrud River ===
After several sessions and reviewing the dimensions of how to revive the Kashfrud River in Mashhad, with the decision of Alireza Razm Hosseini, the then governor of Khorasan Razavi, the unit management of this project was handed over to Mashhad Municipality. By the general order of the mayor of Mashhad; This work began in several different areas. According to the executive operations plan, the first refinery septazh in Iran started in Kashafrud River and planting 200,000 saplings along the Kashafrud River was on the agenda. At the request of the mayor of Mashhad and with the consent of the members of the Islamic Council of the city, this project was named "Park Boom" to be considered one of the four "green strategies" of urban management.

=== Special look at the countryside ===
One of the rare events of the fifth term of the city council was a good interaction with Astan Quds Razavi, which was unprecedented or unprecedented in the period after the Islamic Revolution of Iran. Interaction and cooperation with Astan Quds Razavi and of course with the participation of the governor of Khorasan Razavi caused 12 projects to be started in the suburbs of Mashhad for the growth of infrastructure and attention to low-income areas. This great and historic transformation began in the form of a scan called "One Less Margin, Hundreds More Opportunities."

One of the most important projects of Pooyesh, which was created with the focus on Mashhad city management, was the construction of the largest park on the outskirts of Mashhad, which was built in Shahid Rajaei town. Another important event that resulted from the interaction between Mashhad Municipality and Astan Quds Razavi and its goal was to improve and organize the town of Shahid Beheshti and Pardis town, the dam wall of Pardis town and Shahid Beheshti town collapsed after forty years.

=== Completion of work in Mashhad Municipality ===
After 990 days of activity in the guise of the mayor of Mashhad, Kalaei finally ended his work as the mayor of Mashhad on 13 August 2021 with the end of the fifth term of the Islamic Council of Mashhad.

It is worth mentioning that on September 11, 2021, during a ceremony at the Mashhad International Fair, the mayor of Mashhad said goodbye and was introduced.

== Director of Sarakhs Special Economic Zone ==
On September 25, 2021, Mohammad Reza Kalaei, the former mayor of Mashhad, was appointed CEO and member of the board of directors of the Sarakhs Special Economic Zone.
