= Ehsan Osuli =

Sport administrator of Iran

Member of the Football Federation Islamic Republic of Iran
- In office 28 February 2021 – 1 March 2025

Personal details
- Born: Mashhad, Iran

Ehsan Osuli (Persian: احسان اصولی) is an Iranian sports director, served as a spokesperson and member of the Football Federation Islamic Republic of Iran.

He represented provincial football boards within the Football Federation.

Osuli also was heads the futsal committee and the organization of the Football Federation League. Additionally, he was a member of the Islamic City Council of Mashhad and chaired the cultural commission during the council's fifth term.
