= Sarakhs Special Economic Zone =

Special economic zones in Iran

Agency overview
- Formed: May 13, 1996
- Headquarters: 36.32°N 61.10°E
- Agency executive: Mohammad Reza Rajabi Moghaddam

Sarakhs Special Economic Zone is one of the 34 special economic zones in Iran, which is located in Razavi Khorasan province. The main focus in these areas is on simplifying business processes. For this reason, these areas have freer exchange rules, various exemptions from tariffs and customs duties, and simpler exchange methods than the mainland.

The activity of this special economic zone started on May 13, 1996, at the same time with the opening of the Mashhad-Sarakhs-Tajan railway with the presence of leaders and representatives of more than 100 countries.

Special economic zones are specific geographical areas at the entry and exit points of the country. These areas have been created in order to attract foreign and domestic capital as well as to create a suitable platform for industrial, manufacturing and commercial activities with the aim of increasing the export of goods and providing desirable services for active presence in regional and international markets.

== Location ==
This region is located in the northeastern tip of Iran in Razavi Khorasan province, 150 km east of the holy city of Mashhad and 15 km from the city of Sarakhs, and borders Turkmenistan to the north and east. (Length 61.10 East and Latitude 36.32 North with an altitude of 235 meters above sea level)

== Management ==
On September 29, 2021, Mohammad Reza Kalaei, the former mayor of Mashhad, was introduced as the new managing director of the Sarakhs Special Economic Zone.

== Advantage ==
The possibility of connecting to the zero point of the border with Turkmenistan and connecting to the Mashhad-Sarakhs-Tajan railway, which passes through the special zone and connects the railways of Central Asian countries with European countries, is one of the advantages of this special economic zone.

== Activities ==
- Commodity security
- Accelerate and facilitate the purchase of goods to bring closer the scene of activity of the owners of goods, including raw materials, machinery and other goods made with domestic consumers in order to support domestic production
- Process the product or make changes to it to gain added value using potential facilities
- Provide the necessary facilities for major domestic buyers to obtain the required goods in these areas, approach regional trade markets and expand the country's foreign trade
- Establish regional trade activities according to the markets of Central Asia, Caucasus and Transcaucasia
- Communication with Asian and European countries and other places and useful exploitation of these markets by using domestic and foreign transit facilities for export and re-export
- Attracting internal and external capital and facilities for the above-mentioned cases in order to achieve the desired goals by observing the relevant laws and regulations

== See also ==
- List of special economic zones
- Foreign direct investment in Iran
- Razavi Khorasan province
- Sarakhs
