= Eastern Thailand =

Region of Thailand

Coordinates: 13°27′N 101°36′E

Eastern Region ภาคตะวันออก
- Region
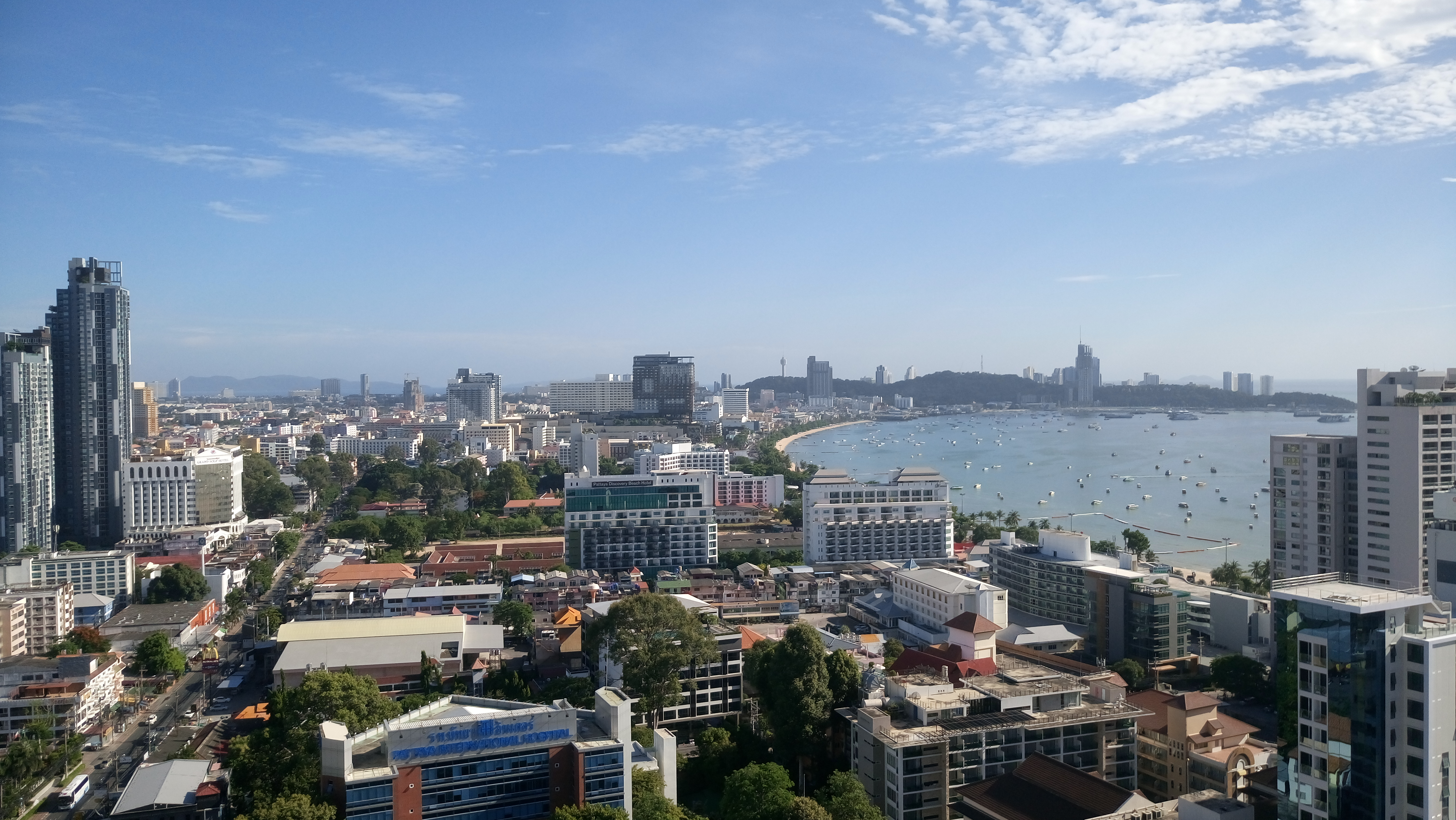
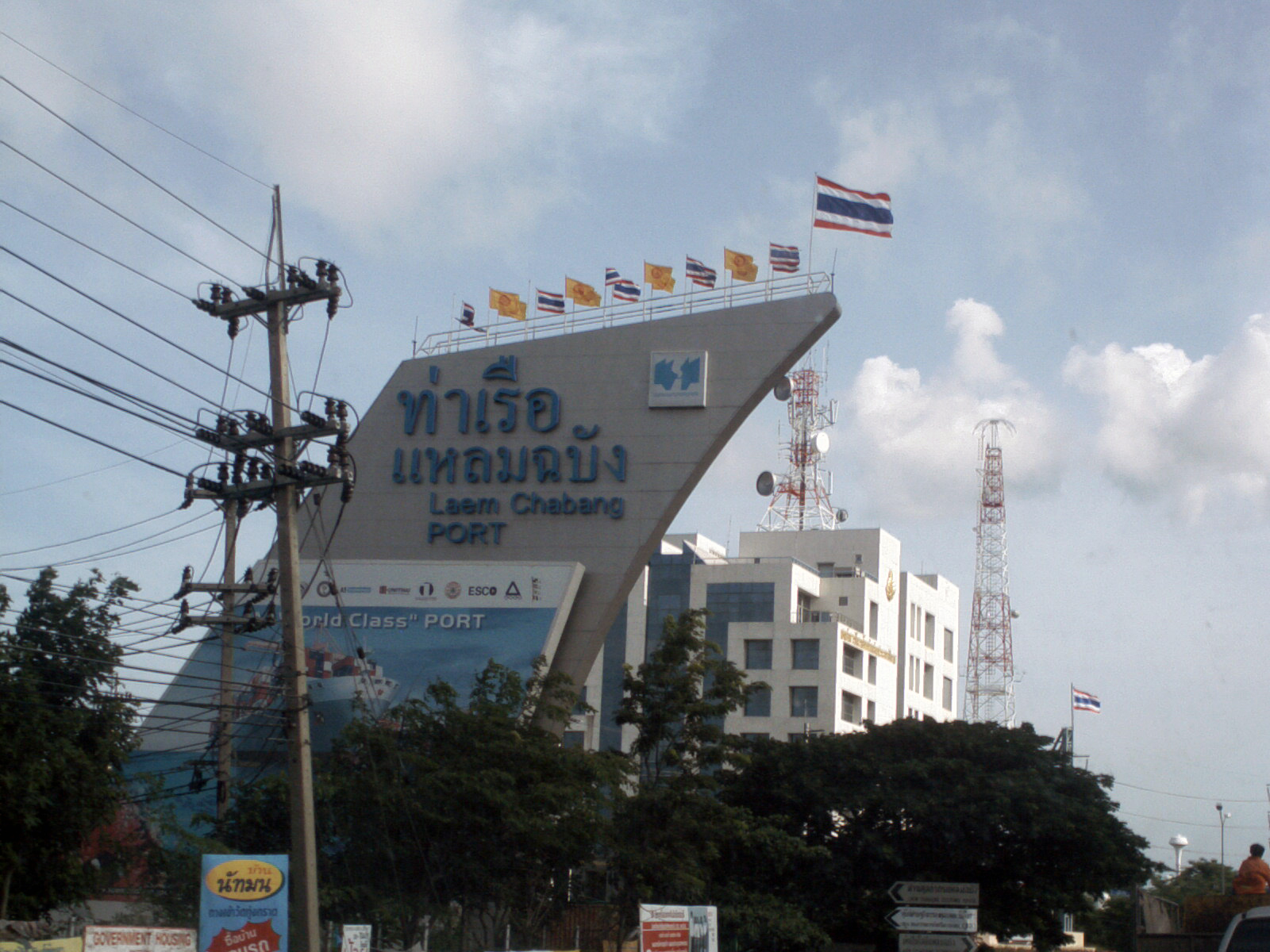
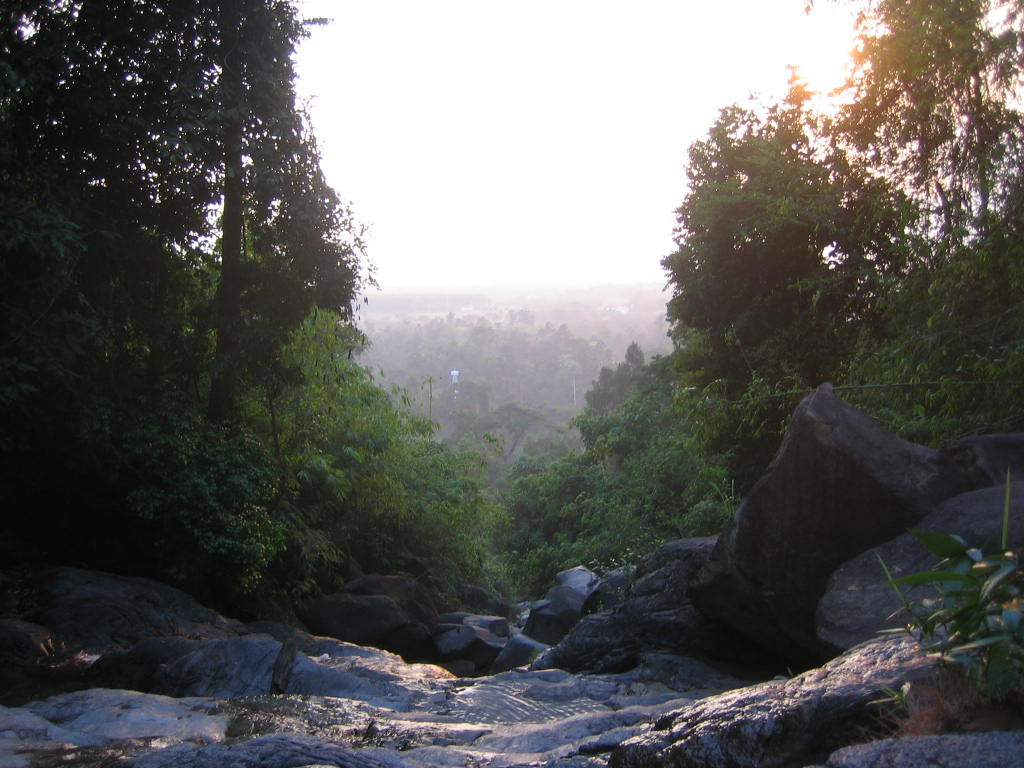
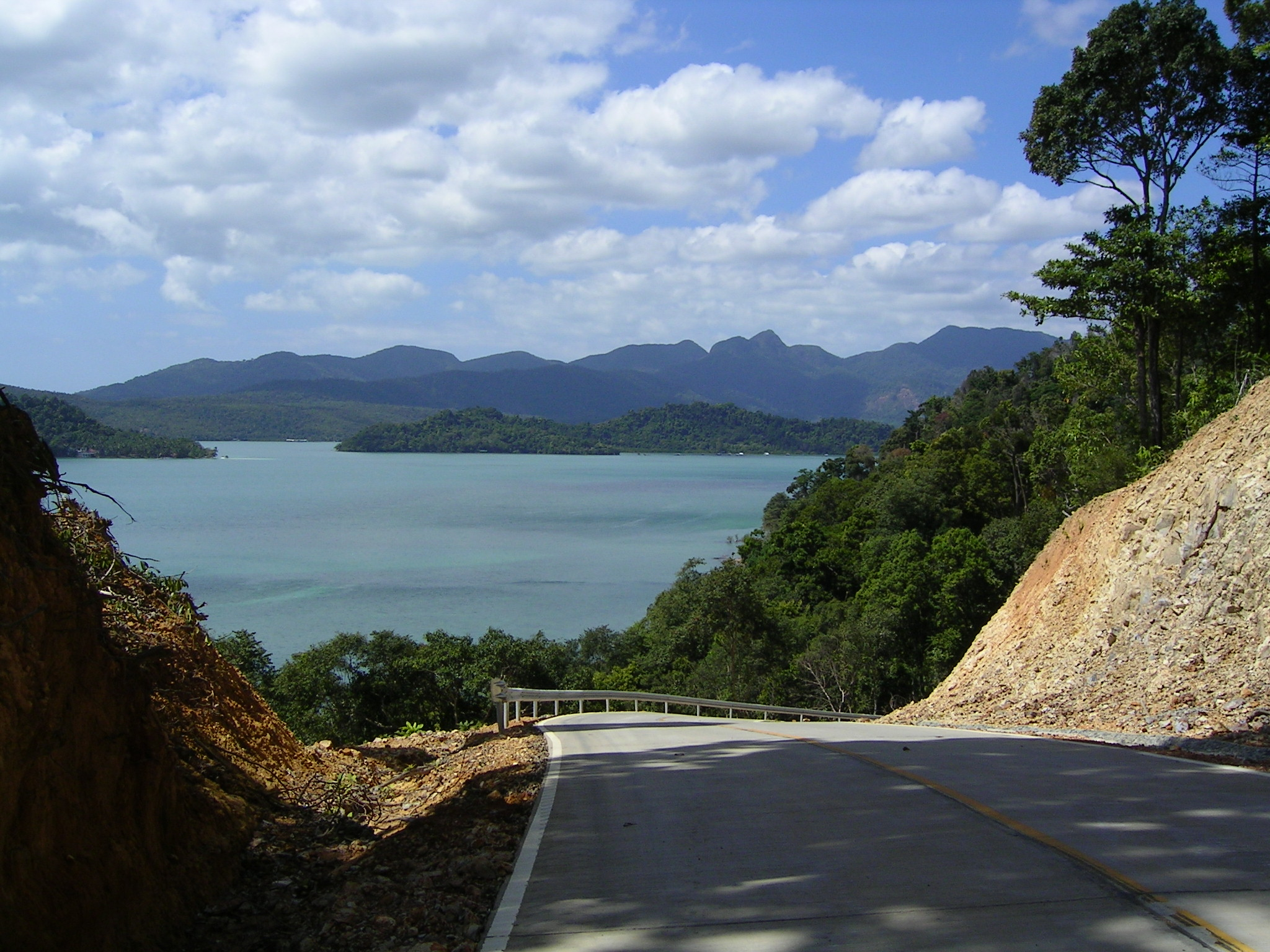
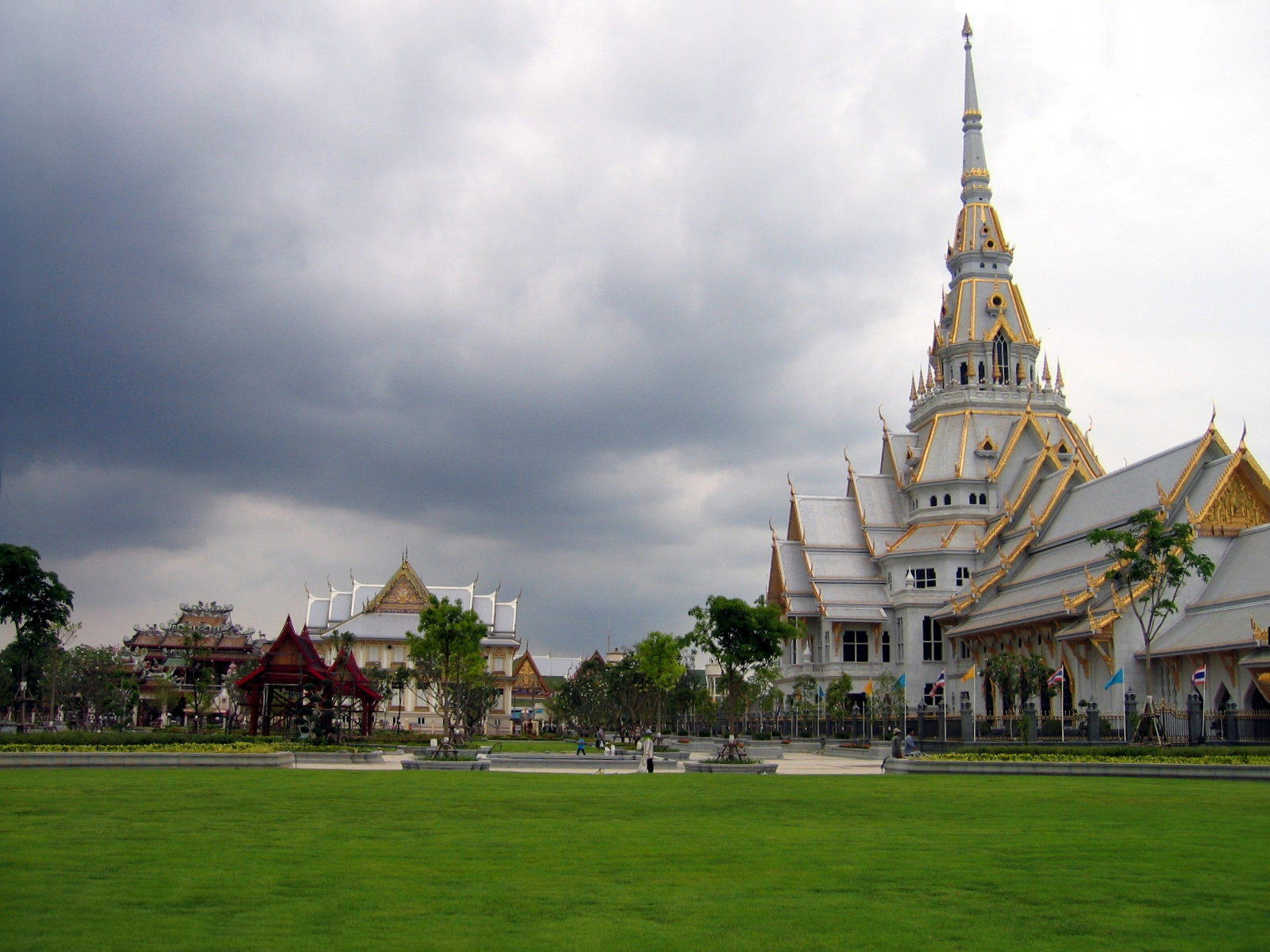
- From upper-left to lower-right: Pattaya in daytime, Port of Laem Chabang, Khao Khitchakut, Ko Chang and Wat Sothonwararam

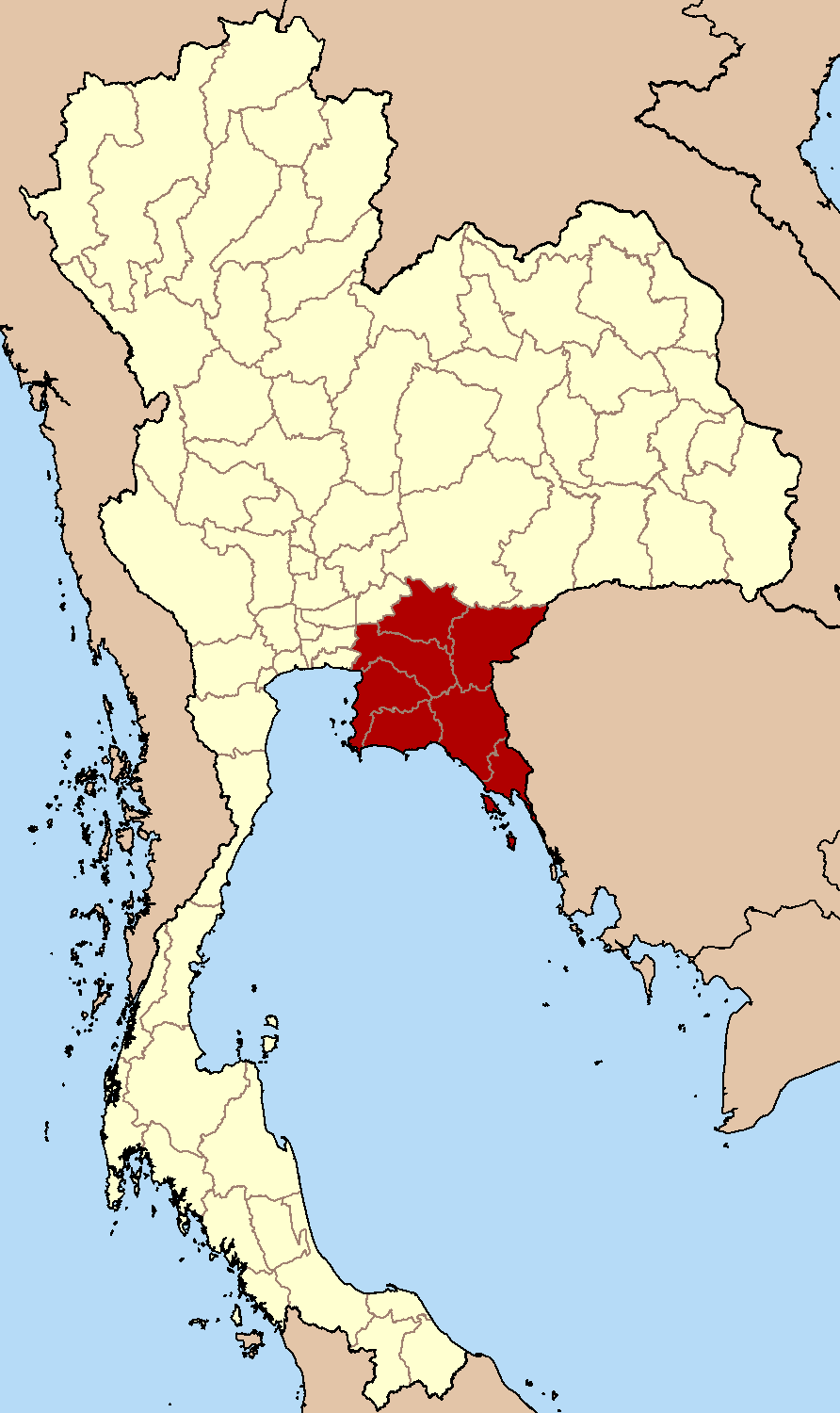
- Eastern Region in Thailand
- Largest city: Sriracha-Pattaya Metropolitan area
- Provinces: 7: Chachoengsao province; Chanthaburi province; Chonburi province; Prachinburi province; Rayong province; Sa Kaeo province; Trat province

Area
  - Total: 34,481 km^{2} (13,313 sq mi)

Population (2019)
  - Total: 4,841,806
  - Density: 140.42/km^{2} (363.68/sq mi)

GDP (Nominal, 2024)
  - Metro: ฿3.312 trillion (US$94.061 billion)
  - Per capita: ฿499,397 (US$14,183)
- Time zone: UTC+07:00 (Thailand)

Eastern Thailand is a region of Thailand, bordering Cambodia in the east, Northeastern Thailand in the north, and Central Thailand in the west.

== Geography ==
Eastern Thailand lies between the Sankamphaeng Range, which forms a natural border with the Khorat Plateau to the north and the Gulf of Thailand to the south. The geography of the region is characterised by short mountain ranges (collectively grouped under the Chanthaburi Range) alternating with small basins of short rivers which drain into the Gulf of Thailand. Between the Chanthaburi and Sankamphaeng mountains lies the basin of the Bang Pakong River system.

Fruit is a major component of agriculture in the area, and tourism plays a strong part in the economy. The region's coastal location has helped promote eastern seaboard industrial development, a major factor in the economy of the region.

Islands off Eastern Thailand's coast include Ko Sichang, Ko Lan, Ko Samet, and Ko Chang.

=== National parks ===
Within the eastern region there are some eight national parks. Pang Sida National Park covering 844 km^{2} in Sa Kaeo province, it constitutes a part of the Dong Phayayen-Khao Yai Forest Complex UNESCO World Heritage Site, covering in total around 6,100 km^{2}. The total forest parent area is 8,205 km^{2} (3,168 sq mi) or 22.4 percent of this eastern region area (incl. Nakhon Nayok province). Mu Ko Chang National Park in Trat province includes 85 per cent of Thailands second largest island Ko Chang. The beaches on the western coast of Ko Chang have been excluded from the national park for reason of facilitating the tourism industry. Mu Ko Samet National Park in Rayong province is just 6 km long by 3 km wide with beaches covered with some of the finest white sand in the country.

== Administrative divisions ==
According to the six geographical regions established by the National Research Council of Thailand, the eastern region includes seven provinces.

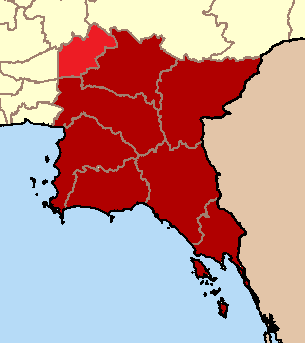

The Thai Meteorological Department (TMD), the Office of the National Economic and Social Development Council (NESDC) and Royal Forest Department (RFD) also include province Nakhon Nayok in the Eastern region.

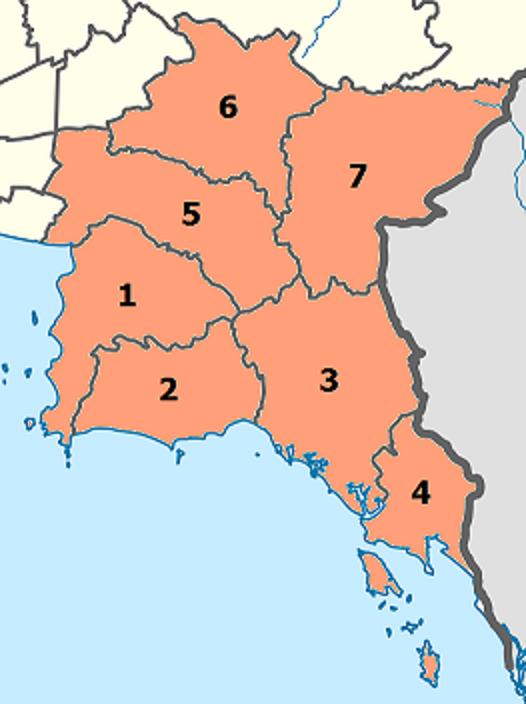

Flag	Seal		Province	Capital	DOPA	Popul.	Area (km^{2})	Dens.	ISO
		1	Chonburi	Chonburi	9	1,558,301	4,508	346	TH-20
		2	Rayong	Rayong	50	734,753	3,666	201	TH-21
		3	Chanthaburi	Chanthaburi	7	537,698	6,415	84	TH-22
		4	Trat	Trat	16	229,958	2,866	78	TH-23
		5	Chachoengsao	Chachoengsao	8	720,113	5,169	139	TH-24
		6	Prachin Buri	Prachin Buri	31	494,680	5,026	99	TH-25
		7	Sa Kaeo	Sa Kaeo	63	566,303	6,831	83	TH-27

Note: Population is based on "Statistics, population and house statistics for the year 2019" from Registration Office Department of the Interior. Reference date is 31 December 2019.
Area is based on "Thailand boundary from Department of Provincial Administration.

== Economy ==
For fiscal year 2018, Eastern Thailand Region had a combined economic output of 3,026 trillion baht (US$97.6 billion), or 18.5 percent of Thailand's GDP. Rayong province had an economic output of 1.045 trillion baht (US$33.7 billion). This amounted to a per-capita Gross Provincial Product (GPP) value of 1,067,449 baht (US$34,434), almost double the GPP per-capita of the three following provinces in the ranking.

Gross Provincial Product (GPP)
Rank	Province	GPP (million baht)	Population (x 1000)	GPP per capita (baht)
1	Rayong	1,045.7	980	1,067,449
2	Chonburi	1,030.9	1,819	566,801
3	Prachin Buri	319.0	621	513,789
4	Chachoengsao	386.6	823	469,539
5	Chanthaburi	120.2	553	217,393
6	Trat	43.1	267	161,322
7	Nakhon Nayok	30.2	259	116,717
8	Sa Kaeo	50.8	630	80,716
	Eastern region	3,026,495	5,951	508,568

View source data.

=== Economic Affluence in Eastern Thailand ===
- Eastern Thailand, which comprises the provinces in the Eastern Economic Corridor, has emerged as one of the most affluent regions outside the Bangkok Metropolitan Region.
- Its strategic location along the Gulf of Thailand provides direct access to major shipping routes, with deep‐sea ports such as Laem Chabang Port and Map Ta Phut Industrial Estate serving as crucial gateways for international trade; excellent connectivity via Highways, rail (including planned high-speed projects), and proximity to international airports like U-Tapao International Airport further enhance its role as a logistics hub, reducing transportation costs and boosting trade efficiency.
- The region is home to a dense concentration of export‐oriented industries—including the Automotive industry, Petrochemical industry, Electronics manufacturing and heavy manufacturing—that have attracted significant Foreign direct investment and driven increases in regional gross regional product and per capita income; the early success of the Eastern Seaboard Development Project laid a strong foundation for sustained industrial growth.
- Robust government initiatives under the Eastern Economic Corridor have spurred extensive infrastructure development, with incentives such as tax breaks, streamlined regulations, and improved industrial estates making the region highly attractive to both domestic and foreign investors, thereby creating jobs and stimulating technological upgrades and innovation.
- Increasing diversification into high-value production sectors—including advanced electronics, robotics, and digital innovation—ensures higher productivity, improved job quality, and stronger economic resilience.

== Languages ==
The main language of Eastern Thailand is Central Thai but regional languages are also common. Krungthep dialect, the dominant variant, is spoken among Thai Chinese communities, the Eastern Economic Corridor EEC (such as in Chonburi, Siracha, Pattaya, Padriew, Bangpakong etc.). The dialect from Prachinburi Province is quite similar to the Ayutthaya dialect, the traditional working-class dialect of Bangkok, and the Rayong and the Chantaburi dialects are quite similar to the Suphanburi dialect, another dialect in Central Thailand.

Isan has a minority status in Eastern Thailand and is spoken usually in the eastern part of Prachinburi and the upper part of Sa Kaeo Province. It this is the same variant as the Khonkaen dialect (Standard Lao language). Khmer language in Eastern Thailand is spoken mostly by the older generation in Chanthaburi and has become endangered.

== See also ==
- Regions of Thailand
- Eastern seaboard of Thailand
