= Western Thailand =

Coordinates: 14°00′N 99°30′E

Western Region ภาคตะวันตก
- Region
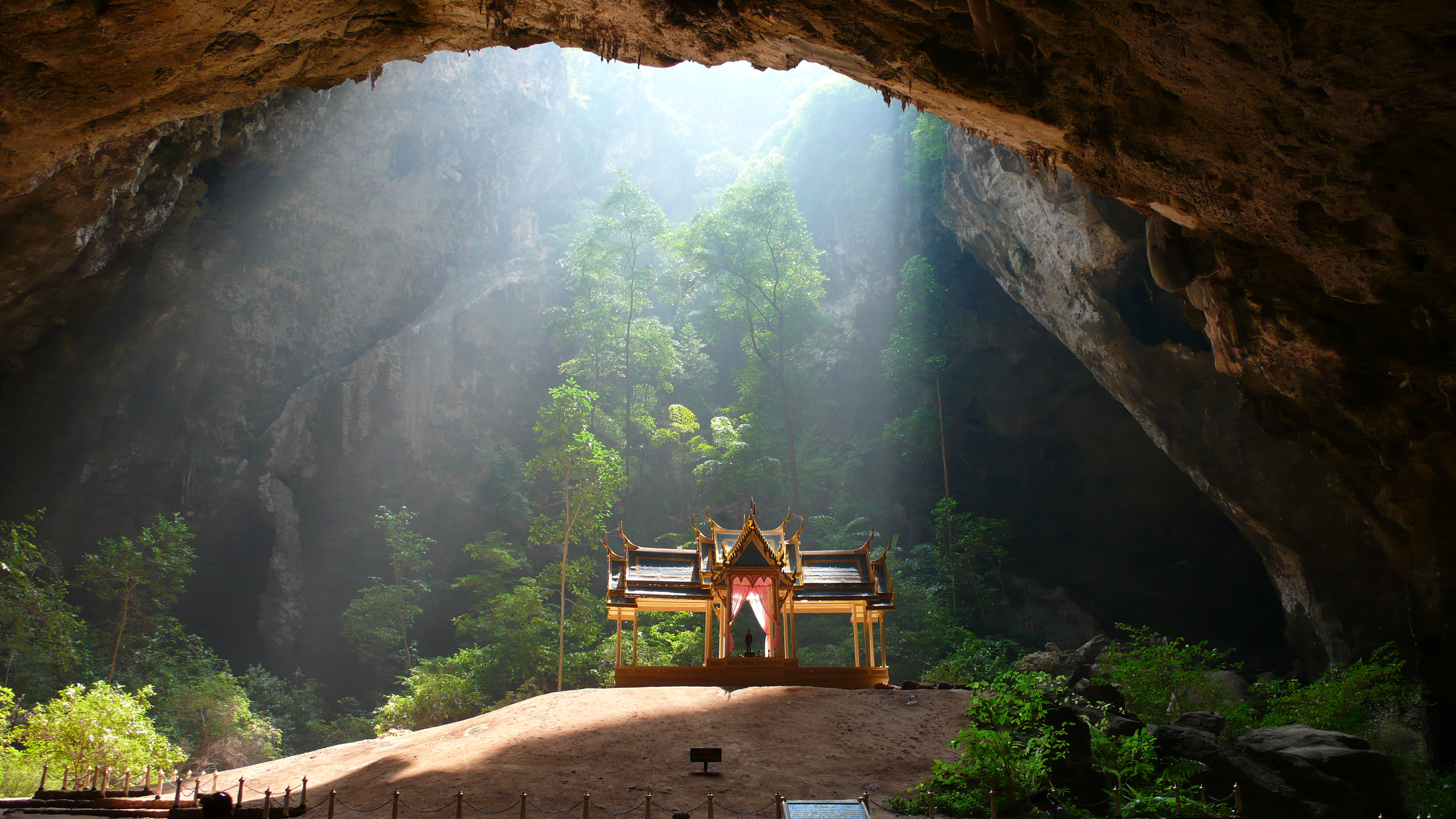
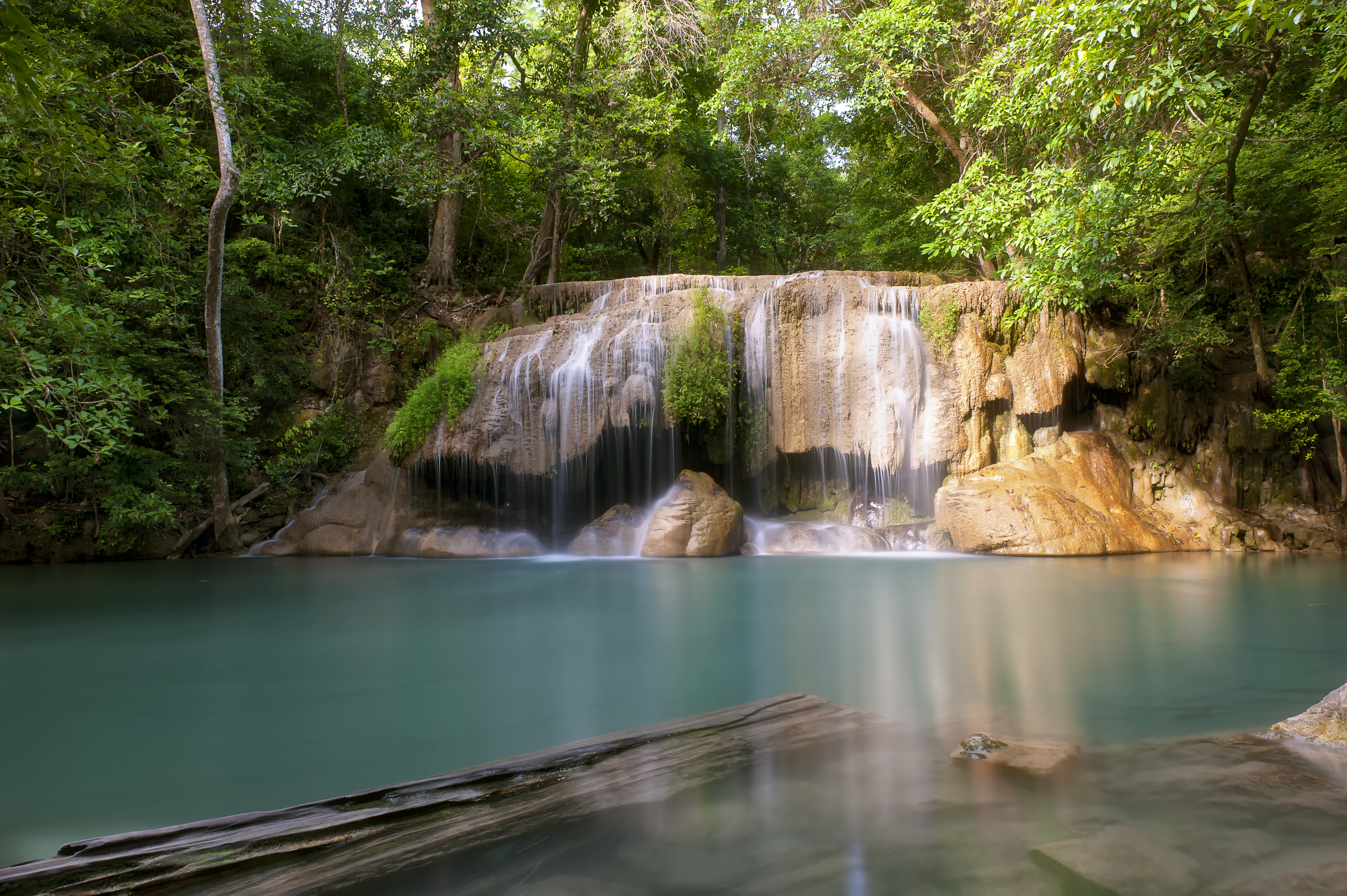
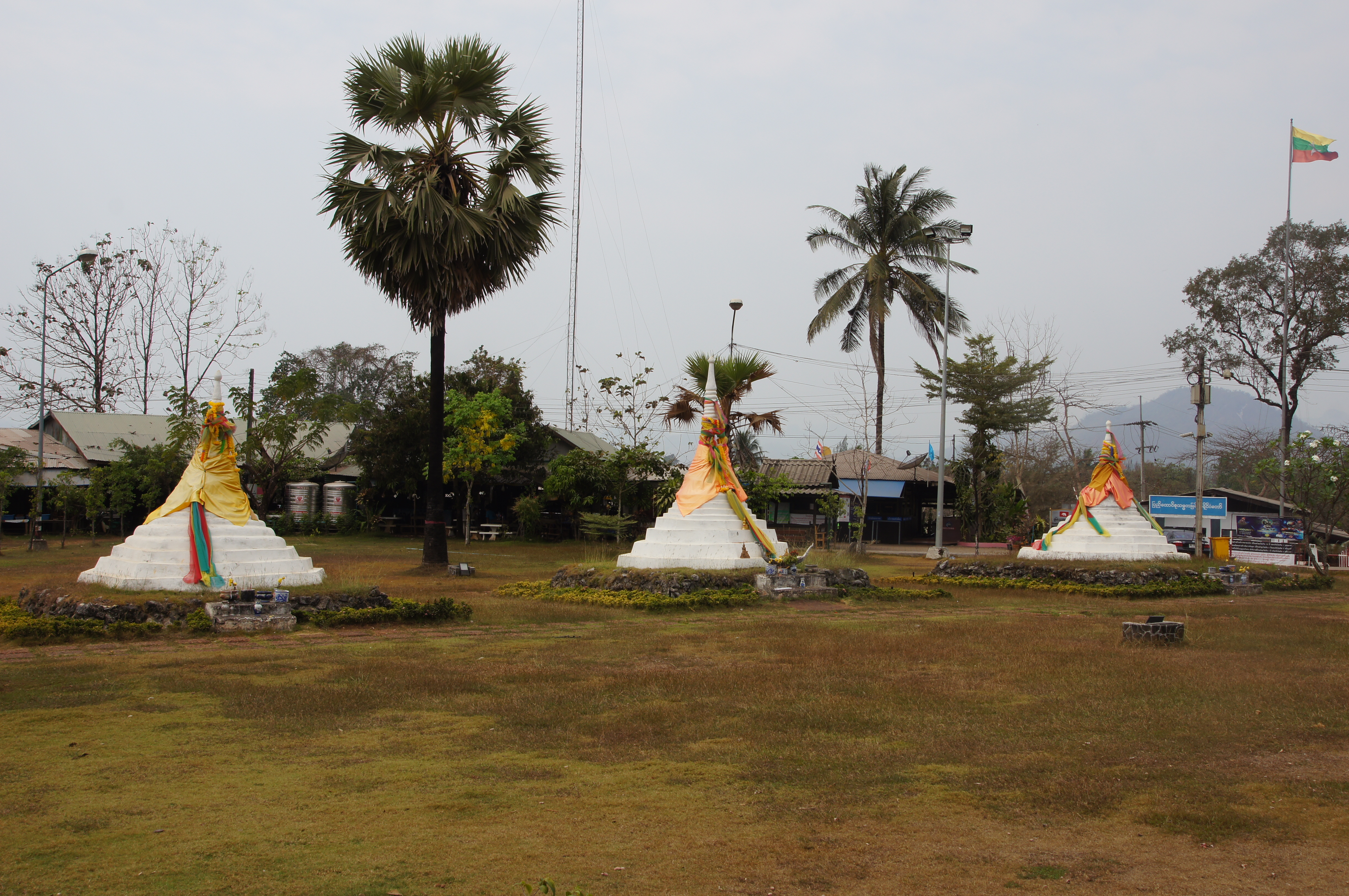
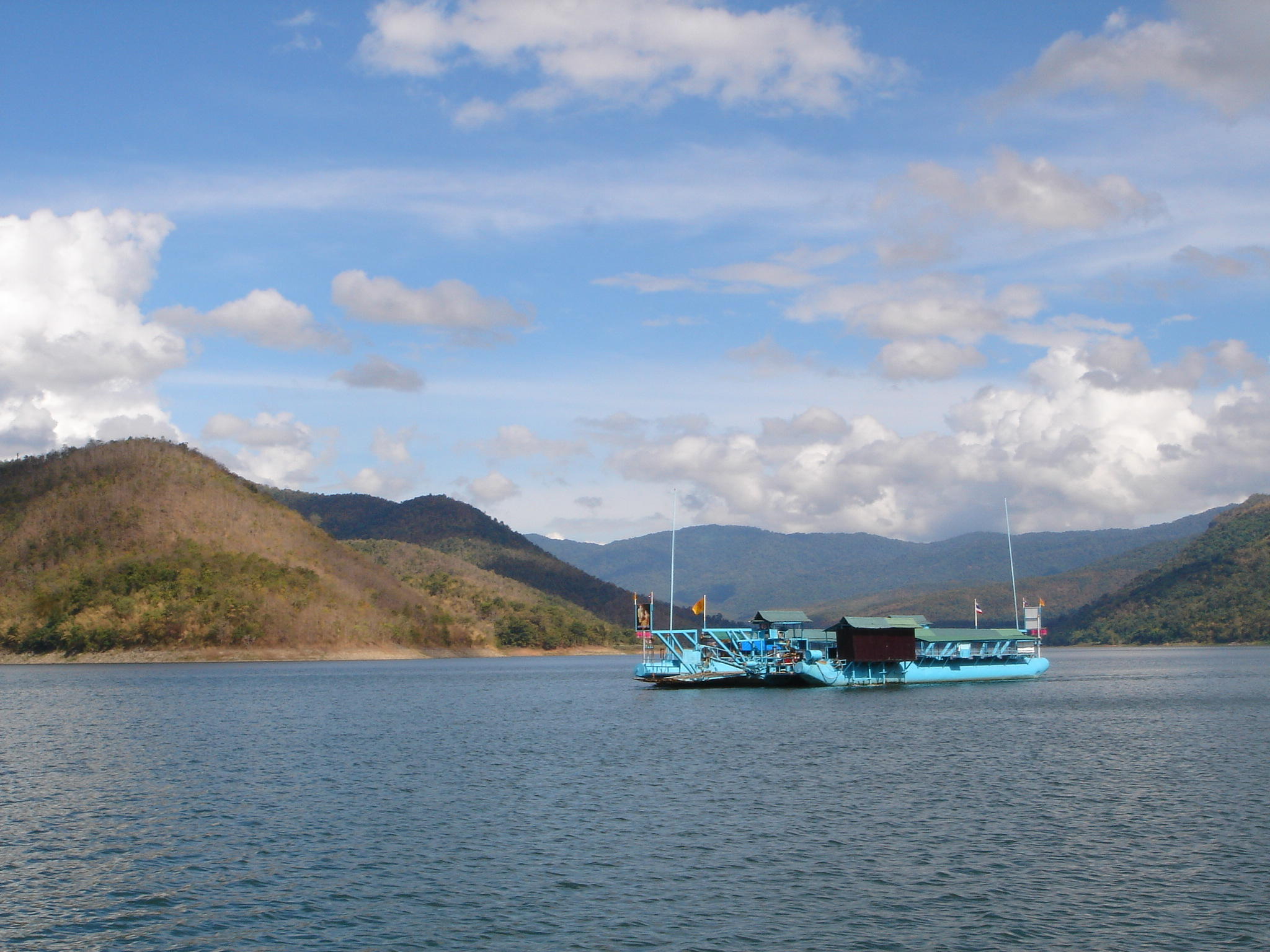
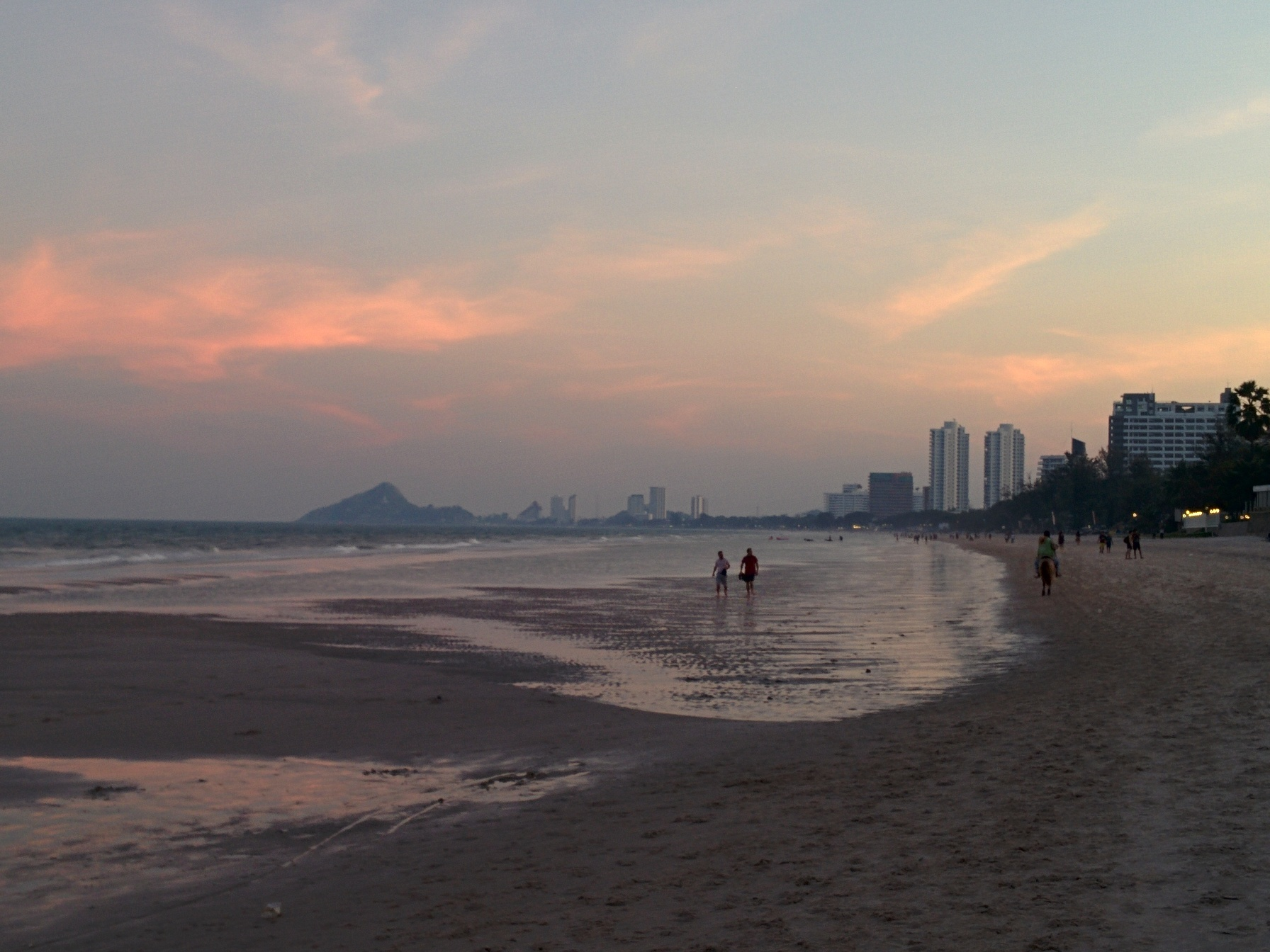
- From upper-left to lower-right: Khao Sam Roi Yot, Erawan Waterfall, Three Pagodas Pass, Srinagarind Dam and Hua Hin Beach

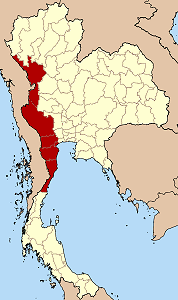
- Western Region in Thailand
- Largest city: Hua Hin
- Provinces: 5 Provinces: Kanchanaburi Province; Phetchaburi Province; Prachuap Khiri Khan Province; Ratchaburi Province; Tak Province

Area
  - Total: 53,769 km^{2} (20,760 sq mi)

Population (2018)
  - Total: 3,430,314
  - Density: 63.797/km^{2} (165.23/sq mi)

GDP (Nominal, 2024)
  - Metro: ฿647 billion (US$18.375 billion)
  - Per capita: ฿177,290 (US$5,035)
- Language: Thai • others

Western Thailand is a region of Thailand bordering Myanmar to the west, Southern Thailand to the south and central Thailand to the east.

== Geography ==
Thailand's long mountainous border with Myanmar continues south from Northern Thailand into Western Thailand and follows the Tenasserim Hills. The narrow region stretches from Bangkok's outer reaches to the border with Myanmar and from the Shan Hills in the north to Chumphon Province in the south.

Western Thailand's geography is characterised by high mountains and steep river valleys. The region hosts much of the country's less-disturbed forest areas. Water and minerals are important natural resources. Western Thailand is home to many of the country's major dams, and mining is an important industry. Village names in the region are often based on its physical geography.

== Provinces ==
According to the six geographical regions established by the National Research Council of Thailand, Western Thailand includes the following provinces:

1. Kanchanaburi (กาญจนบุรี)
2. Phetchaburi (เพชรบุรี)
3. Prachuap Khiri Khan (ประจวบคีรีขันธ์)
4. Ratchaburi (ราชบุรี)
5. Tak (ตาก)

== Economy ==
For economic statistics of Western Thailand, Suphan Buri and Samut Songkhram provinces are listed by National Statistical Office (Thailand). However Tak Province is listed by (lower) Northern Thailand.
For FY 2018, Western Thailand Region had a combined economic output of 579.815 billion baht (US$18.7 billion), or 3.5 percent of Thailand's GDP. Ratchaburi province had an economic output of 189.68 billion baht (US$6.12 billion). This amounts to a GPP per capita of 233,258 baht (US$7,524), more than double for Suphan Buri province, lowest in the ranking.

Gross Provincial Product (GPP)
Rank	Province	GPP (million baht)	Population (x 1000)	GPP per capita (baht)
1	Ratchaburi	189,680	813	233,258
2	Prachuap Khiri Khan	93,381	488	191,306
3	Phetchaburi	72,035	499	144,392
4	Samut Songkhram	25,974	182	142,808
5	Kanchanaburi	107,144	829	129,304
6	Suphan Buri	91,602	854	107,228
	Western region	579,815	3,665	158,206

View source data.

== Weather forecast ==
Kanchanaburi, Ratchaburi, Suphan Buri, and Samut Songkhram Provinces have been added to the central region by the Thai Meteorological Department (TMD).

Petchaburi and Prachuap Khiri Khan Provinces are part of the southern region (east coast).

== See also ==
- Regions of Thailand
- Tenasserim Hills
