= Islamic City Council of Mashhad =

Islamic City Council of Mashhad شورای اسلامی شهر مشهد مقدس Shōrā-ye-Eslāmi-ye-Shahr-e-Mashhad
- 6th Islamic City Council of Mashhad
- Logo of the council

Type
- Type: Unicameral

History
- Founded: 29 April 1999; 27 years ago
- New session started: 5 August 2021

Leadership
- Chairman: Hassan Movahedian since 5 August 2021
- Vice Chairman: Iman Farahmandi since 5 August 2021
- Speaker: Mosalreza Haji Bagloo since 5 August 2021

Structure
- Seats: 15
- Length of term: 4 years

Elections
- Voting system: Plurality-at-large voting
- Last election: 18 June 2021

Meeting place
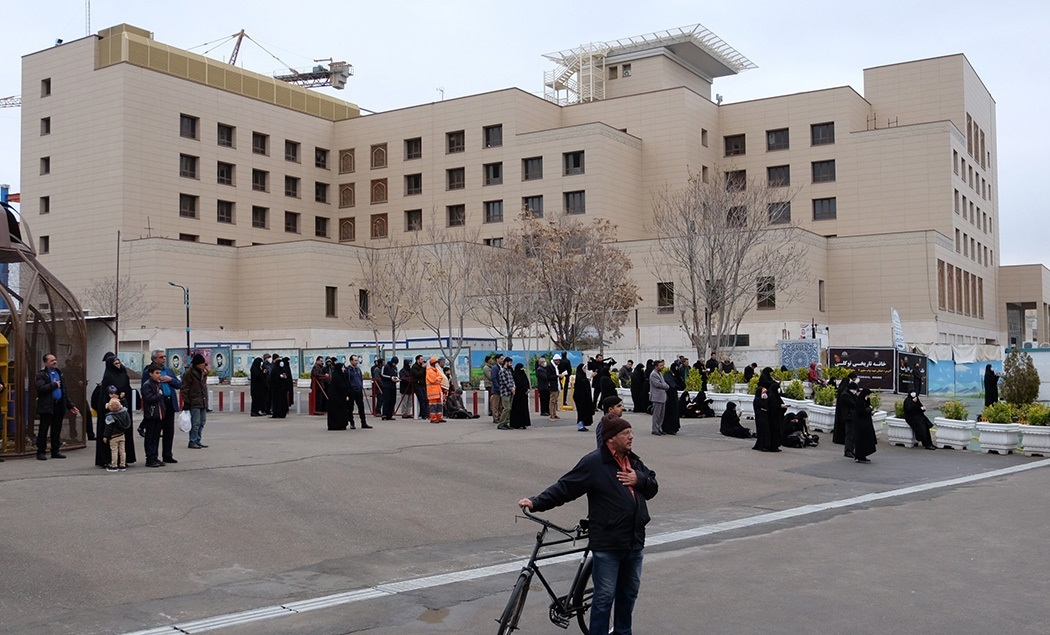
- Mashhad City Hall; Shohada Square

Website
- shora.mashhad.ir

The Islamic City Council of Mashhad (Persian: شورای اسلامی شهر مشهد مقدس) is the directly elected council that presides over the city of Mashhad and elects the mayor in a mayor–council government system.

== Members ==
#	Member	Bloc	Party	Votes
1	Iman Farahmandi			150,198
2	Hossein Hesami			145,521
3	Ebrahim Alizade			138,804
4	Hassan Movahedian			131,541
5	Hassan Mansoorian			121,516
6	Majid Tahoorian Asgari			118,335
7	Majid Dabirian			117,183
8	Fateme Salimi			108,512
9	Mosalreza Haji Bagloo			108,208
10	Hossein Alavi Moqadam			105,994
11	Hamid Zamiri Jafari			103,663
12	Hossein Karim Dadi			103,639
13	Gholamreza Sahebi			103,623
14	Mahdi Nasehi			101,667
15	Hossein Daemi			101,359
