= List of special economic zones =

This is a list of special economic zones by country.

== Africa ==
=== Botswana ===
Currently identified areas for SEZs are:

- Gaborone (adjacent to the Sir Seretse Khama International Airport)- International diamond hub
- Gaborone Fairgrounds- Financial Services in Gaborone.
- Lobatse- Beef, leather and biogas park.
- Greater Palapye in Palapye- Integrated coal value addition;
- Selebi Phikwe- Mineral beneficiation.
- Tuli Block- Horticulture, Agro Business:
- Francistown- Mining supplies, services and logistics hub.
- Pandamatenga- Integrated farming, agro business and food processing.

=== Democratic Republic of the Congo ===
Democratic Republic of the Congo planned to build its first Special Economic Zone in the Kinshasa district of N'Sélé. The SEZ was intended be operative in 2012 and dedicated to agro-industries.

As of April 2013 the DRC did not have any FTZs or free ports.

=== Egypt ===
The North West Suez Special Economic Zone (SSEZ) is located at the Red Sea, 45 km south of Suez. It is served by Sokhna harbour. It was the first SEZ set up under laws passed in 2002.

Additionally, in 2013 Egypt had nine FZs and thirteen Investment Zones.

=== Eswatini ===
The Royal Science and Technology Park (RSTP) was designated as a Special Economic Zone through the Special Economic Zone Act of 2018. This was an initiative by His Majesty King Mswati III to attract foreign investment into the Kingdom of Eswatini, promote export-oriented growth, generate employment with the intention to ensure technology transfer to the Eswatini populace, subsequently boost economic growth. The Investor Management Services Unit is responsible for the operationalization and management of RSTP’s SEZ Industrial Plot and the One Stop Shop Service Centre (OSSSC).

=== Ethiopia ===
Ethiopia has a SEZ named Oriental in Dukem (near Addis) that produces electrical machinery, construction materials, steel and metallurgy. The zone is wholly owned by China.

Kenya

Two Rivers International Finance & Innovation Centre (TRIFIC) is the first and only business services- focused Special Economic Zone (SEZ) in Kenya, offering new prospects for global, African, regional and Kenyan service-oriented enterprises and investment-focused entities seeking a next-frontier gateway base to competitively access regional and international markets.

=== Mauritius ===
A Chinese owned SEZ has been created in Jinfei called the Mauritius Jinfei Economic Trade and Cooperation Zone. The zone manufacturers textiles, garments, machinery and high-tech. Additionally, it supports trade, tourism and finance.

=== Nigeria ===
Two Chinese SEZs have been constructed in Nigeria.

- Centenary Economic City
- LADOL
- Nigeria International Commerce city

=== South Africa ===
- Atlantis SEZ, a green tech SEZ in the City of Cape Town
- Coega SEZ, an industrial SEZ near Gqeberha, in the Eastern Cape

=== Zambia ===
Zambia is home to two SEZs developed in partnership with China Non-Ferrous Metal Mining corporation. One sitting just outside Lusaka focuses on garments, food, appliances, tobacco and electronics. The second is in the copper rich town of Chambishi and focuses on copper related industries. The zones combine expedited customs and administration procedures with tax incentives, to attract increased investment.

== Americas ==
=== Cayman Islands ===
The Cayman Enterprise City SEZ officially launched on Friday, 3 February 2012. It specializes in knowledge based industries. The SEZ has a range of incentives to attract businesses including no corporate, income or capital gains tax.

=== Cuba ===
- The Mariel Special Development Zone, an SEZ in Cuba that is exempt from normal economic legislation

=== Honduras ===
Roatán contains a Zona de Empleo y de Desarrollo Económico (ZEDE) or Zone for Economic Development and Employment, designated by Honduran constitutional provisions and legislation. The goal is to enable stable legal structures, physical environment, human rights, and taxation in order to encourage investment, migration, and economic development. This is the location of the private charter city of Próspera.

=== Jamaica ===
- The Montego Bay Free Zone

=== Mexico ===
In May, 2016, President Enrique Peña Nieto signed a new law for the creation of special economic zones to attract investment into certain southern states of the country. The first of the zones are the port of Lázaro Cárdenas, including neighboring municipalities in Michoacán and Guerrero; a corridor in the Isthmus of Tehuantepec between Coatzacoalcos, Veracruz, and Salina Cruz, Oaxaca, that includes both those cities; and the Pacific coast port of Puerto Chiapas. In 2017 another zone is to be created in the petroleum corridor of Tabasco-Campeche.

According to Vázquez Tercero & Zepeda, the Mexican Special Economic Zones regime will provide tax benefits, customs, and business facilitation measures, and possibly financial support to investors. Moreover, the federal government, in coordination with State and local authorities, will also implement parallel policies in the region, such as education, security, health, and infrastructure, in order to boost the competitiveness of the geographic location as well as to attract investment.

=== Panama ===
The Colon Free Zone (C.F.Z.) is located in the city of Colon at the Atlantic entrance to the Panama Canal dedicated to re-export of merchandise to Latin America and the Caribbean.

The Panama Pacifico Special Economic Area (PPSEA) was passed into law in 2004 in the Republic of Panama. It is located on the former Howard AFB, near Panama City, on the Pacific side of the isthmus.

- Colón Free Trade Zone
- Panama Pacifico Special Economic Area

== Asia / Pacific ==
=== Bangladesh ===
Several special economic zones (SEZs) have been established across Bangladesh since the 1980s.

Mandated by the Bangladesh Economic Zones Act, 2010, the Bangladesh Economic Zones Authority (BEZA) was officially instituted by the government on 9 November 2010. BEZA aims to establish SEZs in all potential areas in Bangladesh including underdeveloped regions with a view to encouraging rapid economic development through increase and diversification of industry, employment, production and export.

Bangladesh government has taken an initiative to introduce a hundred SEZ throughout the country. As of March 2016, thirty seven government SEZs have acquired land and are under development.

The following Eight EPZs are in operation:

- Adamjee Export Processing Zone, Siddhirganj, Narayanganj
- Chittagong Export Processing Zone, South Halishahar, Chittagong
- Comilla Export Processing Zone, Comilla
- Dhaka Export Processing Zone, Savar, Dhaka
- Ishwardi Export Processing Zone, Ishwardi, Pabna
- Karnaphuli Export Processing Zone, North Patenga, Chittagong
- Mongla Export Processing Zone, Mongla, Bagerhat
- Uttara Export Processing Zone, Nilphamari

BEPZA is currently working on Mirsharai Economic Zone project to expand the opportunities for the investors to invest and create employment in a business-friendly environment.

=== Cambodia ===
Formally introduced in 2005, there are 22 SEZs in Cambodia as of November 2014. They are listed below followed by the province in which they are located.

1. Sihanoukville Special Economic Zone (SSEZ), Sihanoukville
2. Sihanoukville Port SEZ, Sihanoukville
3. Neang Kok Koh Kong SEZ, Koh Kong
4. Suoy Chheng SEZ, Koh Kong
5. S.N.C. SEZ, Sihanoukville
6. Stung Hav SEZ, Sihanoukville
7. N.L.C. SEZ, Svay Rieng
8. Manhattan (Svay Reing) SEZ, Svay Rieng
9. Poipet O’Neang SEZ, Banteay Meanchey
10. Doung Chhiv Phnom Den SEZ, Takeo
11. Phnom Penh SEZ, Phnom Penh
12. Kampot SEZ, Kampot
13. Sihanoukville SEZ 1, Sihanoukville
14. Tai Seng Bavet SEZ Svay Rieng
15. Oknha Mong SEZ, Koh Kong
16. Goldfame Pak Shun SEZ, Kandal
17. Thary Kampong Cham SEZ, Kampong Cham
18. Sihanoukville SEZ 2, Sihanoukville
19. D&M Bavet SEZ, Svay Rieng
20. Kiri Sakor Koh Kong SEZ, Koh Kong
21. Kampong Saom SEZ, Sihanoukville
22. Pacific SEZ, Svay Rieng

=== China ===
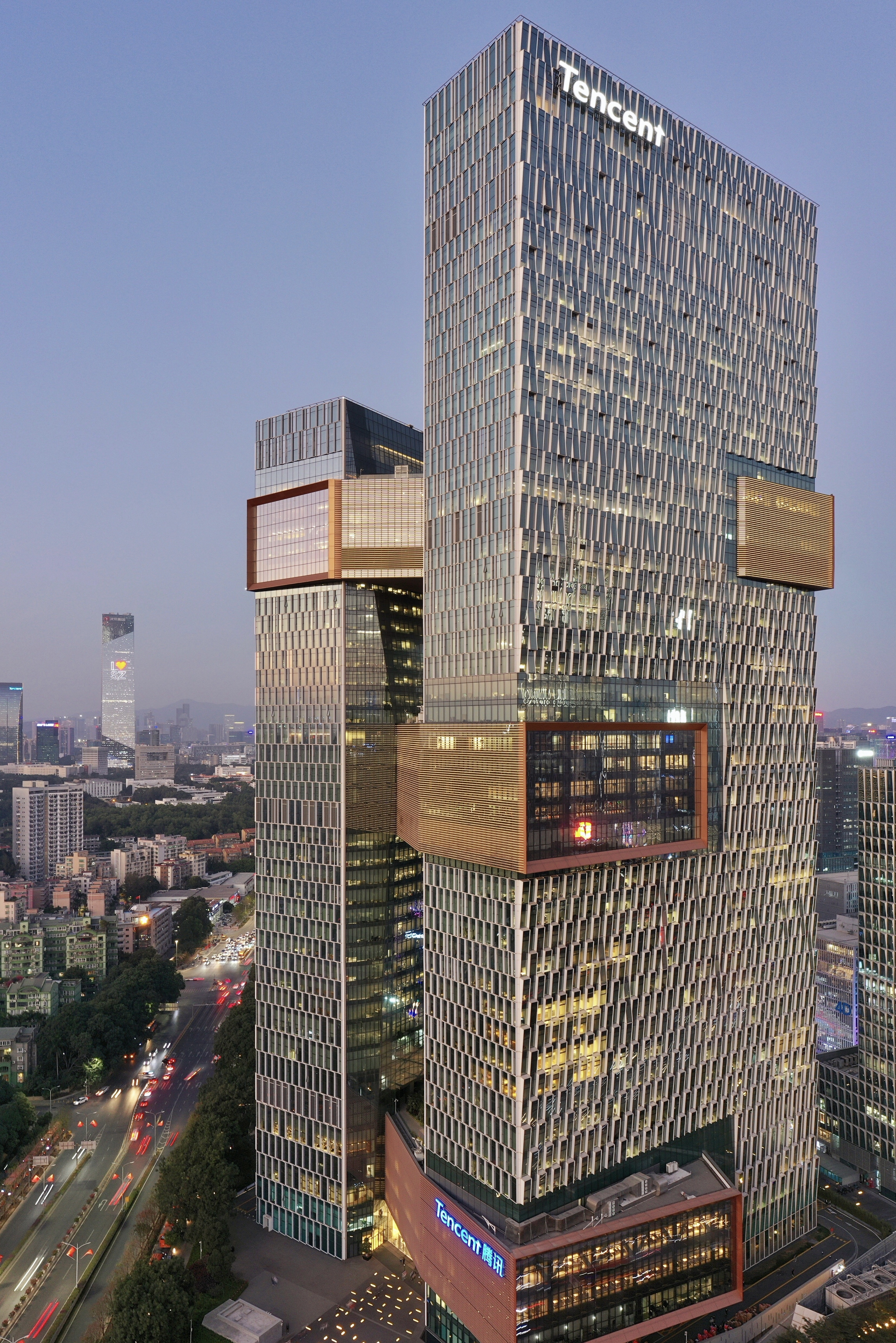
The Tencent Seafront Tower in Shenzhen, it is the Headquarters of the Tencent group.

The most prominent SEZs in the country are Hainan Province and the cities of Kashgar, Shantou, Shenzhen, Xiamen, and Zhuhai. It is notable that Shantou, Shenzhen, and Zhuhai are all in Guangdong Province, and all are on the southern coast of China where the sea is very accessible for transportation of goods.

=== India ===
There were about 143 SEZs (as of June 2012) operating throughout India, by February 2016 this had risen to 187. 634 SEZs have been approved for implementation by the Government of India (as of June 2012).

=== Indonesia ===
There are 25 Special Economic Zones in Indonesia that have been approved.

==== Approved ====
- Tanjung Lesung SEZ
- Sei Mangkei SEZ
- Palu SEZ
- Bitung SEZ
- Morotai SEZ
- Mandalika SEZ
- Maloy Batuta Trans Kalimantan SEZ (MBTK)
- Tanjung Kelayang SEZ
- Sorong SEZ
- Arun Lhokseumawe SEZ
- Galang Batang SEZ
- Singhasari SEZ
- Likupang SEZ
- Kendal SEZ
- Batam Aero Technic SEZ (BAT)
- Nongsa SEZ
- Lido SEZ
- Gresik SEZ
- Sanur SEZ
- Kura Kura Bali SEZ
- Tanjung Sauh SEZ
- Setangga SEZ
- Banten International Medical, Education, and Technology SEZ
- Batam International Medical and Tourism SEZ
- Batang Industropolis SEZ

==== Planned ====
- Bungku Green Industry SEZ
- Sidoarjo Halal Industry SEZ
- East Kutai Chemical Industry SEZ
- Patimban SEZ
- Subang SEZ
- Bulungan SEZ

=== Iran ===
Iran's interest in free trade and special economic zones can be traced back to the 1970s. According to SOAS's Hassan Hakimian, "the FTZs are more ambitious in their objective of acting as magnets for the attraction of Foreign Direct Investment (FDI) and ultimately for generating a diversified industrial base and promoting Iran's non-oil exports, the SEZ are conceived for goods transit and improving the supply and distribution networks in the country."

- Arg-e-Jadid Special Economic Zone: Vehicle Manufacturing Hub.
- PetZone: Petrochemical special economic Zone, Bandar-e Mahshahr.
- Kish: Kish island special economic zone.
- KSEZ(Kaveh special economic zone)
- Sarakhs Special Economic Zone
- Sirjan
- Shahid Rajaee Port
- Amirabad Special Economic Zone
- Bushehr Port
- Payam Special Economic Zone, the closest SEZ to the capital city of Tehran
- Abadan
- Astara
- The Persian Gulf Mining and Metal Industries Special Economic Zone

=== Laos ===
The Government Laos (Lao PDR) has promoted the development of Special Economic Zones (SEZs) since 2003, as a strategic tool to drive economic growth, attract foreign direct investment (FDI), and support the country's modernization efforts. As of 2025, there are 12 approved SEZs in the country.

While SEZs have contributed to infrastructure development and job creation, several projects have sparked controversy due to concerns over land rights, environmental impacts, and the socio-economic consequences for local communities, as well as allegations of illegal activities that may be occurring within some zones.

- Boten Beautiful Land Special Economic Zone (BSEZ), Luang Namtha Province
- Golden Triangle Special Economic Zone (GTSEZ), Bokeo Province
- Luang Prabang Special Economic Zone (LSEZ), Luang Prabang Province
- Saysettha Development Special Economic Zone (SDZ), Vientiane Capital
- Thatluang Lake Special Economic Zone (TLSEZ), Vientiane Capital
- Longthanh-Vientiane Special Economic Zone (LVSEZ), Vientiane Capital
- Dongphosy Special Economic Zone (DEZ), Vientiane Capital
- Vientiane Capital Industrial and Trade Area, Vientiane Capital
- Phoukhyo Special Economic Zone (PSEZ), Khammouan Province
- Thakheak Special Economic Zone (TSZ), Khammouan Province
- Savan-Seno Special Economic Zone (SSEZ), Savannakhet Province
- Champassak Special Economic Zone (CSEZ), Champassak Province

=== Malaysia ===
- East Coast Economic Region (ECER)
- Iskandar Malaysia (IM)
  - Johor-Singapore Special Economic Zone (JS-SEZ)
  - Forest City Special Financial Zone (SFZ)
- Malaysia Vision Valley (MVV)
- MSC Malaysia
- Northern Corridor Economic Region (NCER)

=== Myanmar ===
Special economic zones (Burmese: အထူးစီးပွားရေးဇုန်), which offer tax exemptions for different sectors (5 years for production, 8 years for high-tech, 2 years for agriculture, livestock breeding and forestry, and 1 year for banking) are undergoing preliminary construction in Sittwe Township and Kyaukpyu Township in Rakhine State. An international standard airport is also to be constructed. The six free trade zones will be Thilawa Port in Yangon, Mawlamyine in Mon State, Myawaddy and Hpa-an in Kayin State, Kyaukphyu in Rakhine State and Pyin Oo Lwin in Mandalay Region. According to the country's Special Economic Zone Law's Act 7, Section 36, homes and farming properties located on a proposed SEZ must be duly relocated and reimbursed.

The Myanmar Port Authority has been involved in facilitating contracts to develop Myanmar's Special Economic Zones, including a US$8.6 billion deal to develop a deep sea port at Dawei called the Dawei Port Project, by Italian-Thai Development).

=== Nepal ===
In Nepal SEZs laws were formulated in 2016 in the form of Special Economic Zone Act (2016). The laws were subsequently revised in 2019. The industries inside the Special Economic Zones are given various facilities and in return they have to commit to export a minimum of 60% of their production to the foreign market.

=== North Korea ===
The Rajin-Sonbong Economic Special Zone was established under a UN economic development programme in 1994. Located on the bank of the Tumen River, the zone borders on the Yanbian Korean Autonomous Prefecture (or, Yeonbyeon in Korean) of the People's Republic of China, as well as Russia. In 2000 the name of the area was shortened to Rason and became separate from the North Hamgyeong Province. In 2013 and 2014 a number of smaller special economic zones were announced covering export handling, mineral processing, high technology, gaming and tourism.

North Korea also used to operate Kaesong Industrial Region in conjunction with South Korea from 2002 until 2016.

The State Academy of Sciences operates a special economic zone near Unjong Park in the northern suburbs of Pyongyang.

North Korea designated over a dozen new special economic zones in 2013 and 2014.

=== Pakistan ===
Taking the example of the Chinese success with their SEZs, China is helping Pakistan develop the RUBA SEZ on the outskirts of Lahore. RUBA SEZ PVT LTD is a subsidiary of RUBA Group of Companies and was expanded from existing Haier – RUBA Economic Zone.

Other economic zones include the China-Pakistan economic zone open only to Chinese investors in Gwadar, Pakistan.

There are talks of creating a Japanese city for investors from Japan only.

There has been new SEZ proposed on the under-construction Sialkot-Lahore motorway; Qatar has proposed an investment for $1 billion in a new SEZ along the motorway.

There is a new zone under construction in Faisalabad, which will be the biggest industrial estate of Pakistan when complete. It has sections for each country and the first phase is complete with a special Chinese zone in it.

Special economic zones in Pakistan:

- Karachi Export Processing Zone, Karachi, Sindh
- Risalpur Export Processing Zone, Risalpur
- Sialkot Export Processing Zone, Sialkot, Punjab
- Gujranwala Export Processing Zone, Gujranwala, Punjab
- Khairpur Special Economic Zone, Khairpur, Sindh
- Rashakai Special Economic Zone, Rashakai, Khyber Pakhtunkhwa
- Gadoon Special Economic Zone, Swabi, Khyber Pakhtunkhwa
- Shaheed Benazir Bhutto Special Industrial Zone, Benazirabad
- Hathar Special Economic Zone, Haripur, Khyber Pakhtunkhwa
- Quaid e Azam Business Park, Sheikhupura, Punjab
- Gwadar Special Economic Zone, Gwadar, Balochistan

=== Philippines ===
Some of the over 200 SEZs in the Philippines include:

- Subic Bay Metropolitan Authority (76.59 hectares)
- Clark Special Economic Zone (29,365 hectares)
- Freeport Area of Bataan (1,742.48 hectares)
- PHIVIDEC Industrial Authority
- Zamboanga City Special Economic Zone Authority
- Cagayan Special Economic Zone
- Aurora Pacific Economic Zone and Freeport Authority (APECO)
- Light Industry & Science Park I, II, & III (272.22 hectares)
- Laguna Technopark (289.95 hectares)
- Laguna International Industrial Park (34.88 hectares)
- Hermosa Ecozone Industrial Park (142.04 hectares)
- Keppel Philippines Marine Special Economic Zone (22.92 hectares)
- Filinvest Technology Park - Calamba (51.07 hectares)
- Carmelray Industrial Park I&II - Calamba (CIP I 60.86 hectares; CIP II 143.03 hectares)

=== Russia ===
Russia currently has 16 federal economic zones and several regional projects.

As of March 2010 Russia's federal special economic zones host 207 investors from 18 countries. There are major MNCs among investors to Russia's SEZ, such as Yokohama, Cisco, Isuzu, Air Liquide, Bekaert, Rockwool and many others.

Russia's 15 existing and to-be federal special economic zones are managed by OJSC "Special Economic Zones".

OJSC "SEZ" was founded in 2006 to accumulate and implement world's best practices in developing and managing SEZ and promote Foreign direct investment (FDI) in the Russian economy. It is fully owned and funded by the Russian state.

Federal economic zones in Russia are regulated by Federal Law # 116 FZ issued on July 22, 2005.

==== Technical/Innovational Zones ====
- Dubna
- Zelenograd (Moscow)
  - Area Alabushevo
  - Area MIET
- Saint Petersburg
  - Area Neudorf (Russian: Нойдорф) - area in Strelna near Saint Petersburg
  - Area Novo-Orlovskoye (Russian: Ново-Орловское) - area in Saint Petersburg
- Tomsk
  - Area North
  - Area South
- Innopolis Special Economic Zone in the city of Innopolis

==== Industrial/developmental Zones ====
- “Alabuga” (special economic zone)
- Lipetsk
- SEZ Togliatti
- SEZ Titanium Valley"

==== Tourist Zones ====
- Krasnodar Krai
- Stavropol Krai
- Kaliningrad Oblast (Yantar, Kaliningrad Special Economic Zone)
- Altai Krai
- Altai Republic
- Irkutsk Oblast
- Buryatia
- Vladivostok

=== Saudi Arabia ===
The Red Sea Project, a luxury tourist destination currently under construction, will "operate as a Special Economic Zone with its own laws and regulatory framework, specially created to encourage investment opportunities and commercial activities".

The Saudi government announced the creation of four new Special Economic Zones (SEZs) in various parts of the nation in 2023.

List of SEZs in Saudi Arabia:

- King Abdullah Economic City (KAEC) SEZ
- Jazan SEZ
- Ras Al Khair SEZ
- Cloud Computing SEZ, King Abdulaziz City for Science and Technology (KACST)

=== South Korea ===
Korean FEZs are designated by law to facilitate foreign investment, and thereby to strengthen national competitiveness and seek balanced development among regions by improving the business environment for foreign-invested enterprises and living conditions for foreigners.

There are eight Free Economic Zones in South Korea. The first three zones were created in 2003 and three more were created in 2008. In 2013, the East Coast and Chungbuk Economic Zones were declared.

1. Incheon Free Economic Zone (IFEZ) in 2003
2. Busan-Jinhae Free Economic Zone (BJFEZ) in 2004
3. Gwangyang Free Economic Zone (GFEZ) in 2004
4. Saemangeum Free Economic Zone (SGFEZ) in 2008
5. Yellow Sea Free Economic Zone (YESFEZ) in 2008
6. Daegu-Gyeongbuk Free Economic Zone (DGFEZ) in 2008
7. East Coast Free Economic Zone (EFEZ) in 2013
8. Chungbuk Free Economic Zone (CBFEZ) in 2013

=== Sri Lanka ===
- Port City Colombo

=== Thailand ===
Thailand has SEZs in the following provinces:

- Bordering Cambodia

- Sa Kaeo Province
- Trat Province

- Bordering Laos

- Chiang Rai Province
- Mukdahan Province
- Nakhon Phanom Province
- Nong Khai Province

- Bordering Malaysia

- Narathiwat Province
- Songkhla Province

- Bordering Myanmar

- Kanchanaburi Province
- Tak Province

=== Uzbekistan ===
- Navoi Free Industrial Economic Zone - The Navoi Free Industrial Economic Zone was created on December 2, 2008 in the Navoi region of the Republic of Uzbekistan to attract foreign investment.
- Jizzakh high-tech industrial park - Uzbekistan and China are working together to jointly establish a SEZ in the central Uzbek city Jizzakh. This high-tech industrial park will be formally established by March 2013. China Development Bank will provide a $50 million loan to finance several of the joint projects in the construction, agro-industrial and mechanical engineering sectors.

== Europe ==
=== Belarus ===
Belarus has a SEZ called the China-Belarus Industrial Park.

=== Latvia ===
Liepaja Special Economic Zone in Baltics consisting of sea-port, industrial area and international airport.

Rezekne Special Economic Zone in Baltics with crossroads of transport corridors in Latvia with direct access to international markets with more than 500 million consumers in the EU, Russia and CIS countries.

=== Poland ===
There are fourteen SEZs in Poland.

Special economic zones (SSE is shortcut of Specjalna Strefa Ekonomiczna) in Poland:

- Kamienna Góra SEZ for Small Business (Kamiennogórska SSE Małej Przedsiębiorczości)
- Katowice SEZ (Katowicka SSE)
- Kostrzyń-Słubice SEZ (Kostrzyńsko-Słubicka SSE)
- Kraków Technology Park (Krakowski Park Technologiczny)
- Legnica SEZ (Legnicka SSE)
- Łódź SEZ (Łódzka SSE)
- SEZ EURO-PARK MIELEC (SSE Euro-Park Mielec)
- Pomeranian SEZ (Pomorska SSE)
- Słupsk SEZ (Słupska SSE)
- Starachowice SEZ (SSE Starachowice)
- Suwałki SEZ (Suwalska SSE)
- Tarnobrzeg SEZ (Tarnobrzeska SSE)
- Wałbrzych SEZ "INVEST-PARK" (Wałbrzyska SSE)
- Warmian-Masurian SEZ (Warmińsko-Mazurska SSE)

=== Spain ===
- The Canary Islands Special Zone

=== Ukraine ===
Special Economic Zones existed in Ukraine until March 31, 2005. The first created was the Nouth-Crimean Experimental Economic Zone Syvash (since 1996). From 1998 to 2000 11 new zones were created.

Name	Location	Area	Established	Time limit*
Slavutych	Slavutych, Kyiv Oblast	2,000 ha	30.06.1998	until 01.01.2020
Azov	Mariupol, Donetsk Oblast	315 ha	21.07.1998	60 years
Donetsk	Donetsk, Donetsk Oblast	466 ha	21.07.1998	60 years
Zakarpattia	Uzhhorodskyi Raion and Mukachivskyi Raion, Zakarpattia Oblast	737 ha	09.01.1999	30 years
Yavoriv	Yavorivskyi Raion, Lviv Oblast	116,000 ha	17.02.1999	until 01.01.2020
Interport Kovel	Kovel, Volyn Oblast	57 ha	01.01.2000	20 years
Kurortopolis Truskavets	Truskavets, Lviv Oblast	774 ha	01.01.2000	20 years
Mykolaiv	Mykolaiv, Mykolaiv Oblast, shipyard territory, and adjoining area	865 ha	01.01.2000	30 years
Porto-Franco	Odesa, part of Odesa Trade Sea Port's territory	32 ha	01.01.2000	25 years
Reni	Reni, Odesa Oblast	94 ha	17.05.2000	30 years
* Initially planned time of operation given. All zones were shut down on March 31, 2005. NCEEZ — Nouth-Crimean Experimental Economic Zone. Sources: and Пехник А.В., Іноземні інвестиції в економіку України. Навчальний посібник, Вид. «Знання», Київ 2007, pages: 49, 310–319

== See also ==
- List of ports
- List of railroads
- Open Balkan
- Craiovia Group
- CEFTA
