= Regions of Thailand =

Six-region division system

Four-region division system

Meteorological division system

Thailand is variably divided into different sets of regions, the most notable of which are the six-region grouping used in geographic studies, and the four-region grouping consistent with the Monthon administrative regional grouping system formerly used by the Ministry of Interior. These regions are the largest subdivisions of the country.

In contrast to the administrative divisions of the provinces of Thailand, the regions no longer have an administrative character, but are used for statistical or academic purposes.

== Grouping systems ==
A six-region system is commonly used for geographical and scientific purposes. This system dates to 1935. It was formalised in 1977 by the National Geographical Committee, which was appointed by the National Research Council. It divides the country into the following regions:

- Northern Thailand
- Northeastern Thailand
- Western Thailand
- Central Thailand
- Eastern Thailand
- Southern Thailand

The four-region system, used in some administrative and statistical contexts, and also as a loose cultural grouping, includes the western and eastern regions within the central region, while grouping the provinces of Sukhothai, Phitsanulok, Phichit, Kamphaeng Phet, Phetchabun, Nakhon Sawan, and Uthai Thani in the northern region. This is also the regional system most commonly used on national television, when discussing regional events. It divides the country into the following regions:

- Northern Thailand
- Northeastern Thailand (Isan)
- Central Thailand
- Southern Thailand

The Thai Meteorological Department divides the country into six regions for meteorological purposes. It differs from the four-region system in that the east is regarded as a separate region, the south is divided into east and west coasts, and Nakhon Sawan and Uthai Thani are grouped in the central region.

=== Comparison ===
Provinces	Six-region (geographical)	Four-region (political)	Six-region (meteorological)
Amnat Charoen, Bueng Kan, Buri Ram, Chaiyaphum, Kalasin, Khon Kaen, Loei, Maha Sarakham, Mukdahan, Nakhon Phanom, Nakhon Ratchasima, Nong Bua Lamphu, Nong Khai, Roi Et, Sakon Nakhon, Si Sa Ket, Surin, Ubon Ratchathani, Udon Thani, Yasothon	Northeastern	Northeastern	Northeastern
Chiang Mai, Chiang Rai, Lampang, Lamphun, Mae Hong Son, Nan, Phayao, Phrae, Uttaradit	Northern	Northern	Northern
Tak	Western	Northern	Northern
Kamphaeng Phet, Phetchabun, Phichit, Phitsanulok, Sukhothai	Central	Northern	Northern
Nakhon Sawan, Uthai Thani	Central	Northern	Central
Ang Thong, Bangkok, Chai Nat, Lop Buri, Nakhon Pathom, Nonthaburi, Pathum Thani, Phra Nakhon Si Ayutthaya, Samut Prakan, Samut Sakhon, Samut Songkhram, Saraburi, Sing Buri, Suphan Buri	Central	Central	Central
Nakhon Nayok	Central	Central	Eastern
Chachoengsao, Chanthaburi, Chon Buri, Prachin Buri, Rayong, Sa Kaeo, Trat	Eastern	Central	Eastern
Kanchanaburi, Ratchaburi	Western	Central	Central
Phetchaburi, Prachuap Khiri Khan	Western	Central	Southern, East Coast
Chumphon, Nakhon Si Thammarat, Narathiwat, Pattani, Phatthalung, Songkhla, Surat Thani, Yala	Southern	Southern	Southern, East Coast
Krabi, Phang Nga, Phuket, Ranong, Satun, Trang	Southern	Southern	Southern, West Coast

== Regional economic disparities ==
Thailand's economic activities are concentrated in Bangkok and the central region. In 2013, the central region's gross regional product (GRP) contributed 40.9 percent to Thailand's GDP. Other regions accounted for 10.9 percent (northeastern); 8.8 percent (northern); and 8.6 percent (southern). GRP per capita varied. The average GRP per capita of the central region was 280,734 baht, while that of the northeastern region was 74,532 baht.

== Human Development Regions ==
This is a list of the 4 Thai regions and the capital city of Bangkok by Human Development Index as of 2025 with data for the year 2023.

Rank	Region	HDI (2023)
Very High Human Development
1	Bangkok	0.833
2	Central Thailand (excluding Bangkok)	0.808
High Human Development
	Thailand	0.798
3	Southern Thailand	0.786
4	Northern Thailand	0.782
5	Northeastern Thailand	0.779

== See also ==
- List of countries by Human Development Index
- List of regions of Vietnam
- Organization of the government of Thailand
- Regions of Indonesia
