= Rayong (disambiguation) =

Rayong is a city located in the Gulf of Thailand. The name may also refer to:

- Rayong Province
- Amphoe Mueang Rayong or Mueang Rayong district
- Rayong River
