= Ko Samet =

Island in the Gulf of Thailand

Native name: เกาะเสม็ด
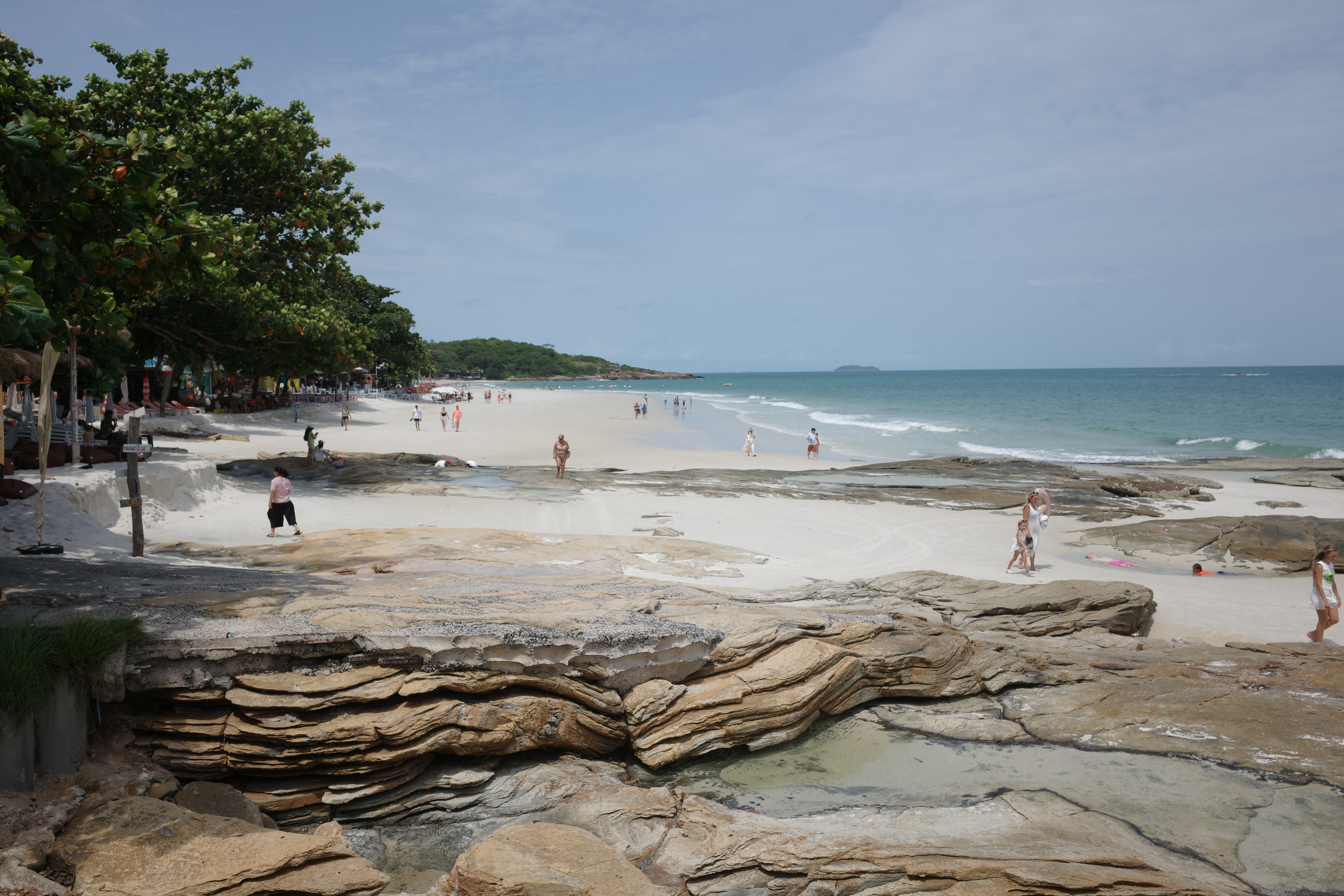
- A beach on Ko Samet

- Location in Thailand

Geography
- Location: Gulf of Thailand
- Coordinates: 12°34′4″N 101°27′17″E
- Area: 13.1 km^{2} (5.1 sq mi)
- Length: 6.8 km (4.23 mi)
- Width: 4 km (2.5 mi)

Administration
- Thailand
- Province: Rayong
- District: Mueang Rayong
- Subdistrict: Phe
- Largest settlement: Na Dan

Ko Samet (Cajeput Island; Thai: เกาะเสม็ด, Thai pronunciation: [kɔ̀ʔ samèt]) is an island in the Gulf of Thailand off the coast of Rayong Province on the eastern seaboard of Thailand, approximately 220 kilometres (140 mi) southeast of Bangkok. It is part of the Phe (Thai: เพ) Subdistrict of Mueang Rayong District, the capital district of Rayong Province. Ko Samet is the largest and westernmost of a cluster of islands lying not far from the coast. The island measures 6.8 kilometres (4.2 mi) from north to south and, at its closest point, lies 2.6 kilometres (1.6 mi) south of the mainland; the actual travelling distance from the main commercial tourist pier in the town of Ban Phe to the island's nearest beach is about 10 kilometres (6.2 mi). The island takes its name from the cajeput tree (Thai: เสม็ด, romanized: samet), which grows abundantly on its forested hills.

Most of the island, excluding the port settlement of Na Dan, has formed part of Khao Laem Ya–Mu Ko Samet National Park since 1981, when the Royal Forest Department declared the Samet archipelago, nine other small islands, the headland of Khao Laem Ya, and the 11-kilometre (6.8 mi) Mae Ramphueng Beach a national park. The island is popular with foreign tourists and as a weekend getaway for residents of Bangkok, and tourism dominates its economy.

== History ==
=== Early history and settlement ===
Ko Samet appears in Thai literature of the early Rattanakosin period: the poet Sunthorn Phu (1786–1855) set part of his epic poem Phra Aphai Mani on the island's shores. The island's permanent population settled there over subsequent generations, generally without formal title to the land. An investigation by the National Human Rights Commission found that many islanders were descended from people who had lived along old Siam's eastern border and fled in the wake of the Franco-Siamese War of 1893, while other early settlers came to the island seeking refuge or a fresh start.

=== Tourism and national park designation ===
The first tourists, backpackers content with modest accommodation, began arriving in the early 1970s and mingled with the islanders. Although the beauty of Ko Samet had been known to Bangkok residents for decades, the Thai government restricted overnight stays on the island until 1981. On 1 October of that year, the Royal Forest Department declared Ko Samet and its environs, together with the Khao Laem Ya headland on the mainland, to be Khao Laem Ya–Mu Ko Samet National Park. Resort development nevertheless accelerated in the decades that followed, and the ambiguous legal status of land on the island gave rise to long-running disputes among long-time residents, resort developers, the Treasury Department, and the park authorities.

=== 21st century ===
In the 2010s, the authorities began taking stronger action against illegal construction within the national park, halting work on an unauthorised pier and partially demolishing several resorts. After the courts ruled that three resorts (Ploy Samet, Muk Samet, and Unseen) had been built illegally on park land, more than 500 national park officials were deployed in August 2013 to demolish them. In 2016, the Department of National Parks identified a further 24 resorts as encroaching on park land; thirteen agreed to close, while the remainder contested the findings, citing land leases issued by the Treasury Department.

Environmental measures have also been introduced. In November 2018, park authorities launched a campaign barring visitors from bringing single-use plastic bags and polystyrene foam containers onto the island; at the time, Ko Samet received about 1,500 visitors a day, each using an average of eight plastic bags. In April 2022, the Department of National Parks banned styrofoam packaging and single-use plastics, including bags, food containers, cups, straws, and cutlery, from all of Thailand's national parks, including Khao Laem Ya–Mu Ko Samet.

== Geography and climate ==
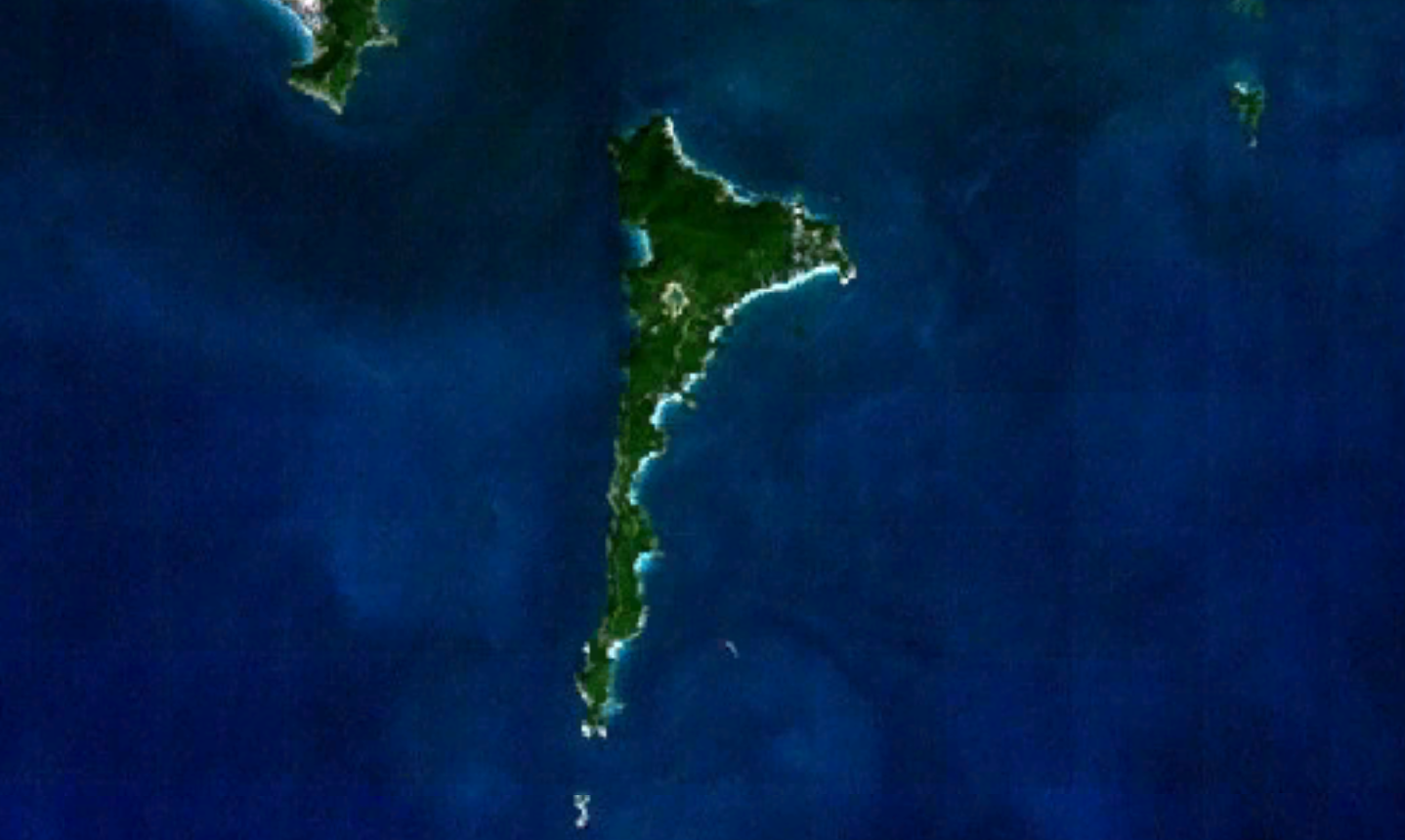
Ko Samet from space

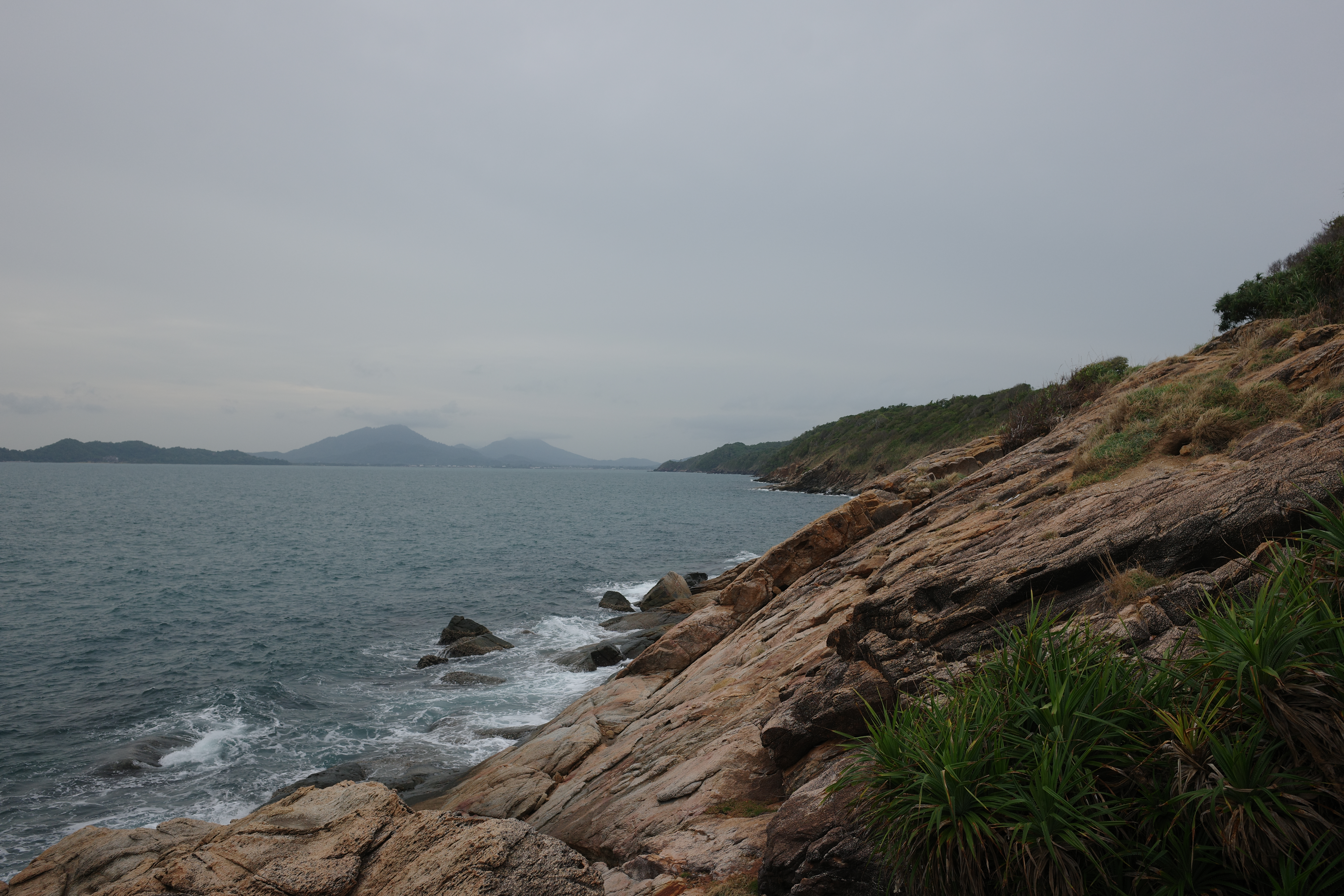
View over the coastline of Ko Samet

Located 220 km (140 mi) from the capital in the Gulf of Thailand, Ko Samet is approximately 13.1 km^{2} (5.1 sq mi) in size and shaped somewhat like the letter "t". Along the length of the "t" (north–south) the island measures approximately 7 km (4.3 mi), and it measures 4 km (2.5 mi) across the "t" (west–east). Forests blanket up to 80 percent of the total area.

Closest to the mainland lies the small island port village of Na Dan, commonly known as Ko Samet Village, with its nearby beach, Hat Sai Kaeo (Glass Sand Beach; Thai: หาดทรายแก้ว), the longest beach on Ko Samet. Most of the island's beaches lie along its eastern shore, among them Ao Phai and Ao Wong Duean, while Ao Phrao is the principal beach on the western shore. Just off the southern tip of the island are three small rock islands: Ko Chan (Moon Island; Thai: เกาะจันทร์), Ko San Chalam (Shark Fin Island), and Hin Khao (White Rock; Thai: เกาะหินขาว).

Ko Samet is one of the driest archipelagos in Thailand and receives significantly less rainfall than mainland Rayong Province, even though it lies only a few kilometres offshore. The island's rainy season extends only from May to July, and even during this period it receives less rain than most other Thai islands. Despite the low rainfall, the island consists of lush forested hills covered with evergreen and deciduous forest, and cajeput trees grow abundantly. The island has no natural freshwater source, and potable water must be brought in from the mainland or collected from rain with the exception of the central reservoir.

== Administration ==
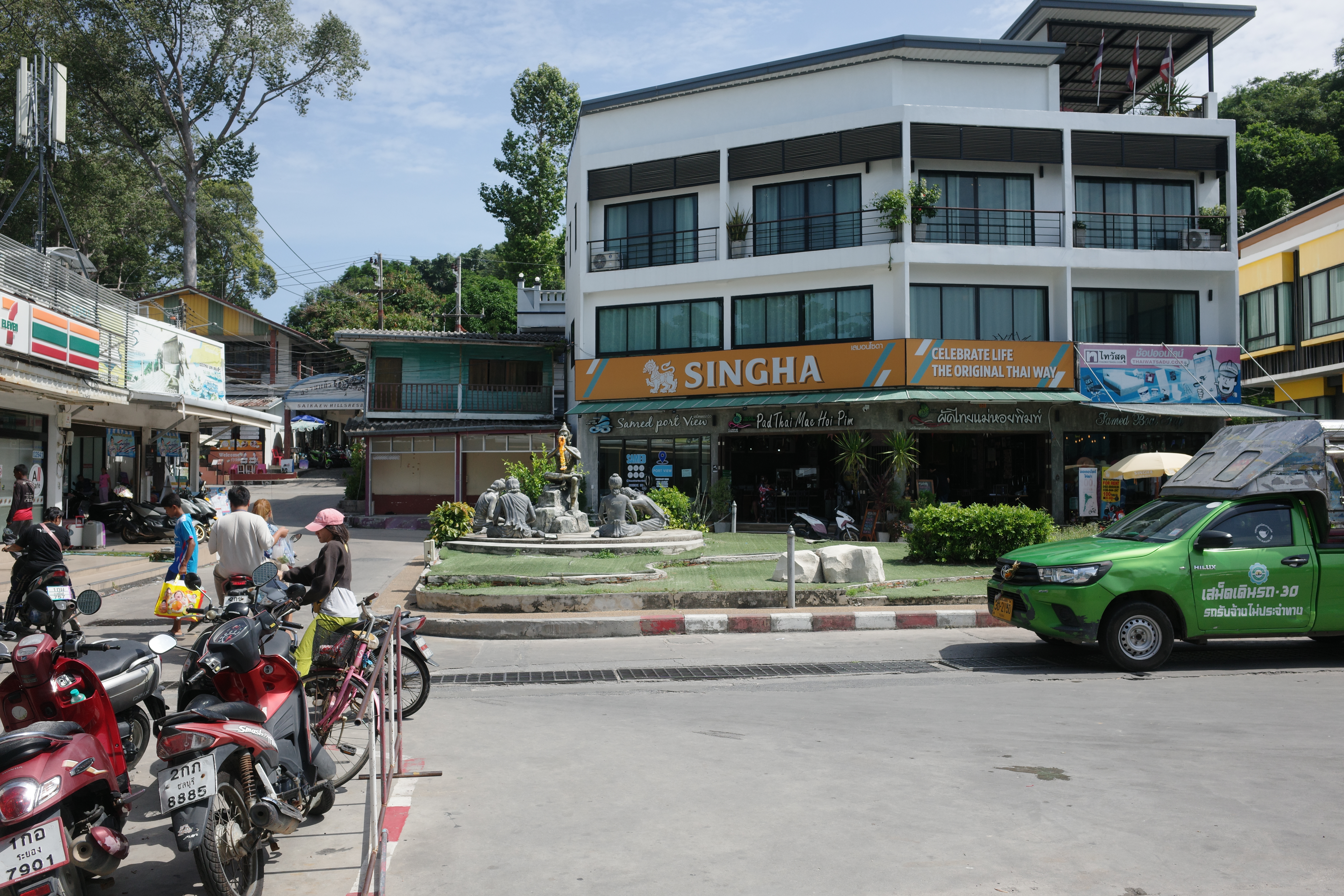
Town square on Ko Samet

Ko Samet is administered by the Phe Subdistrict of Mueang Rayong District, Rayong Province. Most of the island also falls within Khao Laem Ya–Mu Ko Samet National Park, which additionally encompasses the nearby islands of Ko Man Klang, Ko Kudee, Ko Man Nok, and Ko Man Nai, and is administered by the Department of National Parks, Wildlife and Plant Conservation. All visitors are required to pay a one-off national park entry fee upon arrival; foreign visitors are charged 200 baht per adult, a higher rate than that applied to Thai nationals.

== Economy and tourism ==
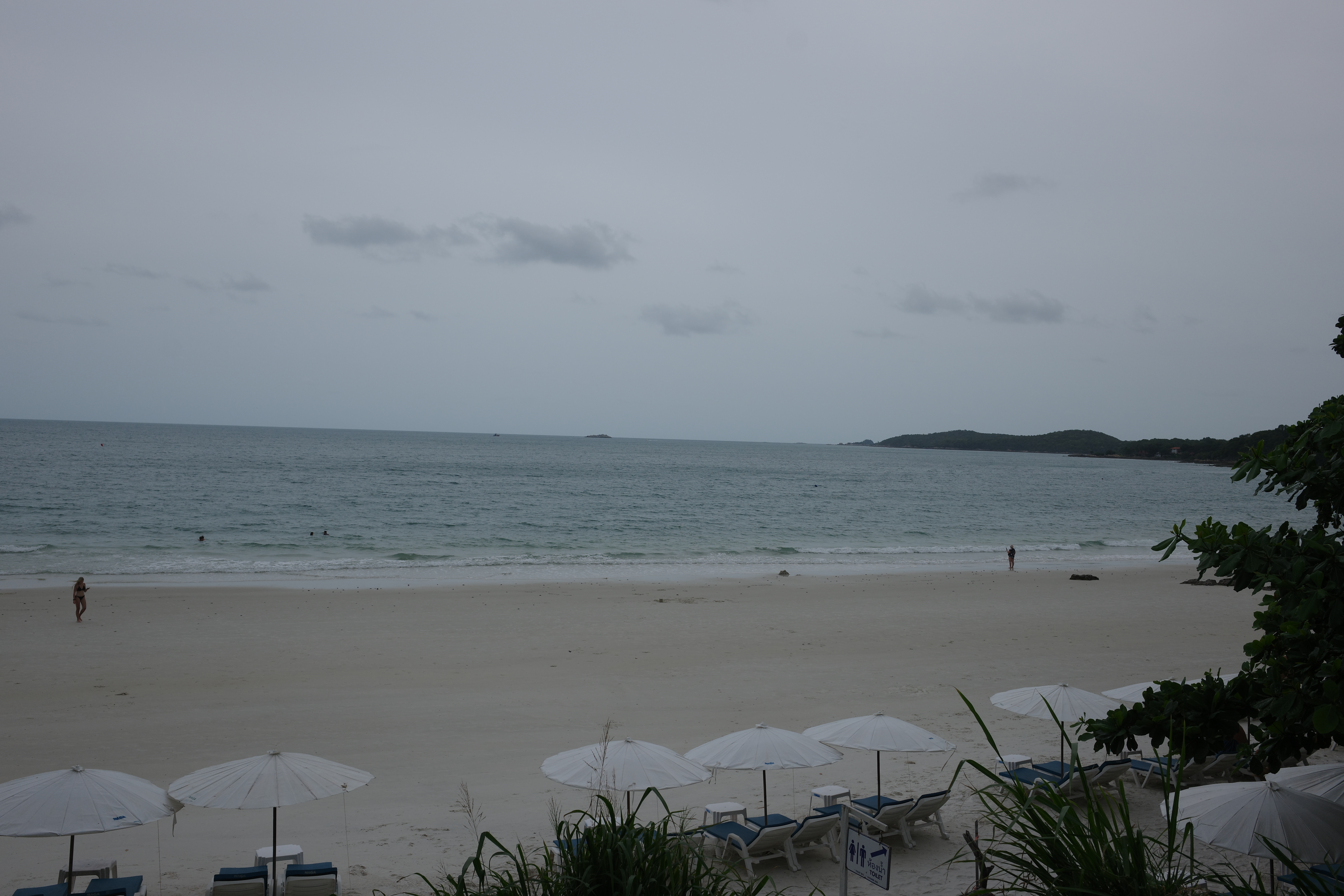
One of the island's east-coast beaches

Tourism is the mainstay of the island's economy. Ko Samet is a popular weekend getaway for Thai and foreign residents of Bangkok, and beach resorts, restaurants, and bars line most of its beaches; camping is also permitted within the national park area. The most developed beaches lie along the east coast, while more secluded, upscale resorts are found on the west coast. As of 2026, the island had approximately 3,000 hotel rooms.

The village of Na Dan serves as the island's commercial centre, with shops, restaurants and cafés, motorcycle-rental services, a clinic, a police station, and convenience stores, including a 7-Eleven branch near the main pier.

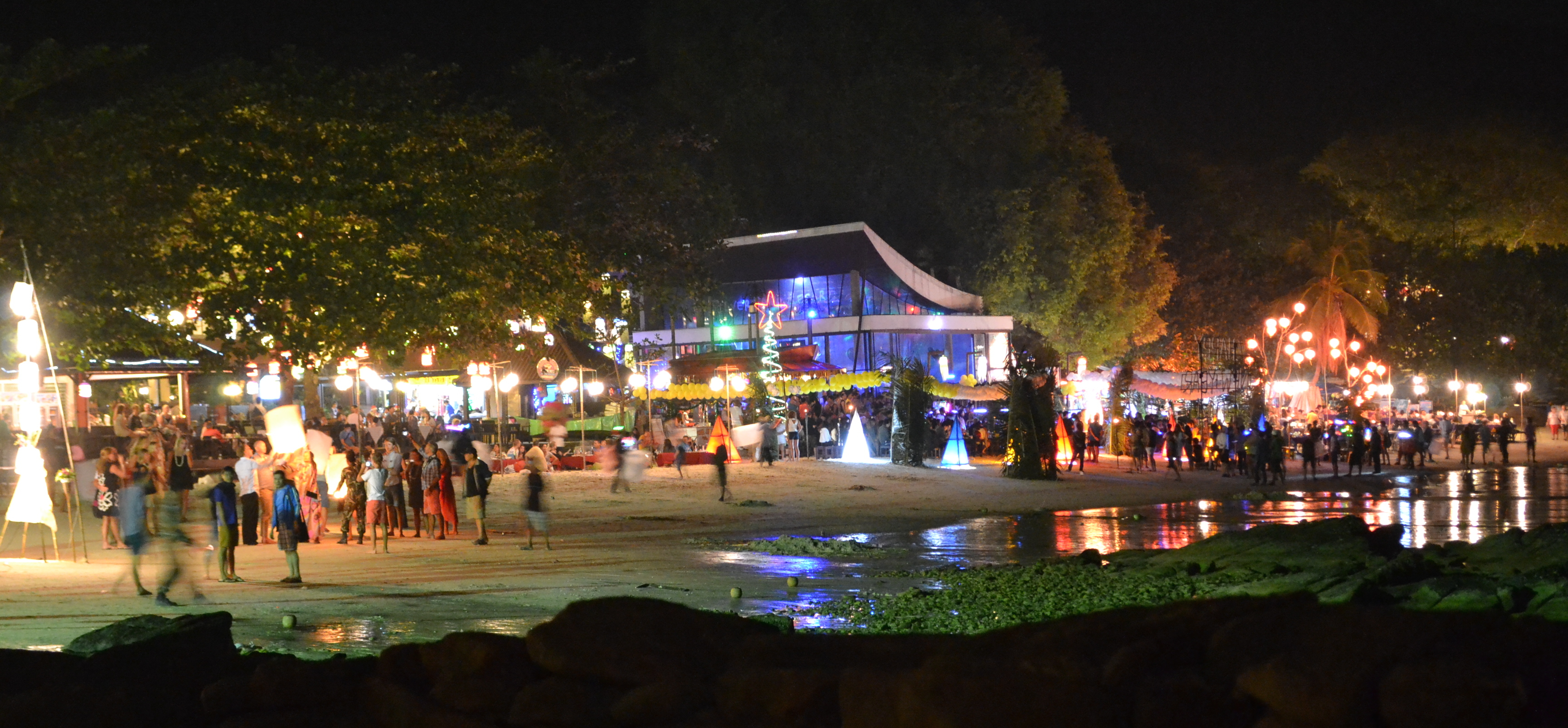
A Ko Samet beach at night

Ko Samet also hosts the "Samed in Love" beachside music festival, which draws thousands of visitors to the island.

== Transport ==
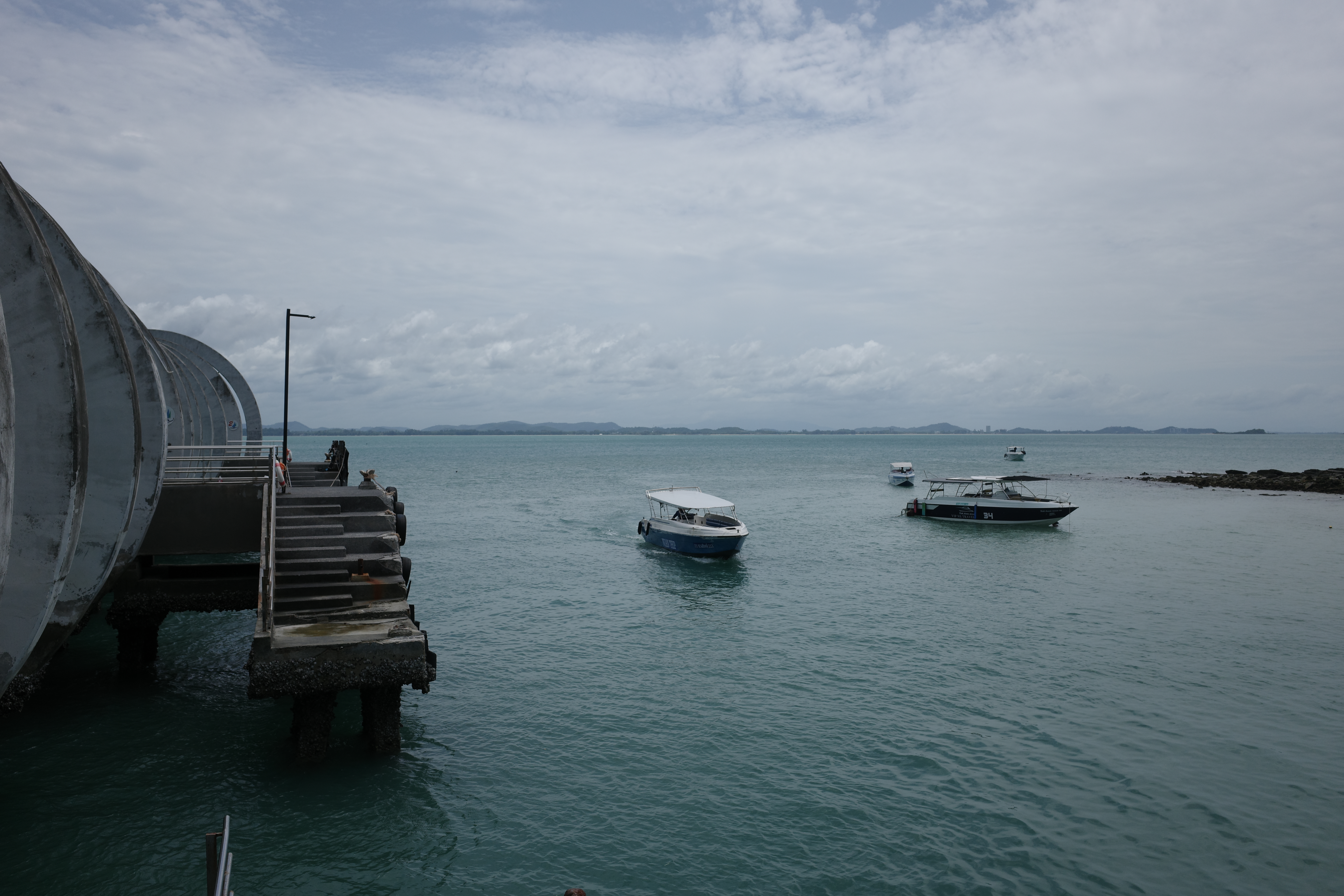
Boats at Na Dan Pier, the island's main passenger port connecting Ko Samet to the mainland

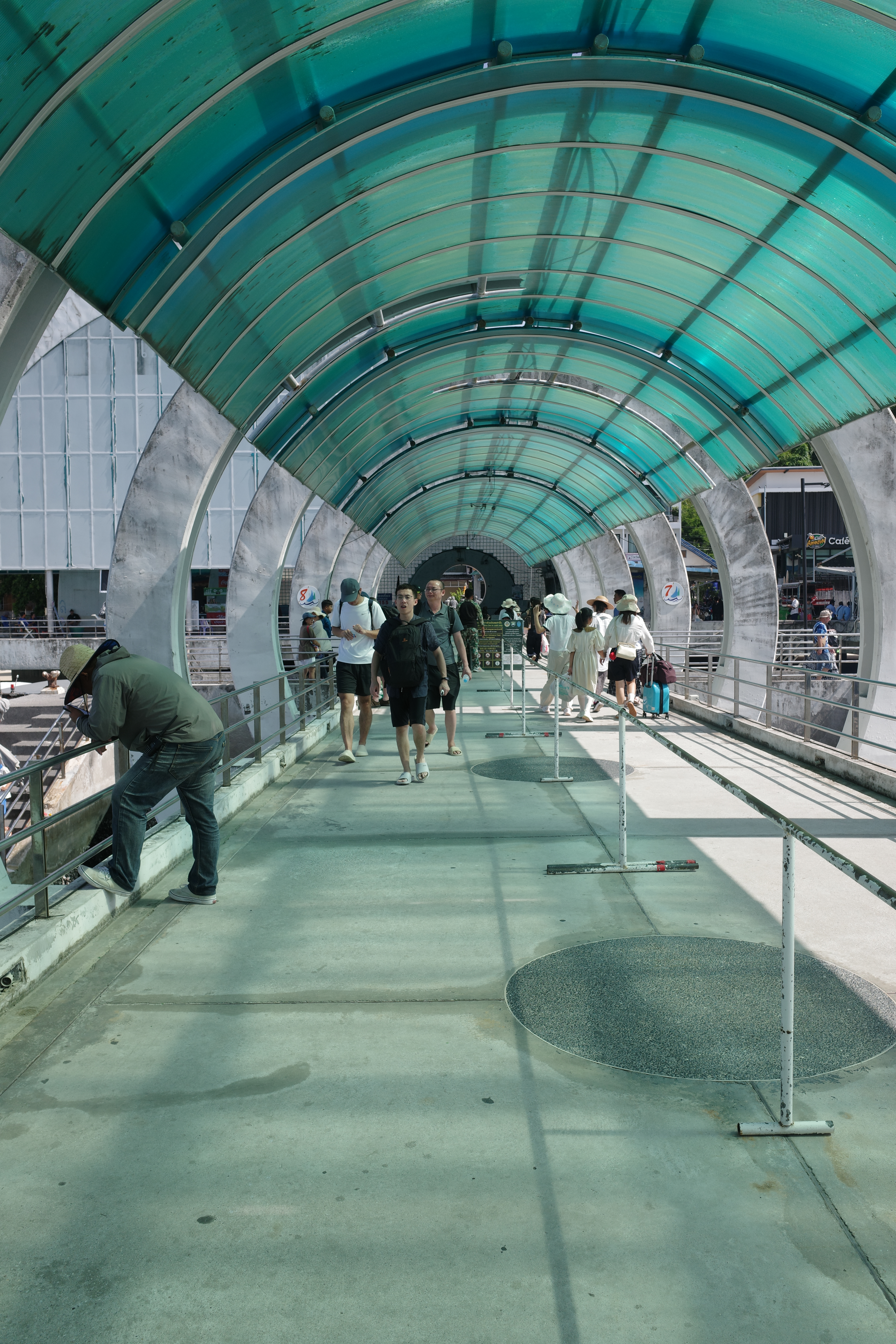
Entrance to Na Dan Pier

Ko Samet is reached by ferry and speedboat from Ban Phe on the mainland. Ferries take about 40 minutes to reach Na Dan, the island's main passenger port on the northeastern coast, while speedboats can carry passengers directly to individual beaches in around 10 minutes. Smaller piers at Ao Phrao, Ao Wong Duean, Ao Thian, and Ao Wai serve resort transfers, diving trips, and excursion boats.

There are two main arteries on Ko Samet: the northern route connects Hat Sai Kaeo to Ao Klang and Ao Noina, while the central route consists of four smaller roads. The first road links Hat Sai Kaeo to Ao Phai and Ao Phutsa; the second connects the centre of the island to Ao Wong Duean; the third connects the first road to Ao Thapthim and Ao Nuan; and the fourth connects the first road to Ao Phrao.

Private cars are uncommon on the island. Transport is largely limited to songthaews (shared pickup taxis), which are the chief means of public transport, and rented motorcycles; many visitors also travel between the east-coast beaches on foot.

== In popular culture ==
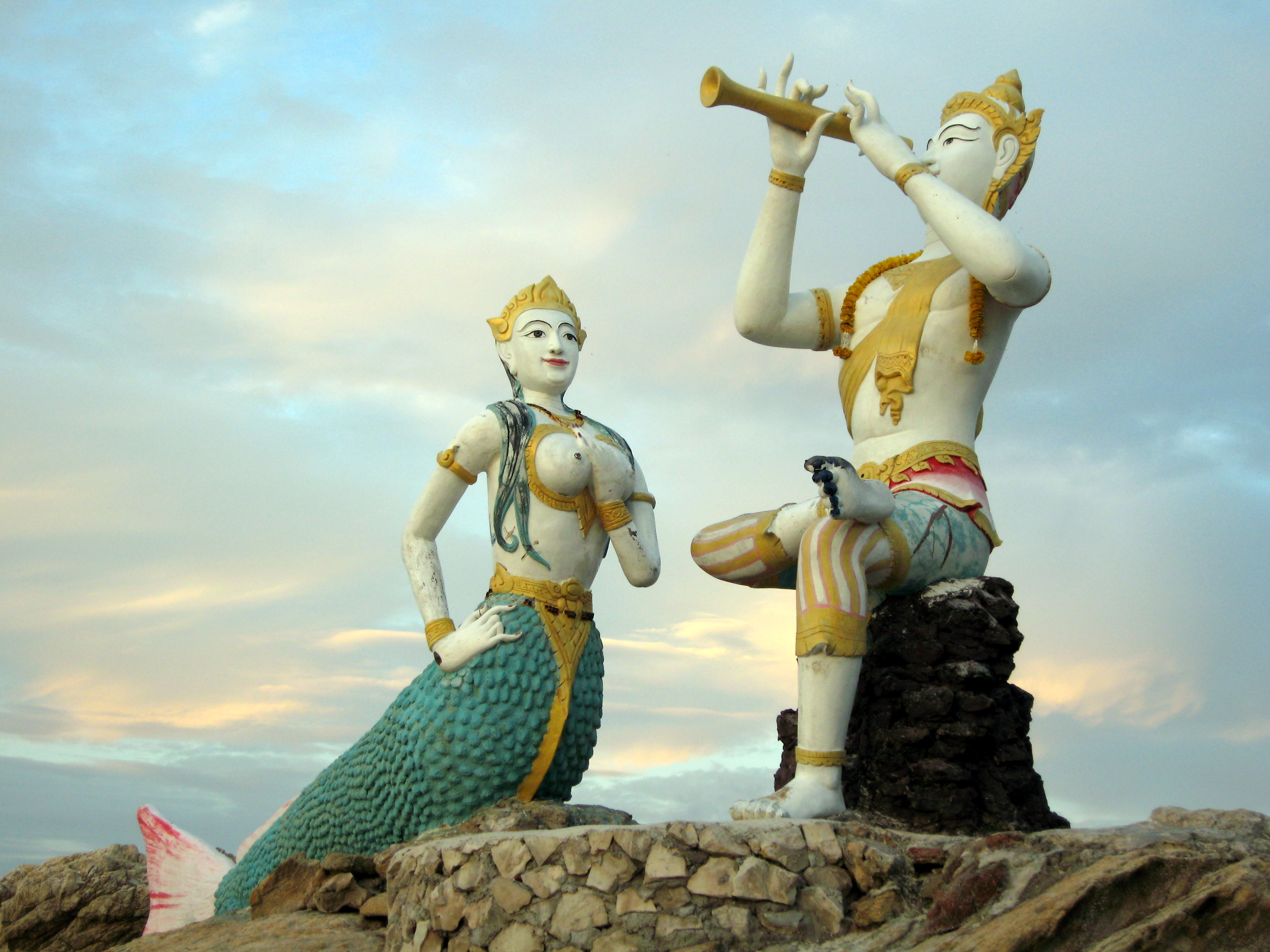
Statue of Aphai Mani and the mermaid, Hat Sai Kaeo Beach

The island's association with Sunthorn Phu's Phra Aphai Mani (sometimes transliterated as Pra Apaimanee) is commemorated on Hat Sai Kaeo Beach, where statues depict the title character, Prince Aphai Mani, and the siren/mermaid who guided him to Ko Samet.

== See also ==
- List of islands of Thailand
- List of national parks of Thailand
