= Banchangkarnchanakul Wittaya School =

District boarding school of Banchang in Rayong province, Thailand

Coordinates: 12.736089°N 101.052060°E

Banchangkarnchanakul Wittaya School Thai: โรงเรียนบ้านฉางกาญจนกุลวิทยา

Information
- Established: 10 June 1975; 49 years ago
- Enrollment: c.2,300
- Color(s): Yellow and black

Banchangkarnchanakul Wittaya School (Thai: โรงเรียนบ้านฉางกาญจนกุลวิทยา, romanized: Rongreīyn b̂ān c̄hāng kāỵ cn kul withyā) is a district boarding school of Banchang in Rayong province, Thailand. It is located at 185 Moo 3, Ban Chang District, Rayong 21130 and operates under the Office of Rayong Educational Service Area 1, Ministry of Education. The school has about 2,300 students, 51 classrooms and teaches both junior and senior high school. The school has an area of about 17 acres donated by Mr. Sutum Karnjanakul and Ms.Nuanshi Karnjanakul on 10 June 1975. In 1993, the school received the Royal Award.

== School History ==
Banchangkarnchanakul Wittaya School is a district boarding secondary school in Banchang Rayong. The school has an area of about 17 acres. It was donated by Mr.Sutum Karnjanakul and Ms. Nuanshi Karnjanakul.

On 10 June 1975, the Ministry of Education of Thailand approved the opening initiative of the school by means of secondary school for coeducational education, which had one classroom at the beginning. At that time, the school building construction site was not completed. The School was given permission to use one room of Banchang temple as a temporary classroom to study.

At the same time, the people from the Aid Unit of U-Tapao Airport cooperated with the syndicate to initialize the first building of the school. After the first school's structure was completed, all teachers and students moved to study at the completed building on January 6, 1976. After that the Ministry of Education of Thailand had allocated a budget to build school buildings for the school onward to present.

== School Symbols ==
- School philosophy: "Wisdom, Norran " means Wisdom is a precious glass of man
- School motto: Good study, sport, notable benefits
- School Identity: Smile to share the benefits.
- School colours: Yellow and Black "Yellow" refers to brightness and prosperity. "Black" means firmness
- School badge: A circular pattern surrounded by the school's letters which located on the Prairie of The shrine named Maria pennants land.
- School Tree: Sri Trang
