= Nikhom Phatthana district =

Nikhom Phatthana นิคมพัฒนา
- District
- District location in Rayong province
- Coordinates: 12°49′53″N 101°12′29″E
- Country: Thailand
- Province: Rayong
- Seat: Nikhom Phatthana

Area
  - Total: 237.5 km^{2} (91.7 sq mi)

Population (2005)
  - Total: 32,482
  - Density: 136.8/km^{2} (354/sq mi)
- Time zone: UTC+7 (ICT)
- Postal code: 21180
- Geocode: 2108

Nikhom Phatthana (Thai: นิคมพัฒนา, pronounced [ní(ʔ).kʰōm pʰát.tʰā.nāː]) is a district (amphoe) of Rayong province, eastern Thailand.

== History ==
The minor district (king amphoe) was established on 15 July 1996 by splitting four tambon from Ban Khai district.

On 15 May 2007, all 81 minor districts in Thailand were upgraded to full districts. With publication in the Royal Gazette on 24 August, the upgrade became official.

Around the 1950s and 1960s, most of the area was still forestland and non-asphalt road. When the authorities want to develop the area, therefore, the land was allocated to the people on a gratuitous basis to attract people to flock to live.

== Geography ==
Neighboring districts are (from the north clockwise) Pluak Daeng, Ban Khai, Mueang Rayong, and Ban Chang of Rayong Province, and Bang Lamung of Chonburi province.

== Administration ==
The district is divided into four sub-districts (tambons), which are further subdivided into 30 villages (mubans). Map Kha is a township (thesaban tambon) which covers parts of tambons Nikhon Phatthana and Map Kha. Also the town Map Ta Phut, centered in Mueang Rayong District, covers parts of tambon Map Kha as well. There are a further four tambon administrative organizations (TAO) responsible for the non-municipal areas.

No.	Name	Thai name	Villages	Pop.
1.	Nikhom Phatthana	นิคมพัฒนา	7	10,583
2.	Map Kha	มาบข่า	8	7,973
3.	Phana Nikhom	พนานิคม	8	6,085
4.	Makham Khu	มะขามคู่	7	7,841

== Economy ==
Most of the areas are industrial estates, part of the eastern seaboard.
