= Mueang Rayong district =

Mueang Rayong เมืองระยอง
- District
- District location in Rayong province
- Coordinates: 12°40′6″N 101°16′30″E
- Country: Thailand
- Province: Rayong
- Seat: Tha Pradu

Area
  - Total: 514.5 km^{2} (198.6 sq mi)

Population (2008)
  - Total: 229,657
  - Density: 410.3/km^{2} (1,063/sq mi)
- Time zone: UTC+7 (ICT)
- Postal code: 21000
- Geocode: 2101

Mueang Rayong (Thai: เมืองระยอง, pronounced [mɯ̄a̯ŋ rā.jɔ̄ːŋ]) is the capital district (amphoe mueang) of Rayong province, Thailand. The provincial administration is in Tambon Map Ta Phut.

== Geography ==
Neighboring districts are (from the west clockwise) Ban Chang, Nikhom Phatthana, Ban Khai, Wang Chan, and Klaeng. To the south is the Gulf of Thailand.

The popular holiday island of Ko Samet, which is part of the Khao Laem Ya – Mu Ko Samet National Park, is in Mueang Rayong District.

== Economy ==
The town of Map Ta Phut is in the western part of Mueang Rayong District. It is the site of the Map Ta Phut Industrial Estate, Thailand's largest petrochemical and heavy industry park. It contributes to Rayong Province's economic output, but has also become known for scandals involving hazardous waste, industrial accidents, and pollution.

== History ==
Originally named Mueang, the district was renamed after its central sub-district Tha Pradu (ท่าประดู่) in 1917. In 1938 it was renamed "Mueang Rayong".

== Administration ==
The district is divided into 15 sub-districts (tambons), which are further subdivided into 86 villages (mubans). Rayong is a city (thesaban nakhon) which covers tambons Tha Pradu and Pak Nam and parts of tambons Choeng Noen and Noen Phra. The town (thesaban mueang) Map Ta Phut covers the whole tambon Map Ta Phut and Huai Pong, parts of Noen Phra and Thap Ma and also parts of tambon Mapkha of neighboring Nikhom Phatthana district. There are a further two sub-district municipalities (thesaban tambon). Klaeng Kachet covers parts of the tambon Klaeng and Kachet, and Ban Phe parts of tambon Phe. The remaining areas of the sub-districts Noen Phra and Thap Ma as well as the whole Nam Khok are also each a sub-district municipality. The other eight sub-districts each have a tambon administrative organization (TAO).

No.	Name	Thai	Villages	Pop.
1.	Tha Pradu	ท่าประดู่	-	20,661
2.	Choeng Noen	เชิงเนิน	7	41,429
3.	Taphong	ตะพง	16	17,964
4.	Pak Nam	ปากน้ำ	-	8,843
5.	Phe	เพ	7	18,129
6.	Klaeng	แกลง	7	11,094
7.	Ban Laeng	บ้านแลง	7	6,676
8.	Na Ta Khwan	นาตาขวัญ	6	6,293
9.	Noen Phra	เนินพระ	7	29,659
10.	Kachet	กะเฉด	10	7,056
11.	Thap Ma	ทับมา	8	18,187
12.	Nam Khok	น้ำคอก	4	4,450
13.	Huai Pong	ห้วยโป่ง	1	14,280
14.	Map Ta Phut	มาบตาพุด	1	19,746
15.	Samnak Thong	สำนักทอง	5	5,190

== See also ==
- Eastern Seaboard of Thailand
