= Map Ta Phut =

Coordinates: 12°43′33″N 101°10′20″E

Map Ta Phut มาบตาพุด
- Town
- Interactive map of Map Ta Phut
- Country: Thailand
- Province: Rayong Province
- District: Mueang Rayong District, Nikhom Phatthana District

Population (2024)
  - Total: 79,773
- Time zone: UTC+7 (ICT)

Map Ta Phut (Thai: มาบตาพุด, pronounced [mâːp tāː pʰút]) is a town (thesaban mueang) in Rayong Province, Thailand. It is the site of Thailand's largest industrial park, the Map Ta Phut Industrial Estate. Provincial offices are in Map Ta Phut.

== Geography ==
The town covers parts of the sub-districts Noen Phra and Thap Ma, the whole sub-districts Huai Pong and Map Tha Phut of Mueang Rayong District, and parts of Map Kha sub-district in Nikhom Phatthana District.

== Toponymy ==
The name Map Ta Phut consists of three elements. Map is the vernacular, it means low-lying plain, the second and third elements Ta Phut is a person's name meaning the old Phut. According to local legend, Map Ta Phut is the residence of an elderly couple. The male name is Ta Phut, hence the name.

== History ==
In 1962, the sanitary district (sukhaphiban) Map Tha Phut was created as the first local government of the settlement. In 1991 it was upgraded to a sub-district municipality (thesaban tambon), and in 2001 to a town.

According to the World Resources Institute, Map Ta Phut is "...one of Thailand's most toxic hot spots with a history of air and water pollution, industrial accidents, illegal hazardous waste dumping, and pollution-related health impacts including cancer and birth deformities."
