= Khao Chamao district =

Khao Chamao เขาชะเมา
- District
- District location in Rayong province
- Coordinates: 12°58′30″N 101°41′6″E
- Country: Thailand
- Province: Rayong
- Seat: Huai Thap Mon

Area
  - Total: 269.95 km^{2} (104.23 sq mi)

Population (2005)
  - Total: 22,432
  - Density: 83.1/km^{2} (215/sq mi)
- Time zone: UTC+7 (ICT)
- Postal code: 21110
- Geocode: 2107

Khao Chamao (Thai: เขาชะเมา, pronounced [kʰǎw t͡ɕʰā.māw]) is a district (amphoe) of Rayong province, eastern Thailand.

== History ==
The minor district (king amphoe) was split off from Klaeng district on 31 May 1993.

On 15 May 2007, all 81 minor districts were upgraded to full districts. With publication in the Royal Gazette on 24 August the upgrade became official.

== Geography ==
Neighboring districts are (from the north clockwise) Bo Thong of Chonburi province, Kaeng Hang Maeo of Chanthaburi province, and Klaeng and Wang Chan of Rayong Province.

== Administration ==
The district is divided into four sub-districts (tambons), which are further subdivided into 21 villages (mubans). There are no municipal (thesabans), but there are four tambon administrative organizations (TAO).

No.	Name	Thai name	Villages	Pop.
1.	Nam Pen	น้ำเป็น	7	7,025
2.	Huai Thap Mon	ห้วยทับมอญ	8	7,419
3.	Cham Kho	ชำฆ้อ	9	5,650
4.	Khao Noi	เขาน้อย	5	2,338
