= Pluak Daeng district =

Pluak Daeng ปลวกแดง
- District
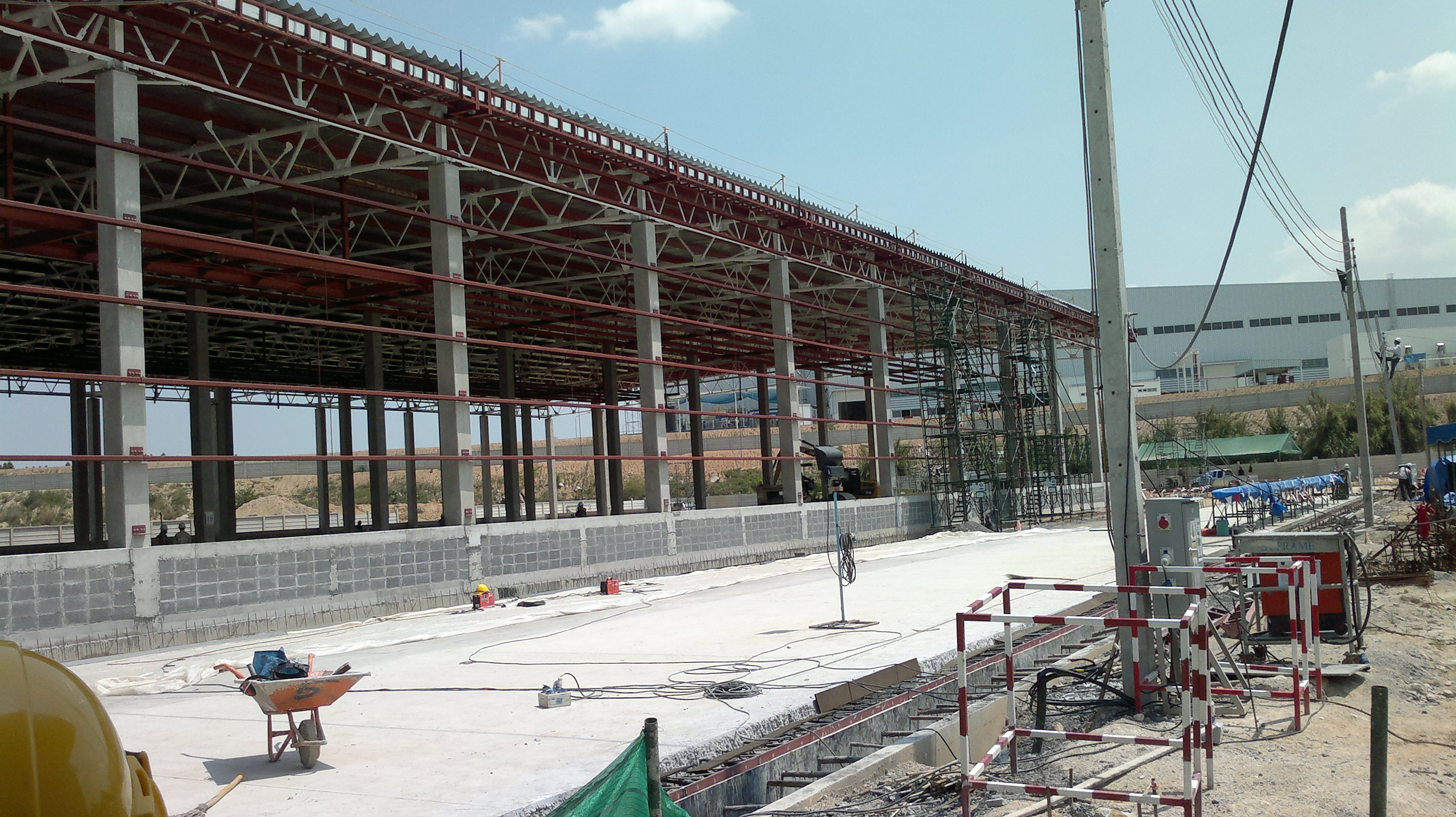
- An unfinished building in Map Yang Phon, Pluak Daeng

- District location in Rayong province
- Coordinates: 12°58′20″N 101°12′55″E
- Country: Thailand
- Province: Rayong
- Seat: Pluak Daeng
- Tambon: 6
- Muban: 34

Area
  - Total: 618.341 km^{2} (238.743 sq mi)

Population (2015)
  - Total: 58,258
  - Density: 94.2/km^{2} (244/sq mi)
- Time zone: UTC+7 (ICT)
- Postal code: 21140
- Geocode: 2106

Pluak Daeng (Thai: ปลวกแดง, pronounced [plùa̯k dɛ̄ːŋ]) is a district (amphoe) in the northwestern part of Rayong province, eastern Thailand.

== Etymology ==
The name Pluak Daeng originates from the founding of the village. The villagers found an ant hill full of red termites (Thai: Pluak Daeng), different from those in other areas.

== History ==
The area was originally part of Ban Khai district. The minor district (king amphoe) Pluak Daeng was established on 1 June 1970 consisting of the two tambons, Ta Sit and Pluak Daeng. It was upgraded to a full district on 25 March 1979.

== Geography ==
Neighbouring districts are (from the east clockwise) Wang Chan, Ban Khai, Nikhom Phatthana of Rayong Province, Bang Lamung, Si Racha and Nong Yai of Chonburi province.

The important water resource is the Nong Pla Lai Reservoir.

== Demography ==
Most of the Pluak Daeng populations are latent populations. Some are from Phitsanulok and Sukhothai or nearby provinces. They come to live here to work.

== Administration ==
=== Central administration ===
Pluak Daeng is divided into six sub-districts (tambons), which are further subdivided into 34 administrative villages (mubans).

No.	Name	Thai	Villages	Pop.
1.	Pluak Daeng	ปลวกแดง	6	17,400
2.	Ta Sit	ตาสิทธิ์	4	7,622
3.	Lahan	ละหาร	4	4,960
4.	Maenam Khu	แม่น้ำคู้	7	9,541
5.	Map Yang Phon	มาบยางพร	7	14,381
6.	Nong Rai	หนองไร่	6	4,354

=== Local administration ===
There are two sub-district municipalities (thesaban tambons) in the district:

- Chomphon Chao Phraya (Thai: เทศบาลตำบลจอมพลเจ้าพระยา) consisting of parts of sub-district Ta Sit.
- Ban Pluak Daeng (Thai: เทศบาลตำบลบ้านปลวกแดง) consisting of parts of sub-district Pluak Daeng.

There are six sub-district administrative organizations (SAO) in the district:

- Pluak Daeng (Thai: องค์การบริหารส่วนตำบลปลวกแดง) consisting of parts of sub-district Pluak Daeng.
- Ta Sit (Thai: องค์การบริหารส่วนตำบลตาสิทธิ์) consisting of parts of sub-district Ta Sit.
- Lahan (Thai: องค์การบริหารส่วนตำบลละหาร) consisting of sub-district Lahan.
- Maenam Khu (Thai: องค์การบริหารส่วนตำบลแม่น้ำคู้) consisting of sub-district Maenam Khu.
- Map Yang Phon (Thai: องค์การบริหารส่วนตำบลมาบยางพร) consisting of sub-district Map Yang Phon.
- Nong Rai (Thai: องค์การบริหารส่วนตำบลหนองไร่) consisting of sub-district Nong Rai.

== Economy ==
Pluak Daeng is considered an industrial estate area. It had five large industrial estates.
