= Klaeng district =

Klaeng แกลง
- District
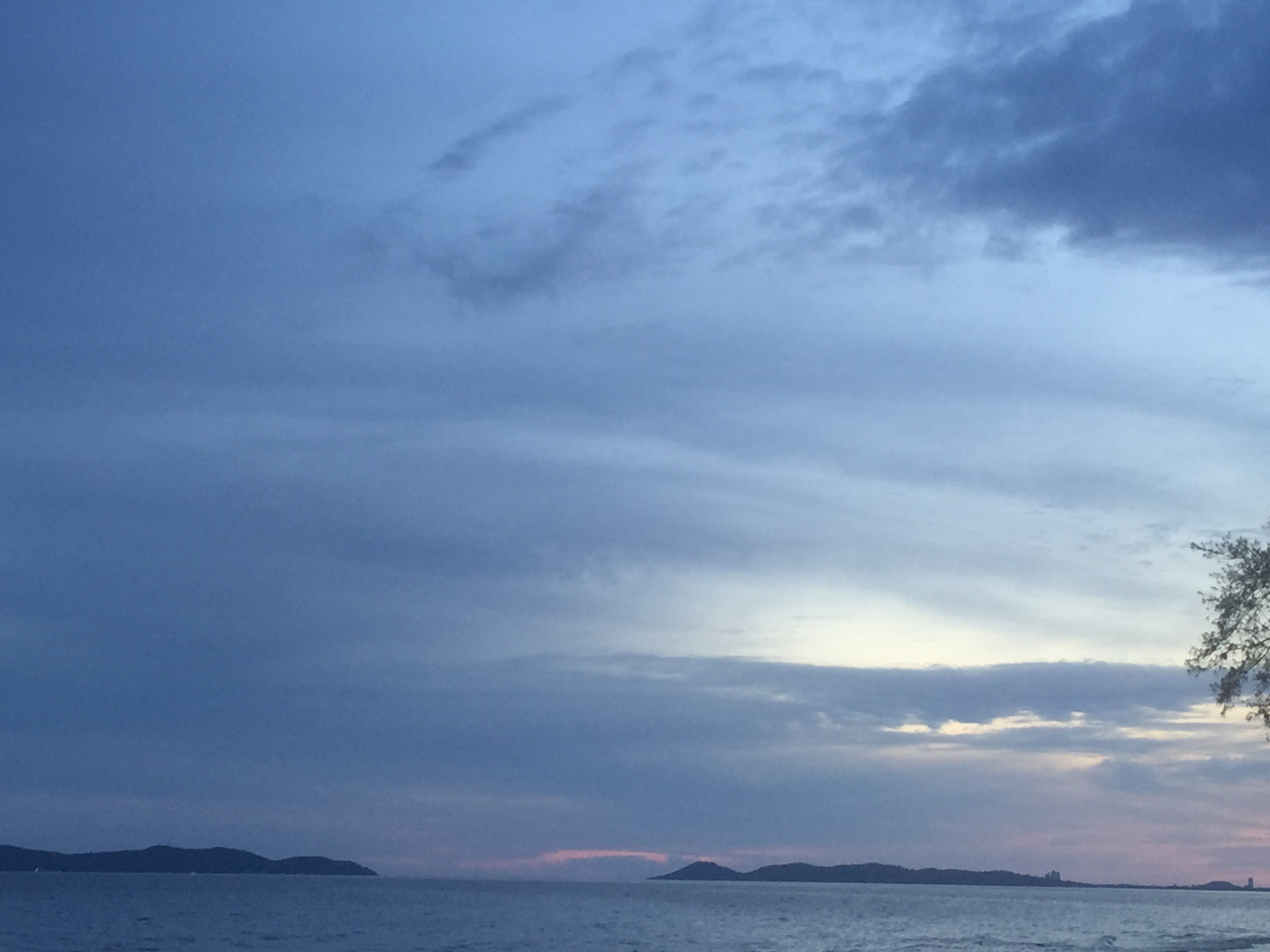
- Sand beach at Chak Phong, Klaeng

- District location in Rayong province
- Coordinates: 12°46′42″N 101°39′12″E
- Country: Thailand
- Province: Rayong

Area
  - Total: 788.463 km^{2} (304.427 sq mi)

Population (2008)
  - Total: 77,286
  - Density: 159.4/km^{2} (413/sq mi)
- Time zone: UTC+7 (ICT)
- Postal code: 21110
- Geocode: 2103

Klaeng (Thai: แกลง, pronounced [klɛ̄ːŋ]) is a district (amphoe) on the coast of Rayong province, in eastern Thailand.

== History ==
Klaeng's history dates back to the Ayutthaya Kingdom. Due to its location mid-way between Mueang Rayong district and Chanthaburi province and its abundance of natural resources such as fertile rice fields and many watercourses, it has been a magnet for immigration.

Its name is believed to be a variant of the Chong word Ka-laeng (กะแล่ง), which means "walking catfish".

Since the Ayutthaya period, Klaeng has been a place to gather people for war service.

In the reign of King Rama V, Mueang Klaeng was a fourth class city under Monthon Chanthaburi. The former city offices were in Ban Laem Mueang, Tambon Paknam Prasae. In 1897 the office was moved to Ban Pho Thong, on the north side of Wat Pho Thong. In 1908 Mueang Klaeng was downgraded to a district of Rayong Province.

== Geography ==
Neighbouring districts are (from the west clockwise): Mueang Rayong, Wang Chan, and Khao Chamao of Rayong Province; Kaeng Hang Maeo and Na Yai Am of Chanthaburi province. To the south is the Gulf of Thailand.

Klaeng's main watercourse is the Prasae River.

== Administration ==
The district is divided into 15 sub-districts (tambons), which are further subdivided into 146 villages (mubans). Klaeng is a town (thesaban mueang) which covers parts of tambons Thang Kwian and Wang Wa. There are a further four sub-district municipalities (thesaban tambons): Kong Din covers parts of tambon Kong Din, Thung Khwai Kin parts of tambons Thung Khwai Kin and Khlong Pun, Pak Nam Prasae, parts of tambons Pak Nam Krasae and Sunthorn Phu, and the entiretambons of Kram and Chak Phong. There are also 15 tambon administrative organizations (TAO).

No.	Name	Thai	Villages	Pop.
1.	Thang Kwian	ทางเกวียน	10	23,040
2.	Wang Wa	วังหว้า	14	10,661
3.	Chak Don	ชากโดน	8	4,786
4.	Noen Kho	เนินฆ้อ	9	4,525
5.	Kram	กร่ำ	6	5,574
6.	Chak Phong	ชากพง	7	8,949
7.	Krasae Bon	กระแสบน	14	7,406
8.	Ban Na	บ้านนา	13	8,250
9.	Thung Khwai Kin	ทุ่งควายกิน	13	14,808
10.	Kong Din	กองดิน	11	10,175
11.	Khlong Pun	คลองปูน	9	5,871
12.	Phang Rat	พังราด	8	6,095
13.	Pak Nam Krasae	ปากน้ำกระแส	8	6,884
17.	Huai Yang	ห้วยยาง	9	3,646
18.	Song Salueng	สองสลึง	8	5,619

Missing numbers are tambons which now form Khao Chamao district.
