= Ban Chang district =

Ban Chang บ้านฉาง
- District
- District location in Rayong province
- Coordinates: 12°43′42″N 101°3′59″E
- Country: Thailand
- Province: Rayong
- Seat: Ban Chang

Area
  - Total: 238.4 km^{2} (92.0 sq mi)

Population (2005)
  - Total: 49,189
  - Density: 206.3/km^{2} (534/sq mi)
- Time zone: UTC+7 (ICT)
- Postal code: 21130
- Geocode: 2102

Ban Chang (Thai: บ้านฉาง, pronounced [bâːn t͡ɕʰǎːŋ]) is the westernmost district (amphoe) of Rayong province, eastern Thailand.

== History ==
The area originally was Tambon Phala of Mueang Rayong district. From 1963 on the US military used the U-Tapao Royal Thai Navy Airfield, thus the community grew bigger.

The government created Ban Chang minor district (king amphoe) on 7 May 1976 by splitting two tambons from Mueang District. It was upgraded to be full district on 16 March 1985.

== Geography ==
Neighbouring districts are (from the west clockwise) Sattahip, Bang Lamung of Chonburi province, Nikhom Phatthana and Mueang Rayong of Rayong Province. To the south is the Gulf of Thailand. Ban Chang also features three beaches with Phala Beach to the west, Phayun Beach in the center and Nam Rin Beach on the eastern side of the district, with Nam Rin being the longer beach of the three

== AdministrationPuenkon Tor.Surat ==
The district is divided into three sub-districts (tambons), which are further subdivided into 22 villages (mubans). Ban Chang is a town (thesaban mueang) and covers parts of the tambon Ban Chang and Phla. Samnak Thon is a township (thesaban tambon) which covers parts of tambon Samnak Thon. There are a further three tambon administrative organizations (TAO) responsible for non-municipal areas.

No.	Name	Thai name	Villages	Pop.
1.	Samnak Thon	สำนักท้อน	8	16,442
2.	Phla	พลา	7	9,432
3.	Ban Chang	บ้านฉาง	7	23,315

== Notable people ==
- Puenkon Tor.Surat: Muay Thai boxer.
- Panupong Jadnok: Social Activist.

== Education ==
- Banchangkarnchanakul Wittaya School

== See also ==
- U-Tapao International Airport
