= Wang Chan district =

Wang Chan วังจันทร์
- District
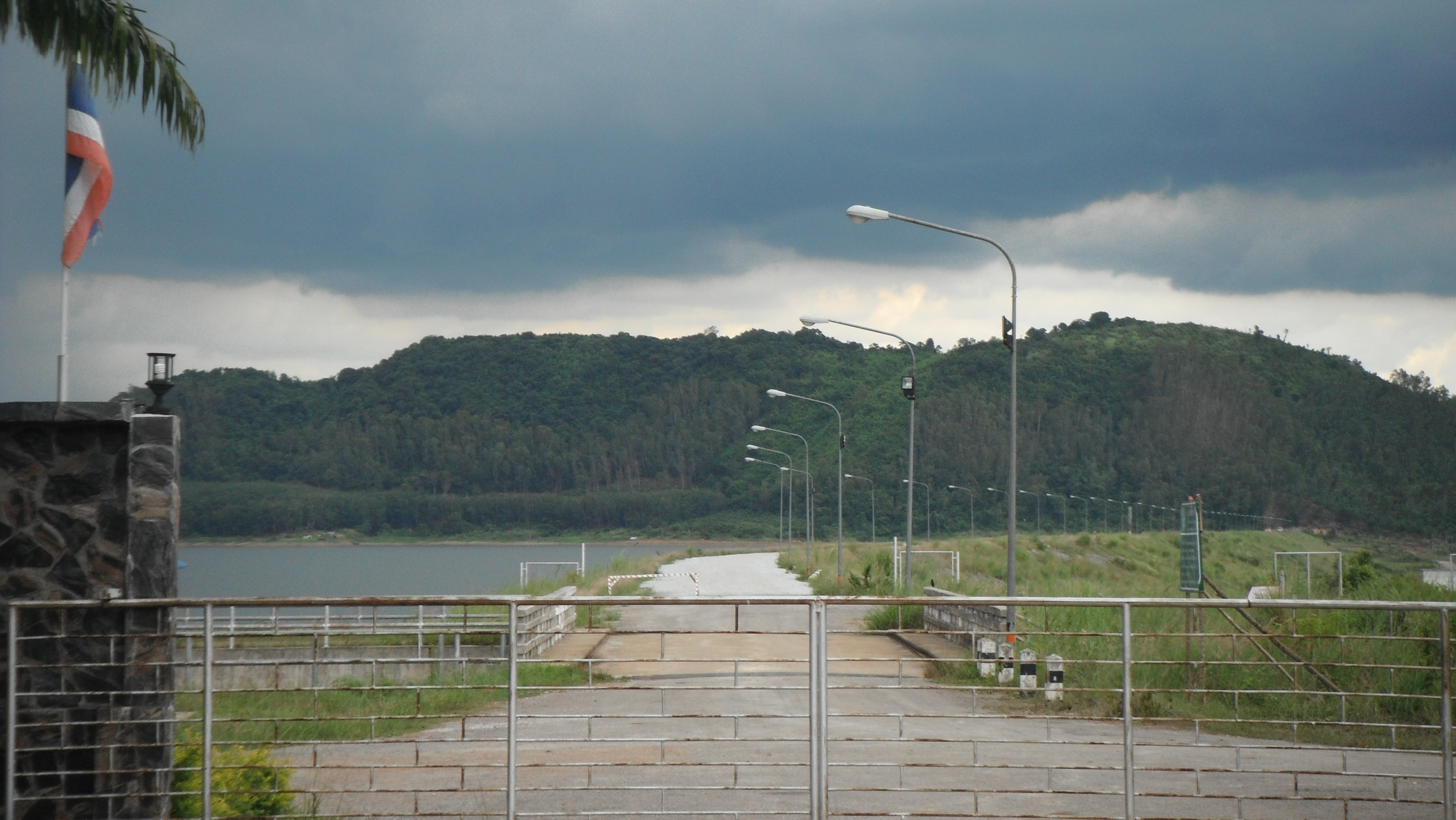
- Prasae Reservoir, Chum Saeng

- District location in Rayong province
- Coordinates: 12°56′5″N 101°31′13″E
- Country: Thailand
- Province: Rayong
- Seat: Chum Saeng

Area
  - Total: 395.245 km^{2} (152.605 sq mi)

Population (2005)
  - Total: 24,481
  - Density: 61.9/km^{2} (160/sq mi)
- Time zone: UTC+7 (ICT)
- Postal code: 21210
- Geocode: 2104

Wang Chan (Thai: วังจันทร์, pronounced [wāŋ t͡ɕān]) is a district (amphoe) in the northern part of Rayong province, eastern Thailand.

== History ==
The minor district (king amphoe) Wang Chan was created on 16 November 1977 by splitting off the two tambons Chum Saeng and Wang Chan from Klaeng district. It was upgraded to a full district on 19 July 1991.

== Geography ==
Neighboring districts are (from the east clockwise) Khao Chamao, Klaeng, Mueang Rayong, Ban Khai and Pluak Daeng of Rayong Province, and Nong Yai and Bo Thong of Chonburi province.

== Administration ==
The district is divided into four sub-districts (tambons), which are further subdivided into 30 villages (mubans). Chum Saeng is a township (thesaban tambon) which covers parts of tambons Chum Saeng and Phlong Ta Iam. There are a further four tambon administrative organizations (TAO).

| No. | Name | Thai name | Villages | Pop. |
|---|---|---|---|---|
| 1. | Wang Chan | วังจันทร์ | 6 | 3,959 |
| 2. | Chum Saeng | ชุมแสง | 8 | 8,463 |
| 3. | Pa Yup Nai | ป่ายุบใน | 8 | 6,855 |
| 4. | Phlong Ta Iam | พลงตาเอี่ยม | 8 | 5,204 |

== Gallery ==
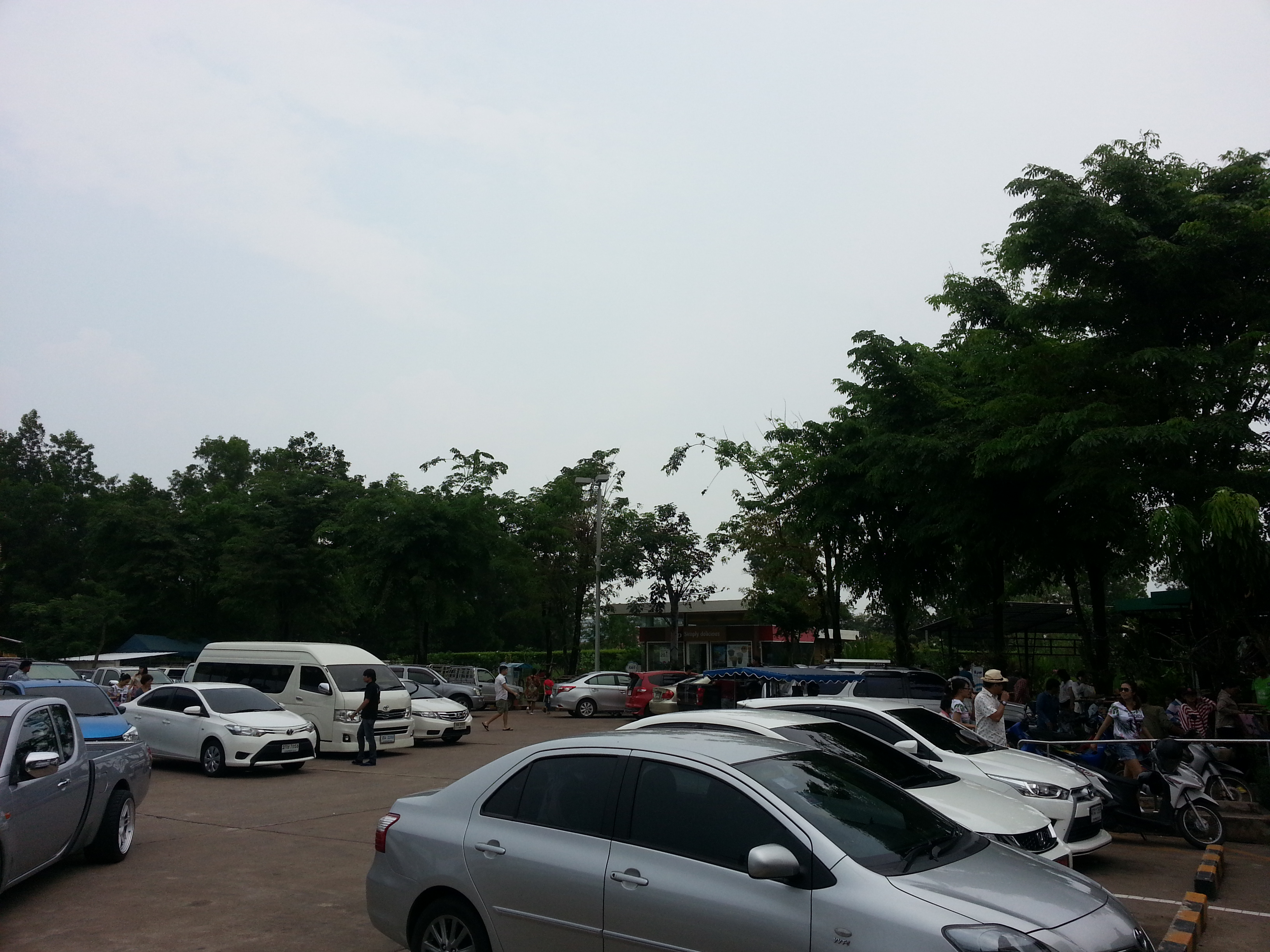
Chum Saeng, Wang Chan District, Rayong 21210, Thailand

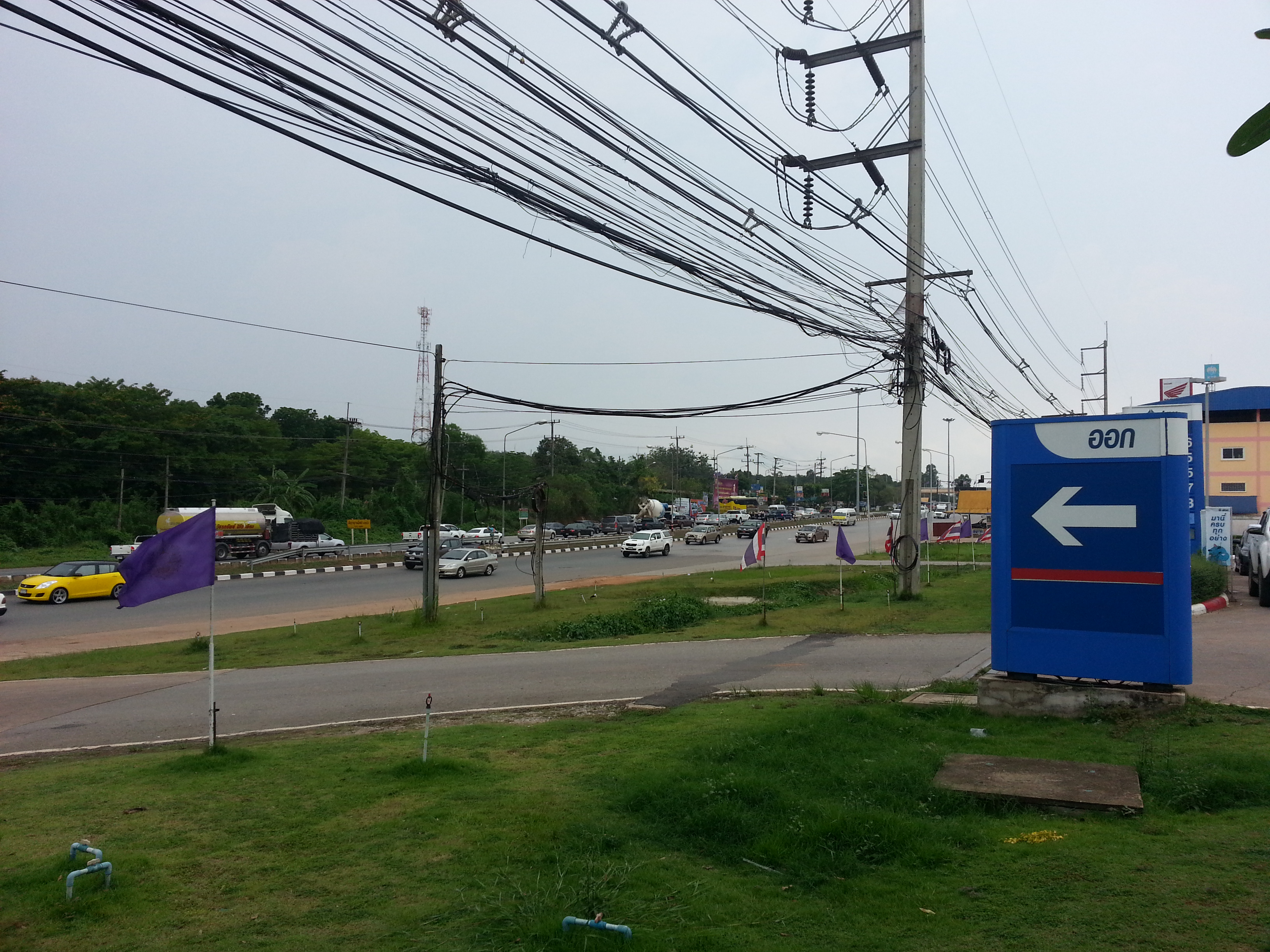
Chum Saeng, Wang Chan District, Rayong 21210, Thailand
