= Ban Khai district =

Ban Khai บ้านค่าย
- District
- District location in Rayong province
- Coordinates: 12°47′1″N 101°17′48″E
- Country: Thailand
- Province: Rayong
- Seat: Ban Khai

Area
  - Total: 489.6 km^{2} (189.0 sq mi)

Population (2005)
  - Total: 58,914
  - Density: 120.3/km^{2} (312/sq mi)
- Time zone: UTC+7 (ICT)
- Postal code: 21120
- Geocode: 2105

Ban Khai (Thai: บ้านค่าย, pronounced [bâːn kʰâːj]) is a district (amphoe) in the central part of Rayong province, eastern Thailand.

== History ==
In 1767 after Ayutthaya was destroyed by the Burmese, King Taksin the Great lead his troops to build a Siamese military base at Chanthaburi. On the way to Chanthaburi, the troops had their night camp (Thai: khai ค่าย) in the area of modern-day Ban Khai District. Assumed that Ban Khai and the area called Ban Kao at that time was the center of Rayong.

Ban Khai was created as a district of Rayong Province in 1902.

== Geography ==
Neighboring districts are (from the west clockwise) Nikhom Phatthana, Pluak Daeng, Wang Chan and Mueang Rayong.

== Administration ==
The district is divided into seven sub-districts (tambons), which are further subdivided into 66 villages (mubans). Ban Khai itself is a township (thesaban tambon) and covers parts of tambons Ban Khai and Nong Lalok. There are a further seven tambon administrative organizations (TAO).

No.	Name	Thai name	Villages	Pop.
1.	Ban Khai	บ้านค่าย	7	7,340
2.	Nong Lalok	หนองละลอก	11	11,470
3.	Nong Taphan	หนองตะพาน	6	3,504
4.	Ta Khan	ตาขัน	9	7,237
5.	Bang But	บางบุตร	12	9,666
6.	Nong Bua	หนองบัว	11	12,040
7.	Chak Bok	ชากบก	10	7,657
