= Map Ta Phut Industrial Estate =

Large industrial park in the town of Map Ta Phut in Rayong Province, Thailand

Coordinates: 12.6913°N 101.1426°E

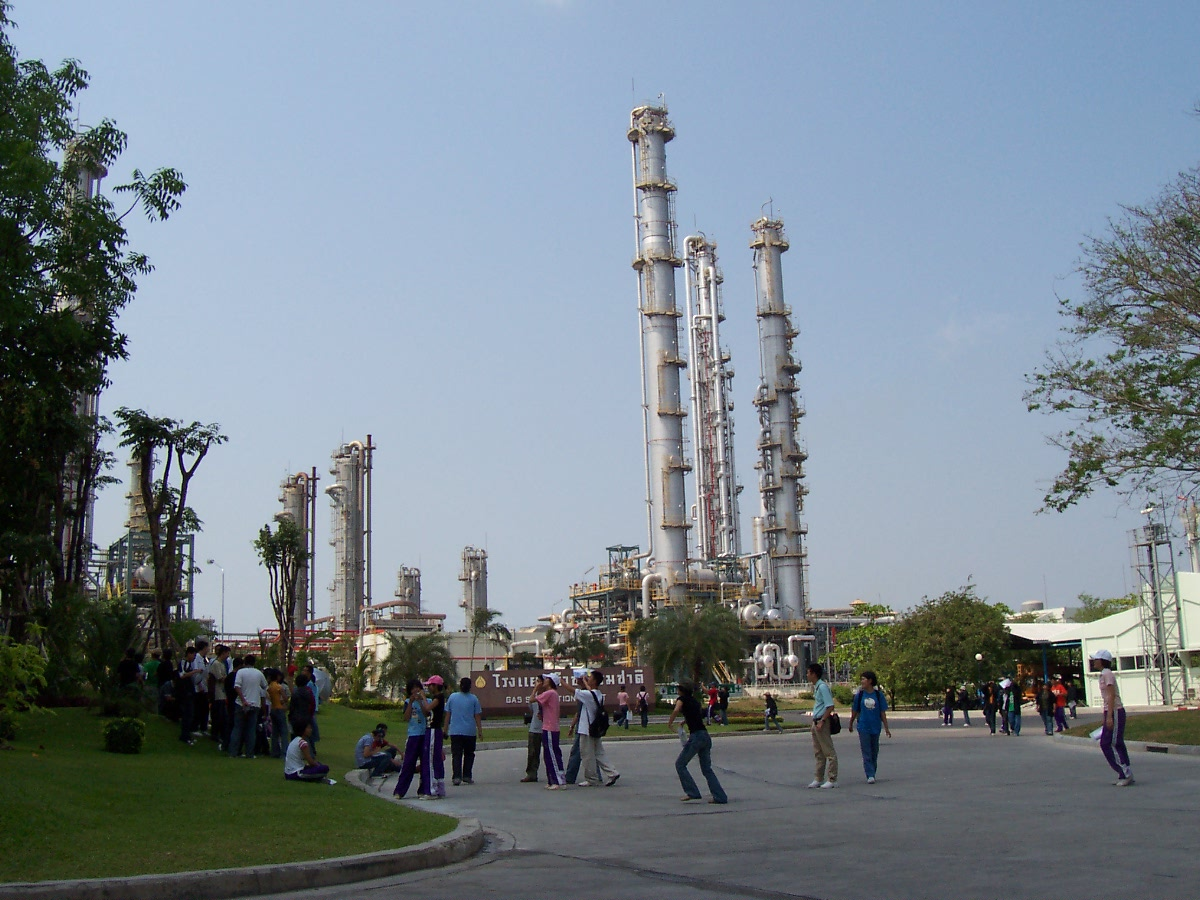
Natural gas separation plant, Map Tha Phut

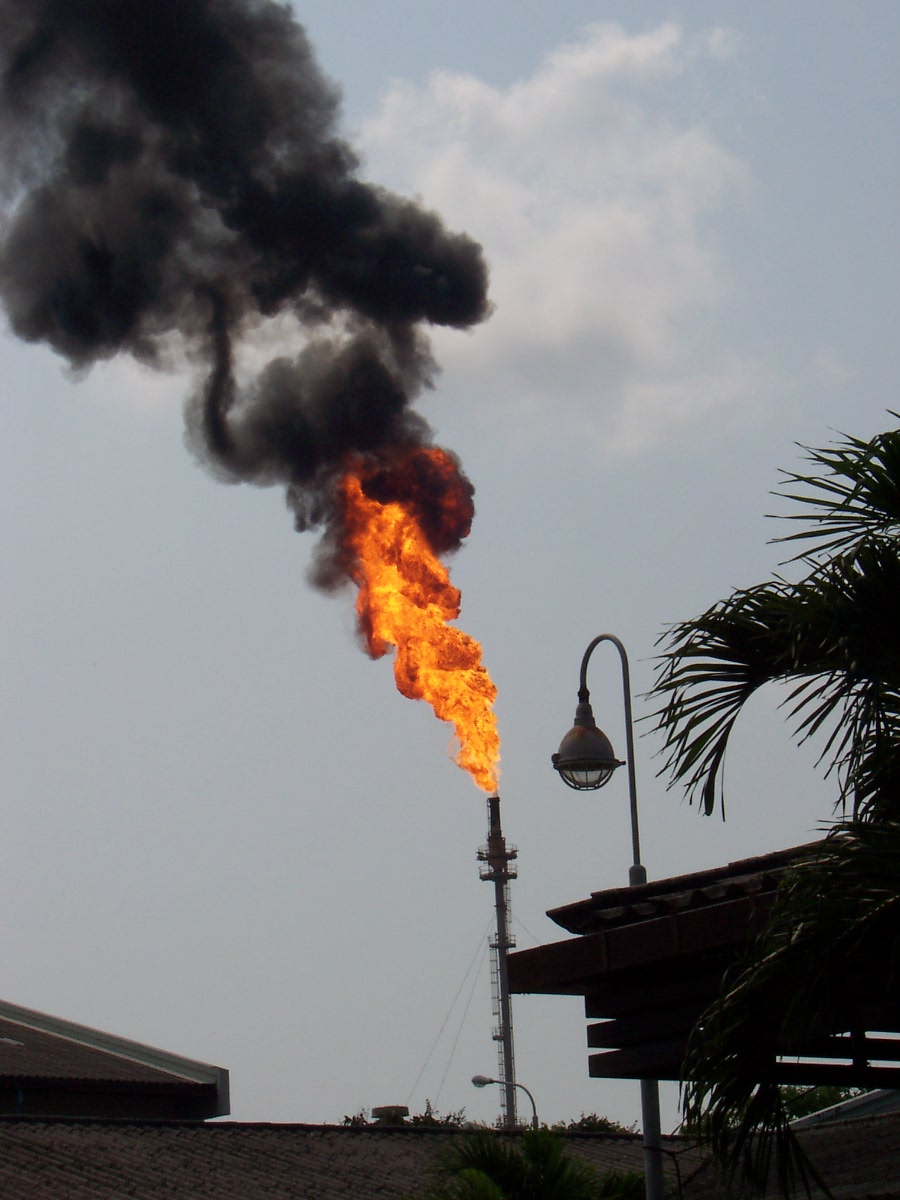
Gas flare at PTT plant, Map Ta Phut

The Map Ta Phut Industrial Estate is a large industrial park in the town of Map Ta Phut in Rayong Province, Thailand. Part of Thailand's eastern seaboard economic region, it is the country's largest industrial estate and the world's eighth-largest petrochemical industrial hub. It was opened in 1990 and is managed by the Industrial Estate Authority of Thailand, a state enterprise under the Ministry of Industry.

Map Ta Phut houses five industrial estates, one deep-sea port, and 151 factories, including petrochemical plants, oil refineries, coal-fired power stations, and iron and steel facilities. The zone occupies 166 km^{2}. The area contains around 30 agricultural and residential communities with more than 49,000 residents.

== Environmental issues ==
According to the World Resources Institute, "Map Ta Phut is one of the Thailand's most toxic hot spots with a...history of air and water pollution, industrial accidents, illegal hazardous waste dumping, and pollution-related health impacts including cancer and birth deformities."

In 2007, 11 communities in the Map Ta Phut zone filed a lawsuit against the National Environmental Board (NEB), alleging that the board had improperly failed to designate Map Ta Phut and its vicinity a pollution control zone. Another lawsuit was filed against the NEB and eight other Thai ministries by community organizations. Managed by the Eastern People's Network, the lawsuit focused on the failure to follow prescribed procedures, including conducting environmental and health impact assessments, before issuing licenses to 76 new industrial projects. In 2009, the Supreme Administrative Court suspended the development of 65 projects at the estate, worth an estimated US$8 billion, due to inadequate health impact assessments. It allowed 11 projects to proceed. Ultimately, 74 of the 76 contested projects were allowed to continue.

- On 6 March 2000 a phosgene gas leak at the Thai Polycarbonates plastic factory killed two workers and injured many locals.
- A 2012 explosion at the factory of a Bangkok Synthetics subsidiary killed 11 and injured another 129 people.
- A day following the Bangkok Synthetics explosion, a chemical leak occurred at the Aditya Birla Chemicals plant, leading to the hospitalization of 138 people.
