= Eastern Seaboard (Thailand) =

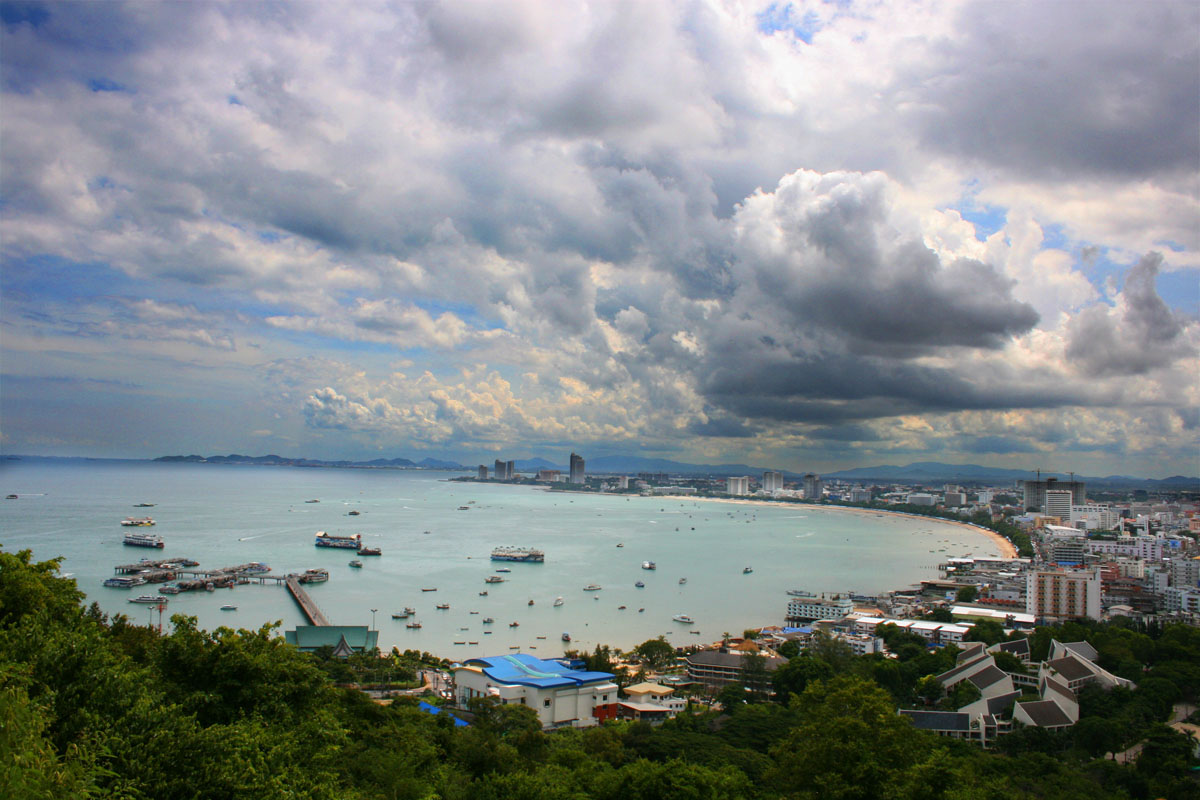
Pattaya, a major city on Thailand's eastern seaboard

Thailand's Eastern Seaboard is an economic area that serves as one of the country's main industrial hubs, with main centers in Laem Chabang and Map Ta Phut on the coast of eastern Thailand. It was developed from the 1980s through the government's Eastern Seaboard Development Program (โครงการพัฒนาพื้นที่บริเวณชายฝั่งทะเลตะวันออก), and from the 2010s has been subsumed into the newer Eastern Economic Corridor (EEC) project.

The Eastern Seaboard plays a key role in Thailand's economy. It is Thailand's center for export-oriented industries. High value goods, such as Japanese branded automobiles, which are manufactured there and shipped elsewhere, are among the many exports. The region includes Chonburi Province, Chachoengsao Province, and Rayong Province with Samut Prakan Province on the periphery.

== Development ==
The Eastern Seaboard Development Programme (ESDP) was initiated as part of the Fifth Economic and Social Development Plan of Thailand (1982–1986). It aimed at developing the region of the eastern seaboard in order to promote industrial growth and to decentralize economic and population growth. The Thai government approached the World Bank for funding, but was turned away as, in the eyes of the bank, the project lacked "economic rationality". Japan rescued the project by providing a modest 178.8 billion yen (US$1.6 billion) in loans, underwriting the construction of 16 projects: ports, roads, waterworks, and industrial parks. Japanese companies then invested heavily in the region. As of 2020, many of the estimated 5,500 Japanese companies in Thailand have facilities in the area.

The economic importance of the region is evident through the central government's commitment to the region's infrastructure. Planners see the region as strategically important as it borders the gulf as well as being close to Bangkok, and its major airport.

Laem Chabang port, Thailand's largest and 23rd busiest port in the world as of 2014, is the region's port. Bangkok, Suvarnabhumi Airport, and the port are all linked by the Bang Na Expressway tollway.

Two large infrastructure projects worth a total of 36 billion baht, both railways, were approved on 23 October 2007, to link Korat and Lat Krabang with Laem Chabang port.

The Chonburi Motorway, Thailand's first motorway, links the region with Suvarnabhumi Airport and Bangkok. In November 2007, Thailand's completed its second motorway, Bangkok's outer ring road.

The region is home to many huge industrial estates. Other than its manufacturing and shipping industries, it has a diverse service sector consisting of the tourism, construction, and retail industries.

After the 2014 coup, the military government announced the creation of a special economic zone called the Eastern Economic Corridor (EEC), which superseded the Eastern Seaboard project.

== Environmental impacts ==
Serious problems resulting from pollution have plagued the Map Ta Phut Industrial Estate in Rayong, an industrial zone for petrochemical and heavy industries that has suffered from heavy metal and organophosphates poisoning. Factory workers in the region are among the highest paid in Thailand, often more than physicians in the region, but occasionally suffer physical ailments. A lawsuit filed by local villagers in 2007 led to a cascade of decisions that in 2009 stopped work on many projects under construction for not being in compliance with environmental provisions in the country's new constitution.
