= Rayong province =

Province of Thailand

Coordinates: 12°40′32″N 101°16′42″E

Rayong ระยอง
- Province
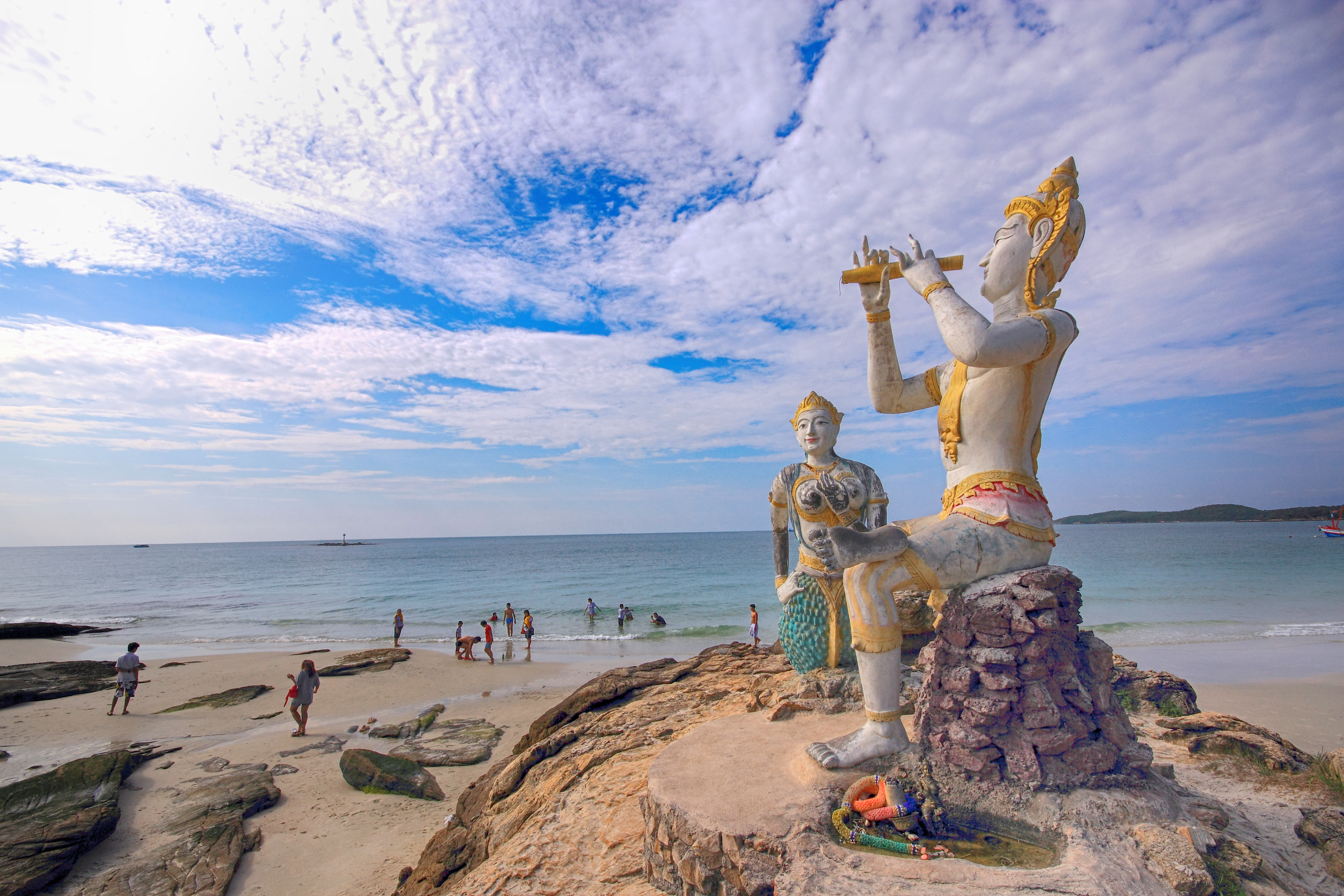
- The statues of Phra Aphamani and the mermaid, characters from a famous Thai epic poem by Sunthon Phu, on Ko Samet

- Flag Seal
- Mottoes: ผลไม้รสล้ำ อุตสาหกรรมก้าวหน้า น้ำปลารสเด็ด เกาะเสม็ดสวยหรู สุนทรภู่กวีเอก ("Succulent fruit. Progressive industry. Tasty fish sauce. Beautiful and luxurious Ko Samet. Sunthon Phu, the great poet.")
- Map of Thailand highlighting Rayong province
- Country: Thailand
- Capital: Rayong

Government
  - Governor: Tripop Wongtrairat

Area
  - Total: 3,666 km^{2} (1,415 sq mi)
  - Rank: 57th

Population (2024)
  - Total: ▲782,171
  - Rank: 32nd
  - Density: 213/km^{2} (550/sq mi)
  - Rank: 14th

Human Achievement Index
  - HAI (2022): 0.6599 "high" Ranked 13th

GDP
  - Total: baht 985 billion (US$34 billion) (2019)
- Time zone: UTC+7 (ICT)
- Postal code: 21xxx
- Calling code: 038
- ISO 3166 code: TH-21
- Website: rayong.go.th

Rayong Provincial Administrative Organization องค์การบริหารส่วนจังหวัดระยอง
- Provincial Administrative Organization
- Interactive map of Rayong Provincial Administrative Organization

Government
  - Type: Local administrative divisions
  - Body: Rayong Provincial Administrative Organization
  - President: Piya Pitutecha
- Website: rayongpao.go.th

Rayong province (Thai: ระยอง, pronounced [rá.jɔ̄ːŋ]) is one of seventy-six provinces (changwat) within Thailand, and lies in eastern Thailand. The province is bordered by Chonburi to its west and north; Chanthaburi to its east; and the Gulf of Thailand to its south.

As of 2016, per capita earnings were higher in Rayong province than in any other Thai province.

== History ==
Rayong was first described in 1570 in the reign of Maha Thammaracha, when the Khmer ruler invaded Siam in Rayong city but was unable to seize it.

Following the fall of Ayutthaya to the Burmese during the Burmese–Siamese War, the future king of the Thonburi kingdom, Taksin, arrived in Rayong. In Rayong, Taksin built a new navy before going on to Chanthaburi to assemble forces to fight the Burmese. Taksin then passed back through Rayong during the reunification of Siam as the Thonburi kingdom. The oldest temple in Rayong, Wat Pa Pradu, is dedicated to Taksin where locals worship his spirit.

In 1906, Rayong was merged to Monthon Chanthaburi. In 1908, Klaeng district was merged to Rayong.

In the reign of King Rama VI, changed the name of "Rayong City" to "Rayong province" in 1916 but it still part of Monthon Chanthaburi. Later in 1931, Monthon Chanthaburi was dissolved and Rayong was merged to Monthon Prachinburi.

== Geography ==
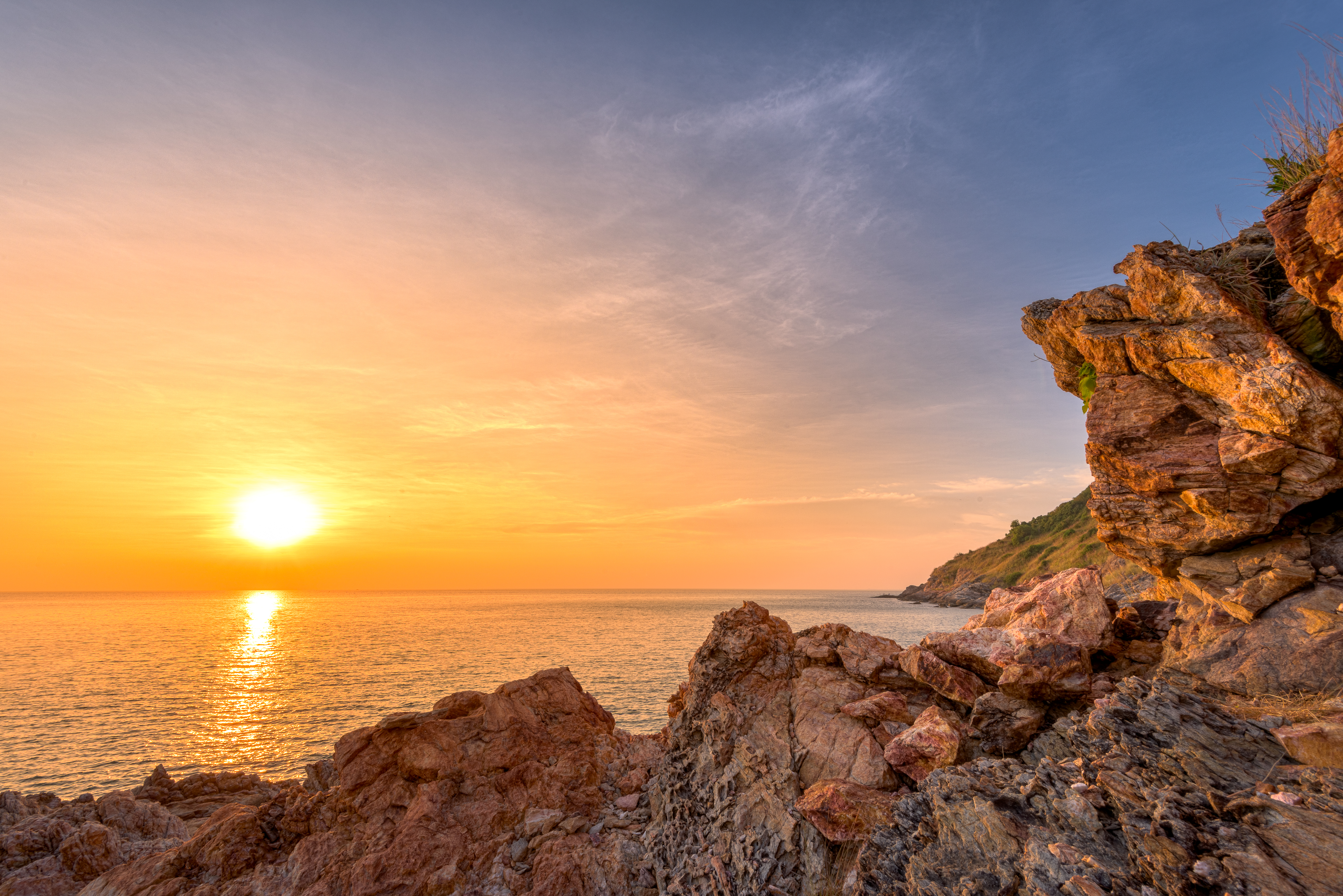
The sunset at Khao Laem Ya–Mu Ko Samet National Park

Although the north is hilly, the province consists mostly of low coastal plains. The total forest area is 292 km^{2} (113 sq mi) or 8 percent of provincial area. Off the shoreline of Mueang Rayong District is Khao Laem Ya–Mu Ko Samet National Park, consisting of several islands.

=== National parks ===
There are two national parks, along with five other national parks, make up region 2 (Si Racha) of Thailand's protected areas.(Visitors in fiscal year 2024)

Khao Laem Ya–Mu Ko Samet National Park	131 km^{2} (51 sq mi)	(1,271,312)
Khao Chamao–Khao Wong National Park	84 km^{2} (32 sq mi)	(156,009)

== Symbols ==
The seal of the province shows the island Ko Samet. The provincial tree is the Alexandrian laurel (Calophyllum inophyllum). Neolissochilus soroides is a provincial fish.

== Economy ==
Rayong is one of the three Thai provinces, together with Chonburi and Chachoengsao, at the center of the nation's Eastern Economic Corridor. The three provinces are to become Thailand's hub for manufacturing, research, and services tightly coupled with its ASEAN neighbors and the world logistically. The project is the centerpiece of the government's "Thailand 4.0" economic initiative.

== Administrative divisions ==
Map of Rayong with 8 districts

=== Provincial government ===
The province is divided into eight districts (amphoes). These are further divided into 58 subdistricts (tambons) and 388 villages (mubans).

1. Mueang Rayong
2. Ban Chang
3. Klaeng
4. Wang Chan
5. Ban Khai
6. Pluak Daeng
7. Khao Chamao
8. Nikhom Phatthana

=== Local government ===
As of 21 November 2019 there are: one Rayong Provincial Administrative Organization - PAO (ongkan borihan suan changwat) and 30 municipal (thesaban) areas in the province. The capital Rayong has city (thesaban nakhon) status. Ban Chang and Map Ta Phut have town (thesaban mueang) status and 27 subdistrict municipalities (thesaban tambon). The non-municipal areas are administered by 37 Subdistrict Administrative Organizations - SAO (ongkan borihan suan tambon).

== Health ==
Rayong's main hospital is Rayong Hospital, operated by the Ministry of Public Health.

== Human achievement index 2022 ==
Health	Education	Employment	Income
8	11	4	8
Housing	Family	Transport	Participation
73	5	77	61
Province Rayong, with an HAI 2022 value of 0.6599 is "high", occupies place 13 in the ranking.

Since 2003, United Nations Development Programme (UNDP) in Thailand has tracked progress on human development at sub-national level using the Human achievement index (HAI), a composite index covering all the eight key areas of human development. National Economic and Social Development Board (NESDB) has taken over this task since 2017.

Rank	Classification
1 - 13	"high"
14 - 29	"somewhat high"
30 - 45	"average"
46 - 61	"somewhat low"
62 - 77	"low"

Map with provinces and HAI 2022 rankings

== Notable People from Rayong province ==
- Petchara Chaowarat (born 1943), Actress
- Dhawee Umponmaha (born 1959), Muay Thai kickboxer and 1984 Olympics silver medalist (Light welterweight)
- Amphol Lumpoon (born 1963), Rocker and actor
- Singdam Or.Ukrit (born 1974), Muay Thai kickboxer
- Kittisak Rawangpa (born 1975), Footballer
- Jirayu La-ongmanee (born 1995), Actor
- Stamp Fairtex (born 1997), Muay Thai kickboxer and mixed martial artist (ONE Championship)

== Gallery ==
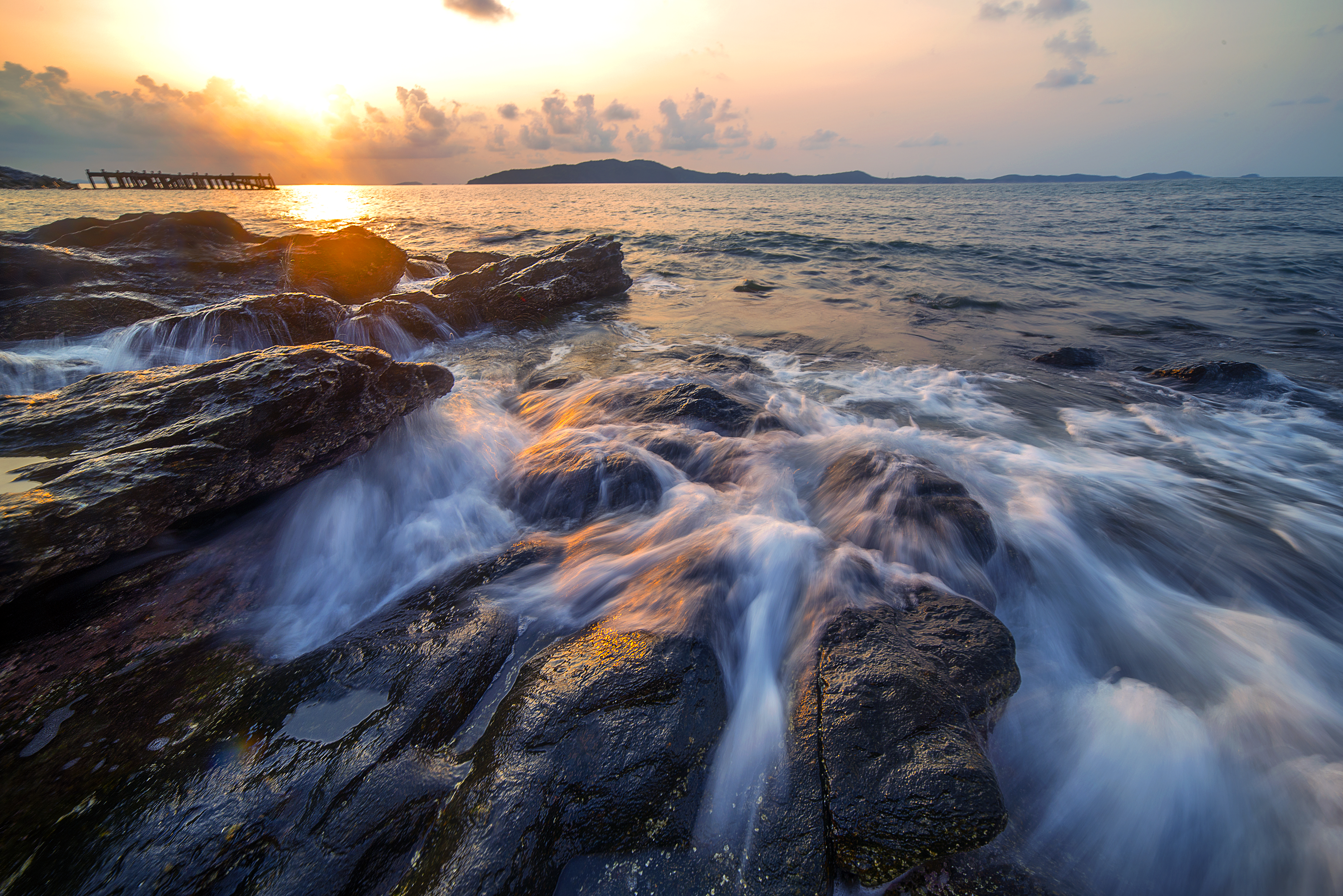
The cape of Khao Laem Ya in the morning, Khao Laem Ya – Mu Ko Samet National Park

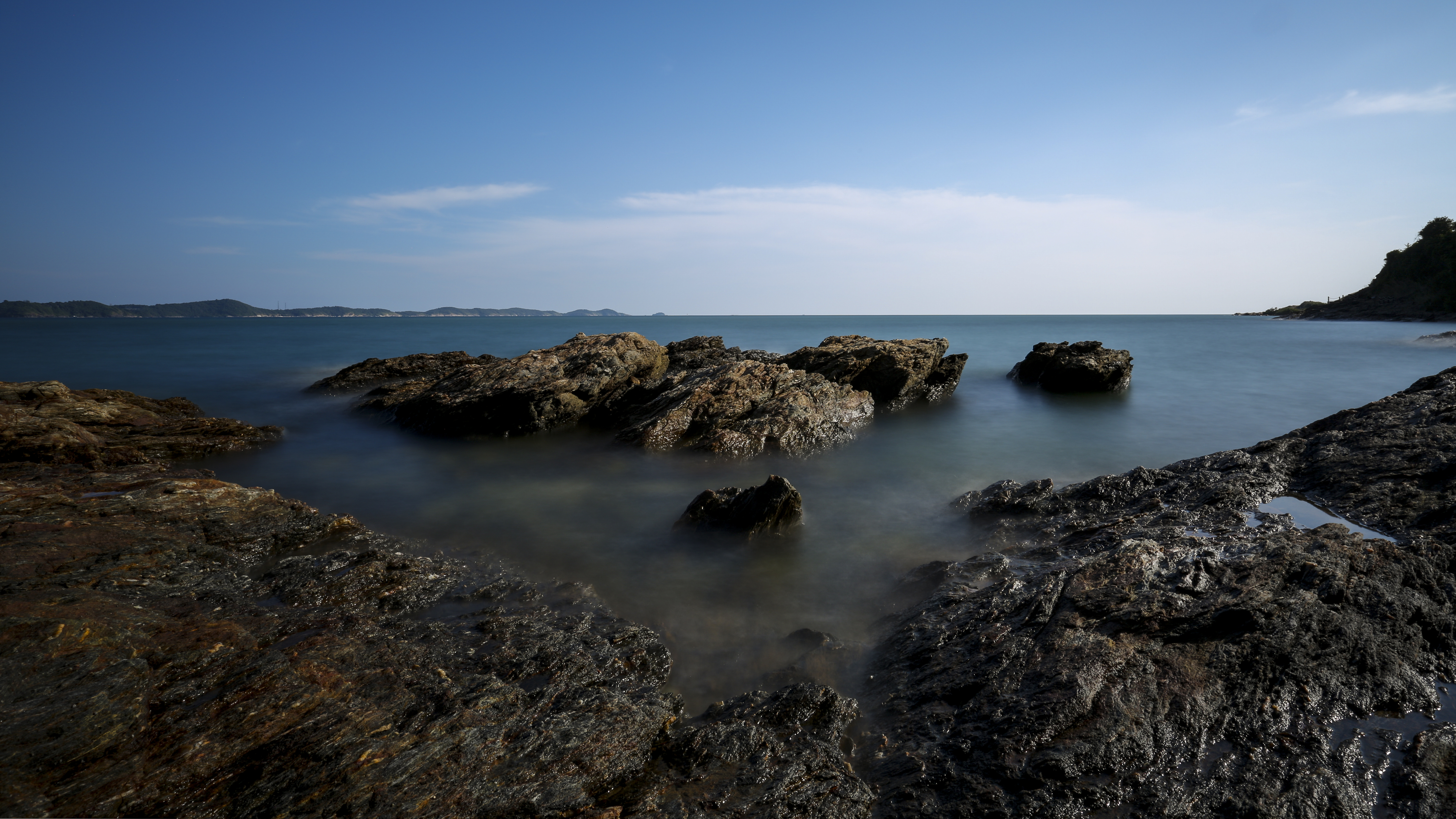
Khao Laem Ya – Mu Ko Samet National Park

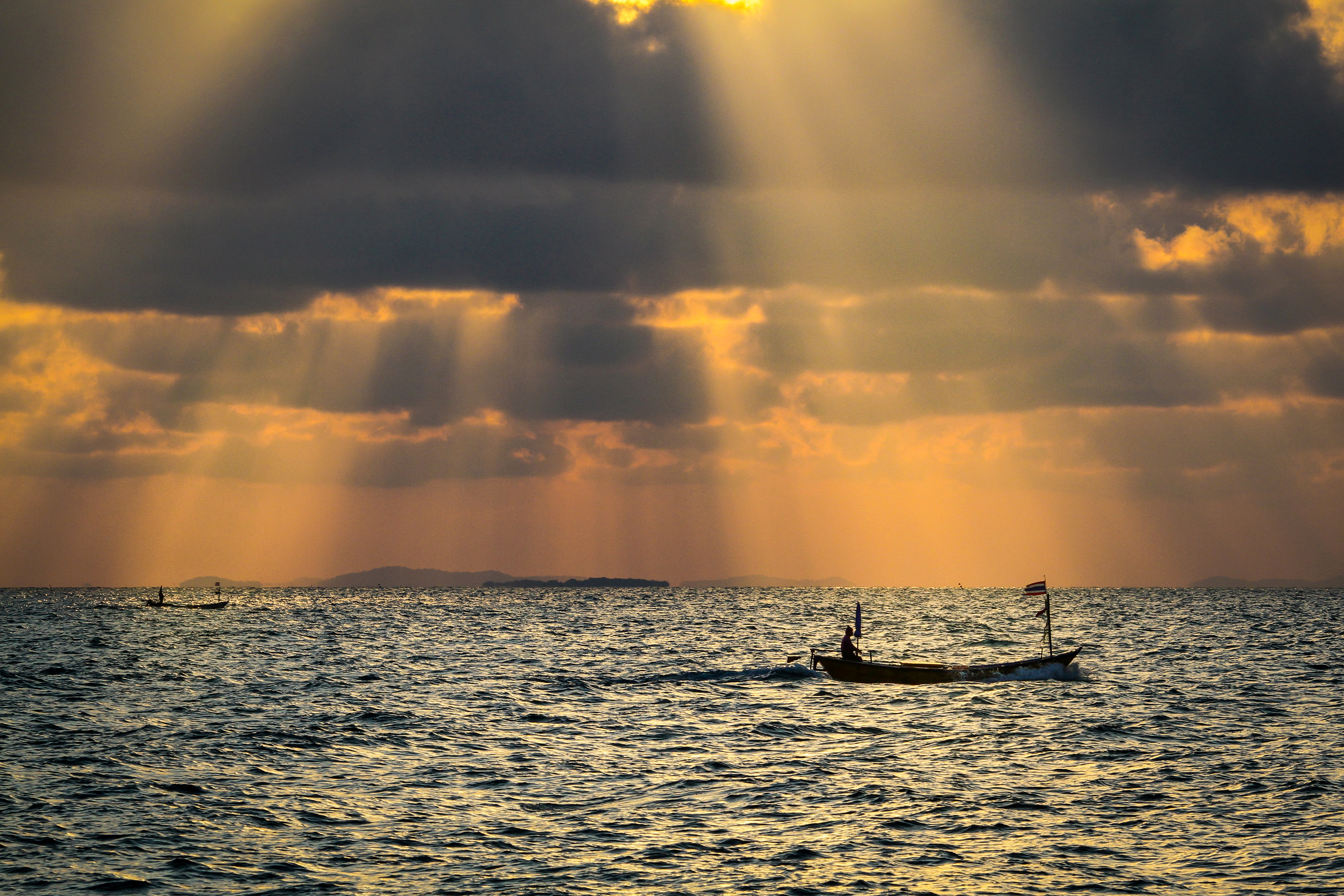
Khao Laem Ya – Mu Ko Samet National Park

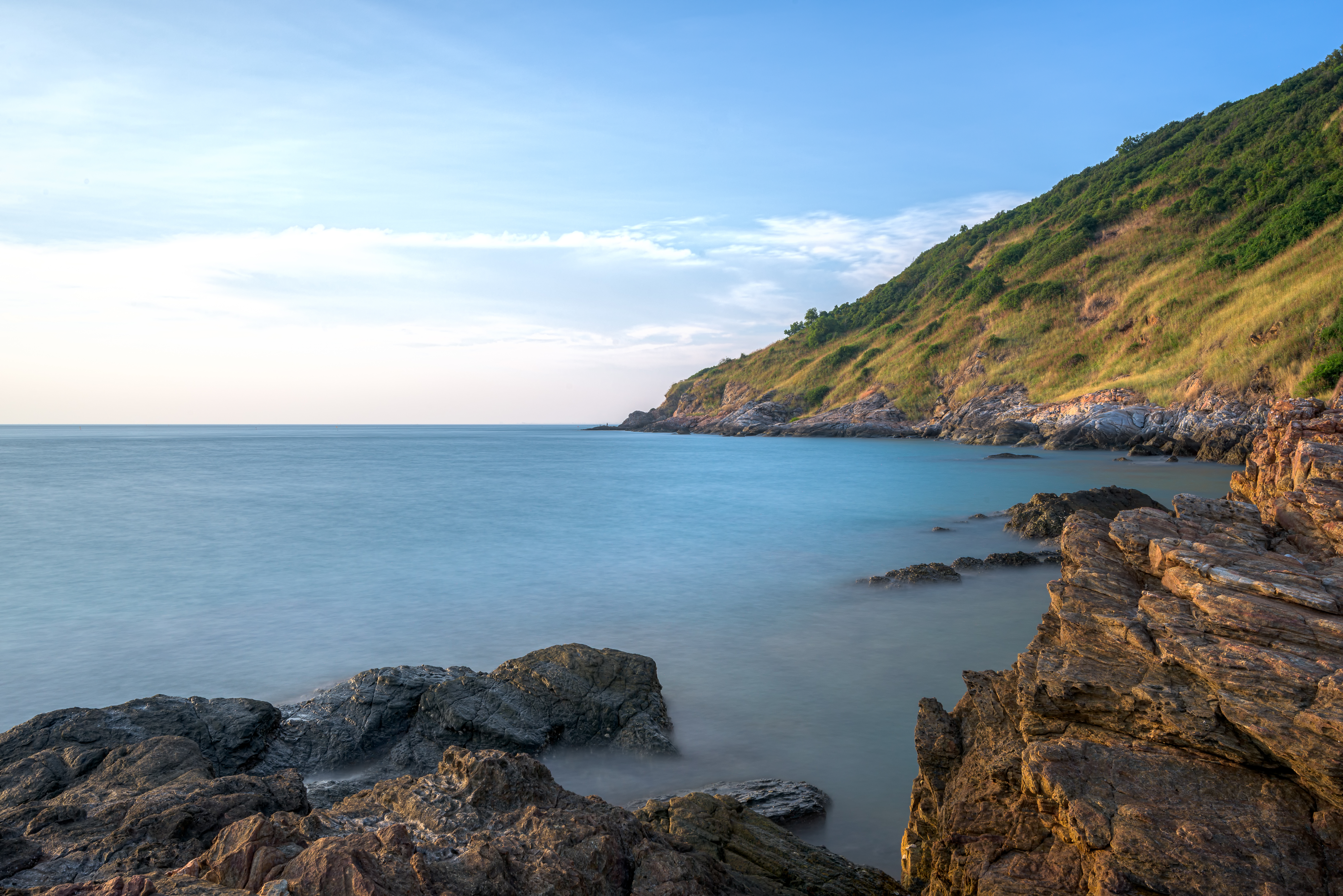
Khao Laem Ya – Mu Ko Samet National Park

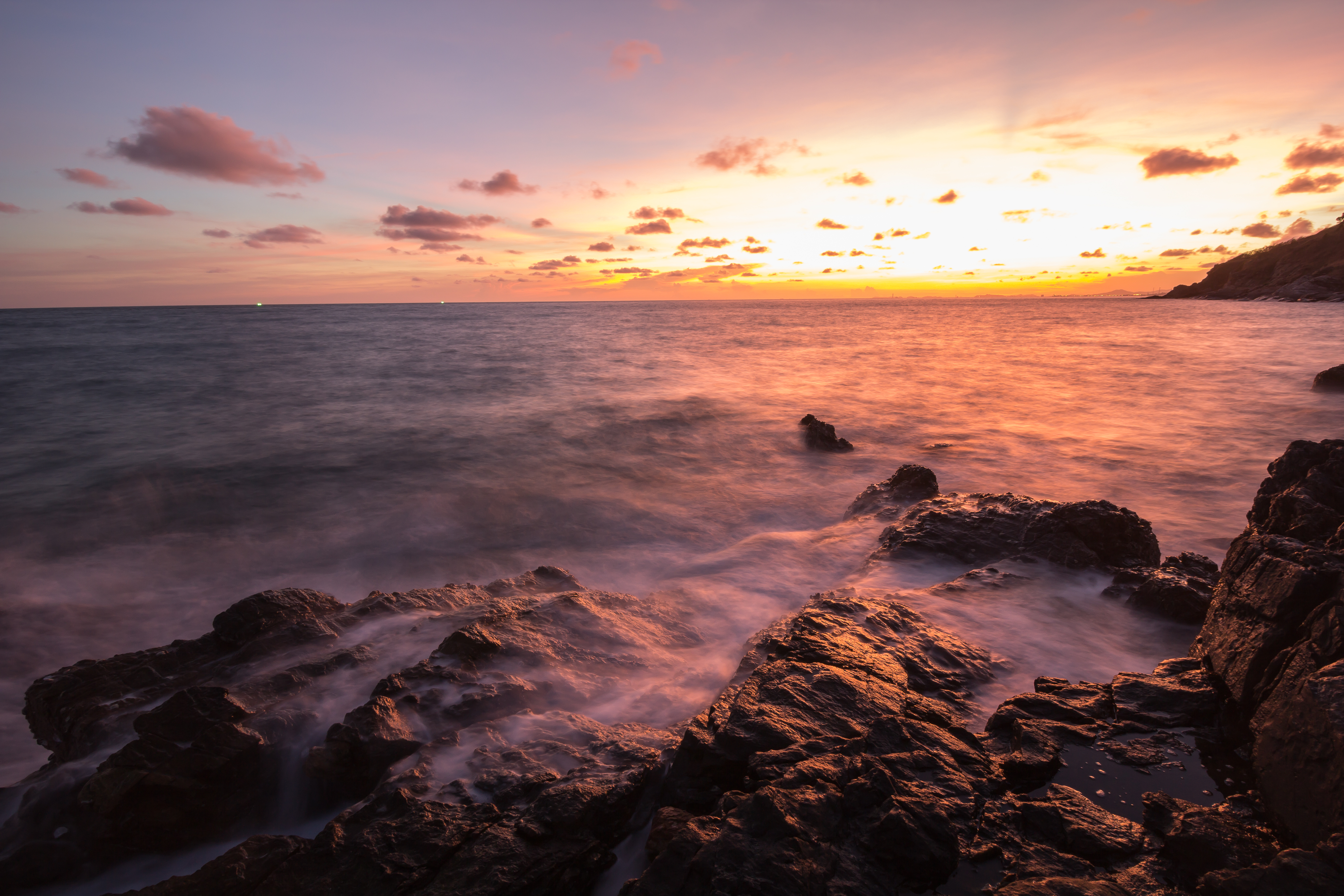
Khao Laem Ya – Mu Ko Samet National Park

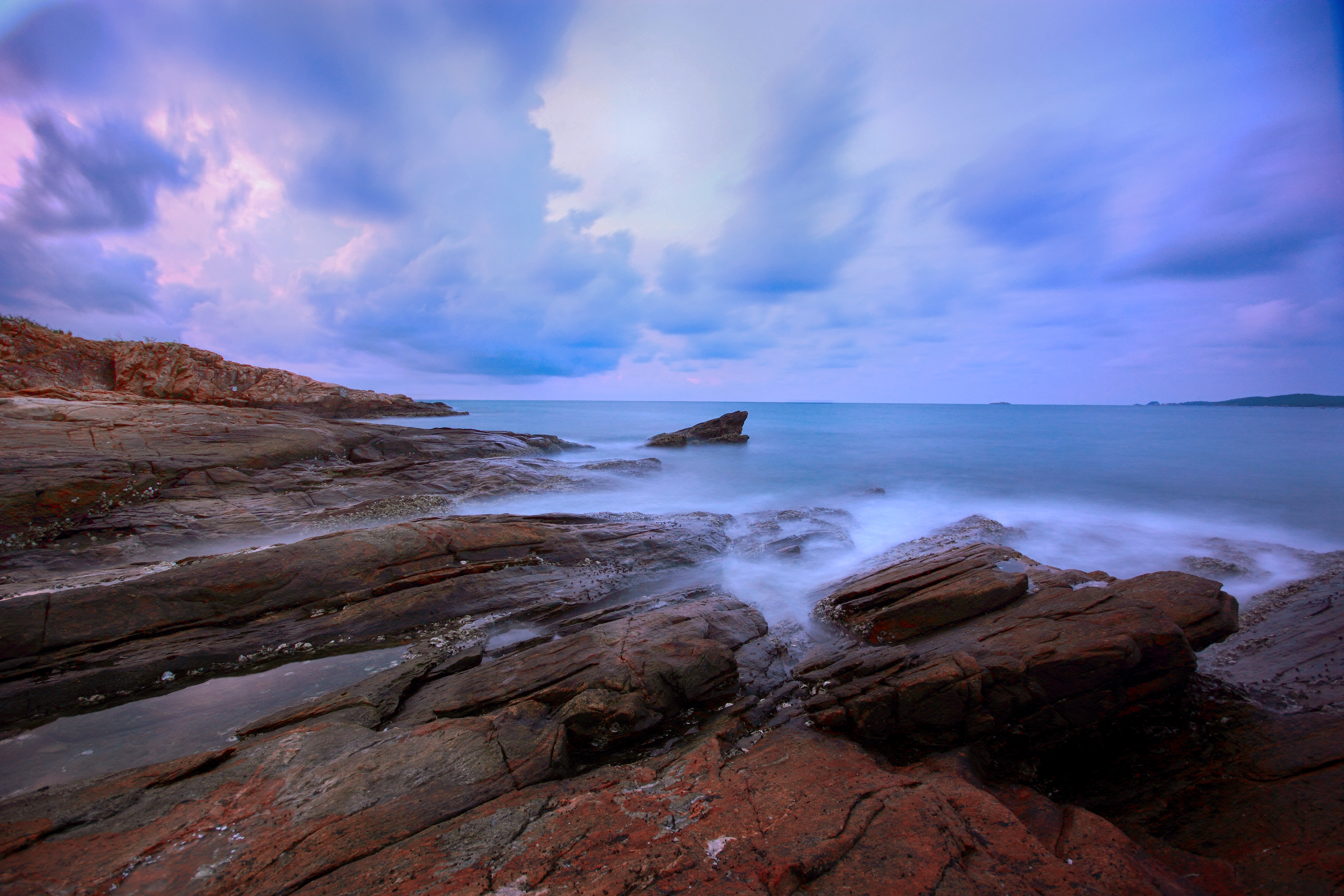
Khao Laem Ya – Mu Ko Samet National Park

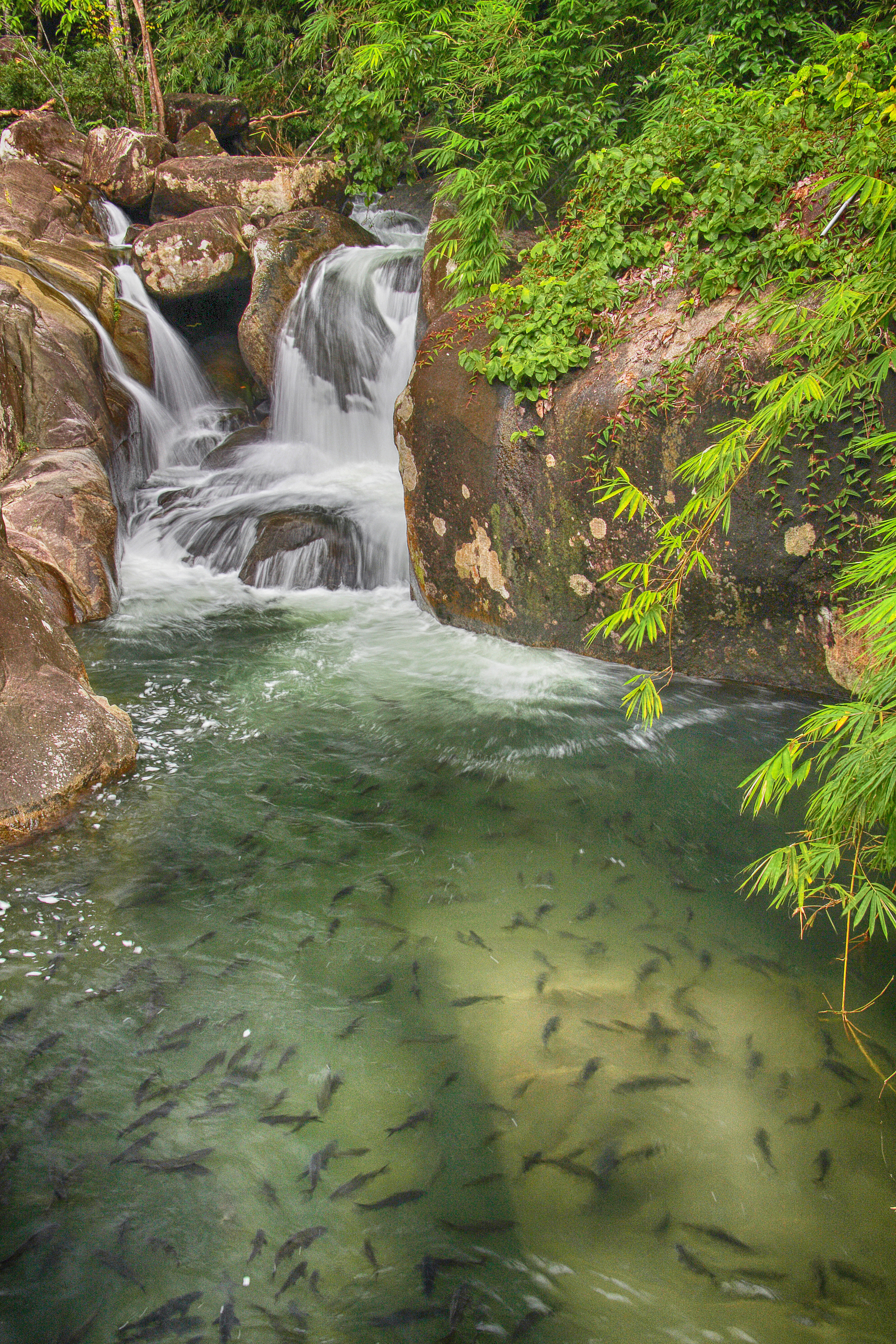
Khao Chamao (Khlong Nam Sai) Waterfall, Khao Chamao–Khao Wong National Park
