= Bo Win =

Place in Chonburi province, Thailand

Coordinates: 13.0362412201°N 101.117286122°E

Bo Win (Thai: บ่อวิน, pronounced [bɔ̀ː wīn]), also written as 'Bowin', is a tambon (subdistrict) of Si Racha District, Chonburi Province, Thailand. It is a small town with a population of 40,000 that is known for its proximity to Pattaya district, and being a small industrial hub that is home to many factories. Bo Win is part of the Eastern Economic Corridor.

== Naming ==
The first element "Bo" (Thai: บ่อ) means 'pothole', and the second element "Win" (Thai: วิน) is a corrupted form of the English word "wheel". The name "Bo Win" is believed to have originated from the area's notoriously rough roads in the past, which were filled with potholes. When vehicles got stuck in these deep potholes or muddy ruts, they had to rely on the wheels themselves, or sometimes on makeshift winching mechanisms that were connected to the wheels, in order to pull the vehicles out. Over time, the name "Bo Win" came to reflect both the condition of the roads and the method used to get through them.

== Geography ==
Bo Win is a southern part in Si Racha District of Chonburi Province close to neighbouring Rayong Province. It is lined midway between Si Racha and Bang Lamung Districts. Its topography is a plain and slope interspersed with high hills and small mountains.

Adjoining subdistricts are, clockwise from north, Nong Kham and Khao Khansong in its district, Map Yang Phon in Pluak Daeng District of Rayong Province, Takhian Tia in Bang Lamung District, Bueng in its district.

== Administration & population ==
The entire area of Bo Win is administered by two local government bodies: Chaophraya Surasak City Municipality and Subdistrict Administrative Organization (SAO) Bo Win.

It was also divided into eight muban (village).

Only the part of the SAO Bo Win covers an area of 39 km^{2} (15 sq mi), with an average population density of 400 people per km^{2} (based on April 2014 data).

In 2017, it had a total population of 40,825.

== Economy ==
Bo Win can be regarded as an industrial estate, part of eastern seaboard, like nearby areas such as Laem Chabang, Map Ta Phut. In its area there are five industrial estates.

Bo Win is also home to many residences in various types such as condominium, housing estate, detached house.

In term of agriculture, pineapple, cassava, and rubber are the cash crops.

== Transportation ==
Highway 331 is a main thoroughfare. The area is also served by minibus or van from Bangkok.
