= Si Racha district =

Si Racha ศรีราชา
- District
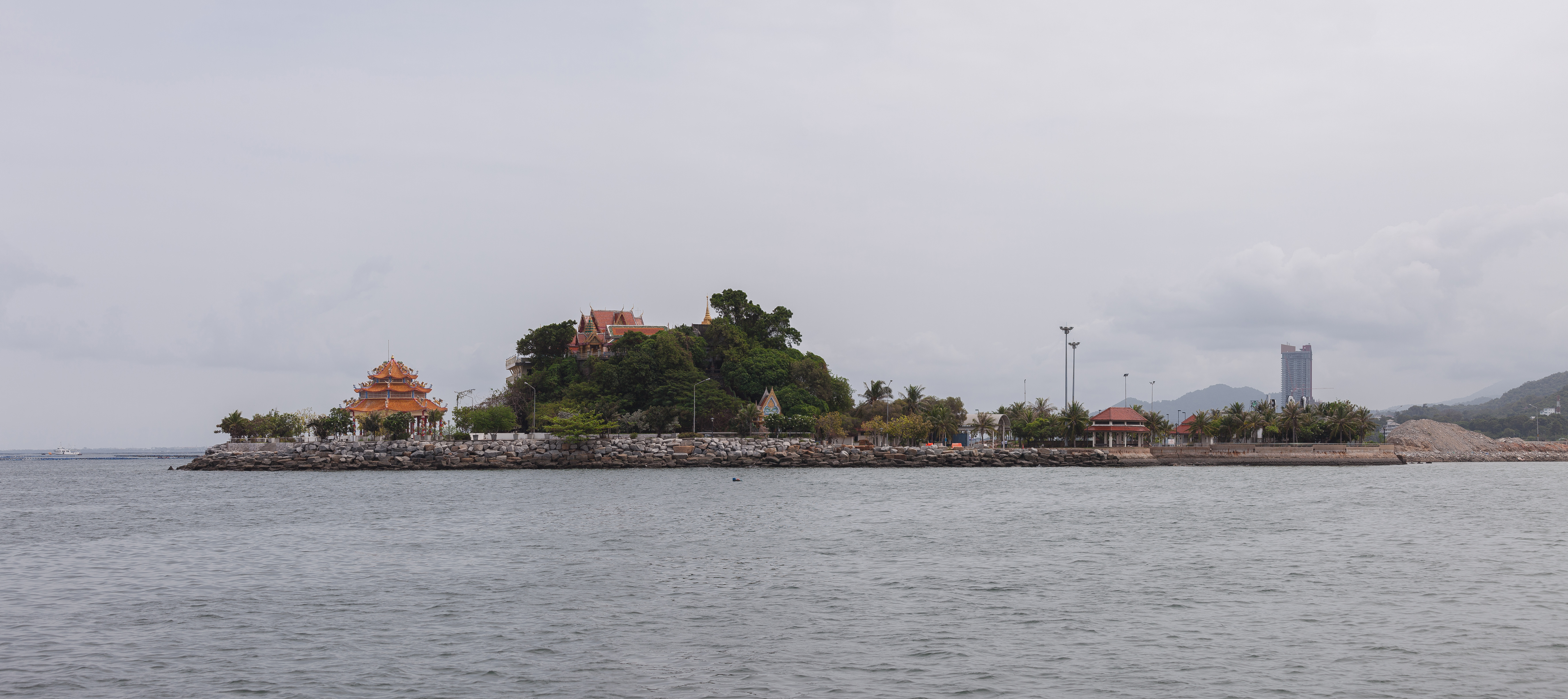
- Ko Loi, Si Racha

- District location in Chonburi province
- Coordinates: 13°10′28″N 100°55′50″E
- Country: Thailand
- Province: Chonburi
- Seat: Si Racha

Area
  - Total: 616.4 km^{2} (238.0 sq mi)

Population (2019)
  - Total: 323,797
  - Density: 525.3/km^{2} (1,361/sq mi)
- Time zone: UTC+7 (ICT)
- Postal code: 20110
- Geocode: 2007

Si Racha (Thai: ศรีราชา, pronounced [sǐː rāː.t͡ɕʰāː]) is a district in Chonburi province, Thailand. Its center is the town of Si Racha, on the Gulf of Thailand, about halfway between Chonburi and Pattaya. The name Si Racha is from Sanskrit Śrī Rāja via Pali.

Si Racha is in an industrial zone consisting of manufacturing and shipping industries, supported by the port of Laem Chabang, 20th largest in the world. With Chonburi to the north and Pattaya, Bang Lamung township, Laem Chabang to the south, it forms the bulk of the economic zone of the eastern seaboard of Thailand, a fast-growing area that is second to only greater Bangkok in population and wealth. Due to its infrastructure, Laem Chabang and the eastern seaboard in general, is the nation's leading entrepôt.

As of 2019 the population of the district was 323,797.

Around the 1930s, Si Racha sea was known as a shark-infested area. They used to attack humans such as villagers, fishermen, and even a German tourist.

Khao Kheow Open Zoo, home of the virally popular Moo Deng pygmy hippopotamus, is located here.

== Geography ==
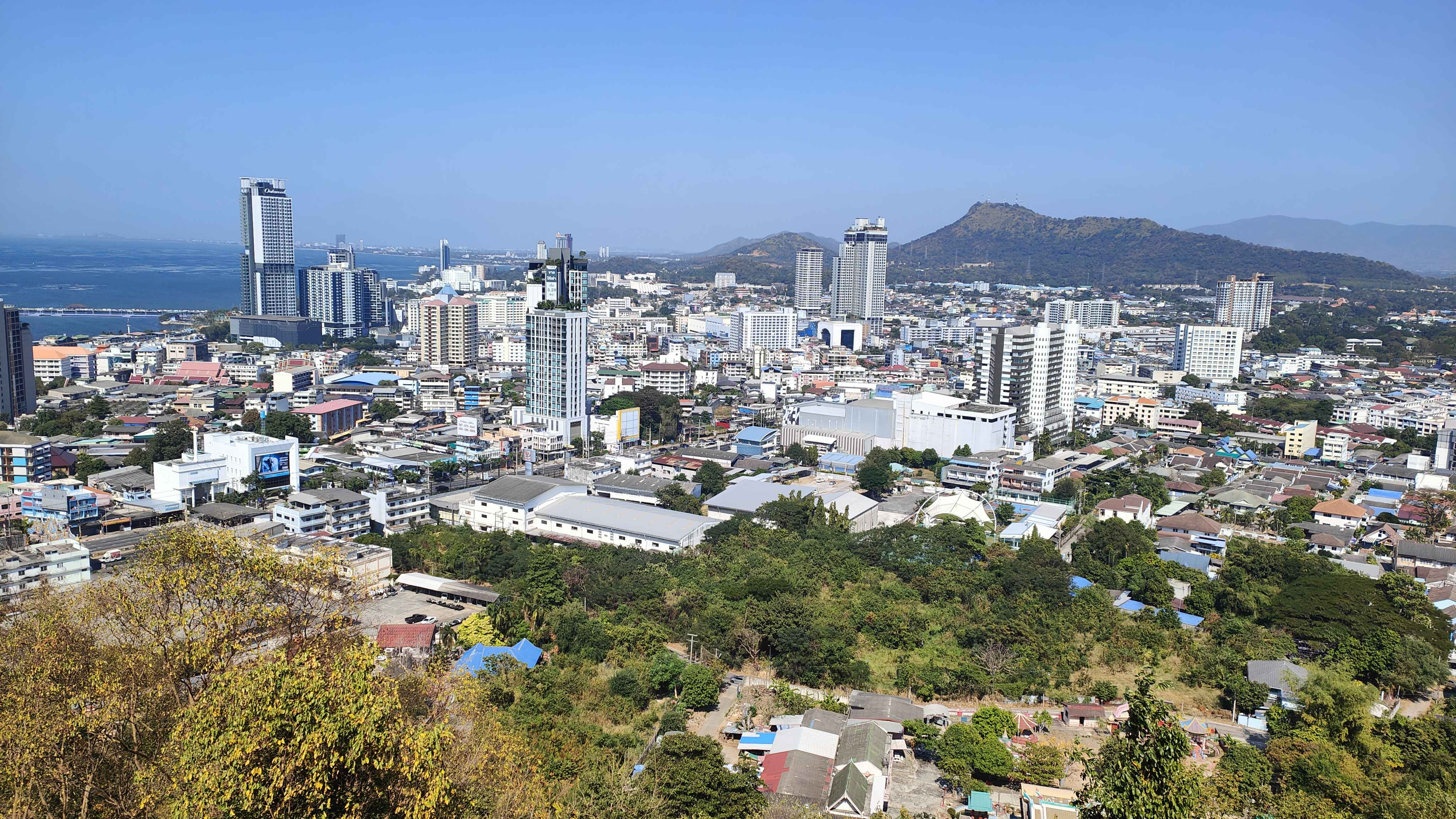
Si Racha city

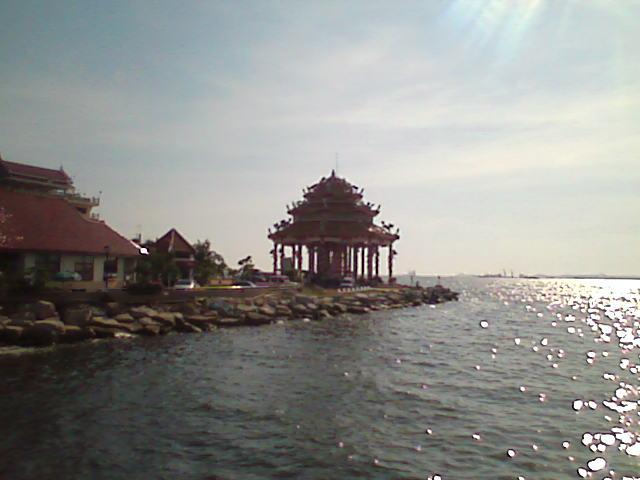
Wat Ko Loi, Si Racha

To the north is Mueang Chonburi district, to the northeast Ban Bueng district, to the southeast Pluak Daeng district of Rayong Province, and to the south is Bang Lamung district.

== Administration ==
=== Central administration ===
Si Racha is divided into eight sub-districts (tambon), which are further subdivided into 72 administrative villages (muban).

Tambon	Thai	Villages	Pop.
Si Racha	ศรีราชา	-	23,927
Surasak	สุรศักดิ์	10	68,293
Thung Sukhla	ทุ่งสุขลา	12	41,580
Bueng	บึง	9	45,724
Nong Kham	หนองขาม	11	47,192
Khao Khansong	เขาคันทรง	10	10,491
Bang Phra	บางพระ	12	31,301
Bo Win	บ่อวิน	8	40,825

=== Local administration ===
There are two cities (thesaban nakhon) in the district:

- Laem Chabang (Thai: เทศบาลนครแหลมฉบัง) consisting of sub-district Thung Sukhla and parts of sub-districts Surasak, Bueng, Nong Kham, and Bang Lamung.
- Chao Phraya Surasak (Thai: เทศบาลนครเจ้าพระยาสุรศักดิ์) consisting of parts of sub-districts Surasak, Bueng, Nong Kham, Khao Khansong, and Bo Win.

There is one town (thesaban mueang) in the district: Si Racha (Thai: เทศบาลเมืองศรีราชา) consisting of sub-district Si Racha, and one sub-district municipality (thesaban tambon), Bang Phra (Thai: เทศบาลตำบลบางพระ) consisting of parts of sub-district Bang Phra.

There are four sub-district administrative organizations (SAO) in the district:

- Nong Kham (Thai: องค์การบริหารส่วนตำบลหนองขาม) consisting of parts of sub-district Nong Kham.
- Khao Khansong (Thai: องค์การบริหารส่วนตำบลเขาคันทรง) consisting of parts of sub-district Khao Khansong.
- Bang Phra (Thai: องค์การบริหารส่วนตำบลบางพระ) consisting of parts of sub-district Bang Phra.
- Bo Win (Thai: องค์การบริหารส่วนตำบลบ่อวิน) consisting of parts of sub-district Bo Win.
