= Chaophraya Surasak =

Coordinates: 13°07′28″N 100°59′57″E

Chaophraya Surasak เจ้าพระยาสุรศักดิ์
- City Municipality
- City of Chaophraya Surasak เทศบาลนครเจ้าพระยาสุรศักดิ์
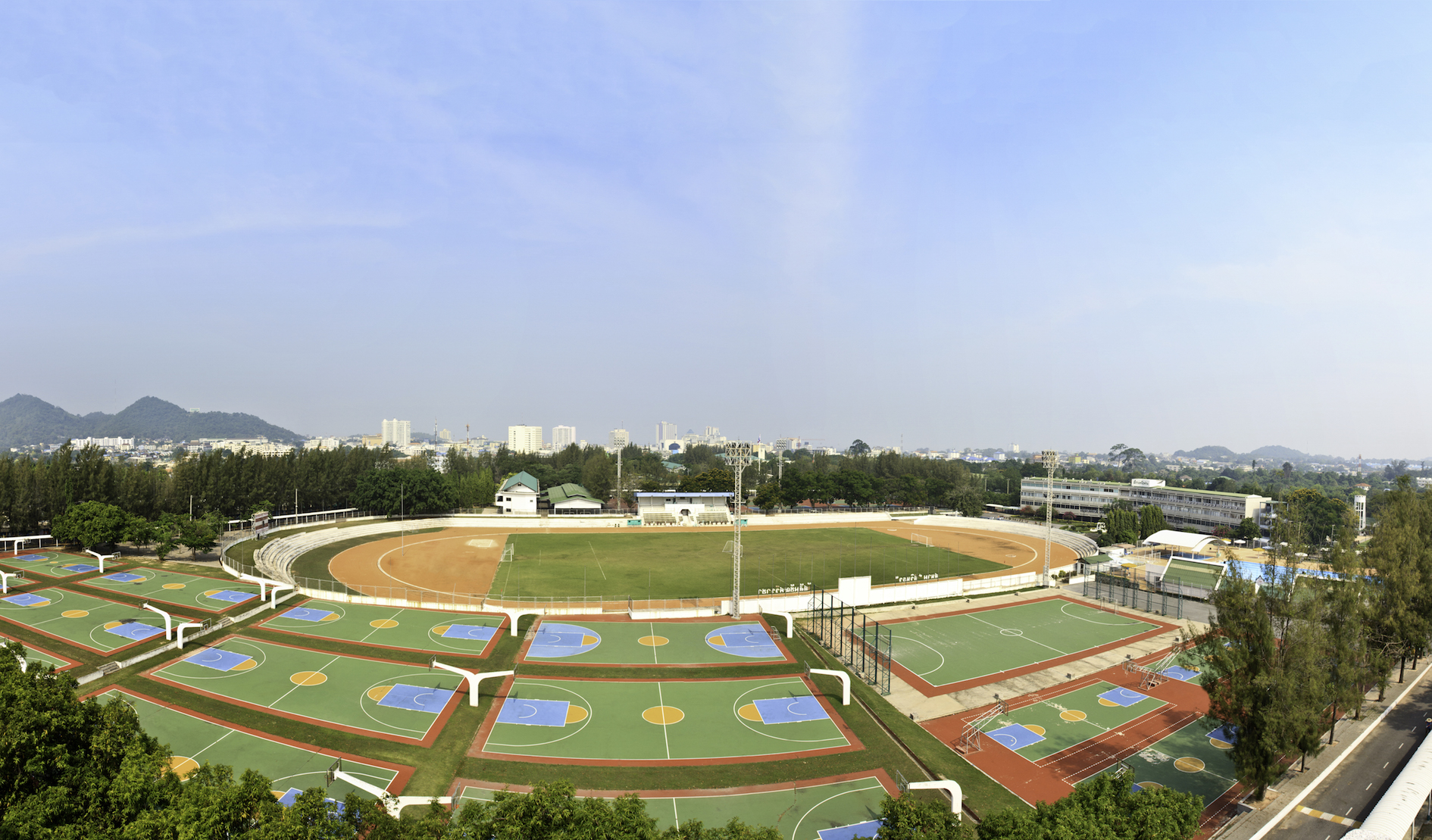
- Srindhorn Stadium, Assumption College Sriracha

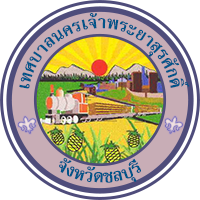
- Seal
- Interactive map of Chaophraya Surasak
- Location in Thailand
- Country: Thailand
- Province: Chonburi
- District: Si Racha
- Sanitation: 12 December 1967
- Subdistrict municipality: 25 May 1999
- City municipality: 26 July 2013
- Named for: Chaophraya Surasakmontri

Government
  - Mayor: Akom Panchalermchai

Area
  - City Municipality: 276.98 km^{2} (106.94 sq mi)
  - Urban: 616.4 km^{2} (238.0 sq mi)
  - Rank: 2nd

Population (2022)
  - City Municipality: 153,687 (Registered residents)
  - Rank: 5th in Thailand
  - Density: 554/km^{2} (1,430/sq mi)
  - Urban: 327,172
- Time zone: UTC+7 (ICT)
- Postcode: 20110
- Calling code: 038
- Website: chaoprayasurasak.go.th/public/

Chaophraya Surasak (Thai: เทศบาลนครเจ้าพระยาสุรศักดิ์) is a city in Chonburi Province, Thailand. It was established as a sanitary district in 1967. In 1999, all sanitary districts were upgraded to subdistrict municipalities (thesaban tambon). In 2013 it was upgraded to a city municipality (thesaban nakhon). As of 2022, it has a population of 153,687. The city covers parts of five subdistricts (tambon) of Si Racha District, the ninth-largest urban city area in Thailand. The city is named after Chaophraya Surasakmontri.

== History ==
Originally named Ao Udom became a sanitation (Sukhaphiban) on 12 December 1967, which covered parts of subdistricts Thung Sukhla and Surasak, Si Racha district, Chonburi province. Later on 6 October 1970 it was enlarged with subdistrict Nong Kham, Bueng district and area of subdistrict Thung Sukhla. On 24 December 1991 the area has been enlarged again and contains five subdistricts, Surasak, Nong Kham, Bueng, Bo Win and Kha Khan Song. The sanitation changed to subdistrict municipality (thesaban tambon) on 24 February 1999, effectively on 25 May 1999. The name changed to Chaophraya Surasak subdistrict municipality on 23 July 2002. The status was upgraded to Chaophraya Surasak city municipality (thesaban nakhon) on 9 April 2013, effectively on 1 May 2013, while the total area was reduced from 306.44 to 276.98 square kilometres (118.32 to 106.94 sq mi).

== Geography ==
=== Location ===
Chaophraya Surasak city municipality (thesaban nakhon) with a total area of 276.98 km^{2} is located on the east coast of Gulf of Thailand. It is about 40 kilometers from Chonburi and 120 kilometers from Bangkok. Chaophraya Surasak borders to the north: subdistricts (tambon) Bang Phra and Nong Kham, district (amphoe) Si Racha, province Chonburi, east: subdistrict Khlon Kio, district Ban Bueng and subdistricts Khao Khan Song and Bo Win, district Si Racha, province Chonburi, south: subdistrict Takhian Tia, district Bang Lamung, province Chonburi, west: Laem Chabang city municipality and Si Racha town municipality (thesaban mueang), district Si Racha, province Chonburi and the Bay of Bangkok.

=== Topography ===
In the east of the Chaophraya Surasak municipality is the Khao Khiao mountain range. The foothills alternate with plains to the sea.

=== Wildlife Sanctuary ===
There is one wildlife sanctuary in Khao Khan Song subdistrict: Khao Khiao - Khao Chomphu Wildlife Sanctuary, 145 km^{2} (56 sq.mi.)

=== Climate ===
Chaophraya Surasak city has a tropical savanna climate (Köppen climate classification category Aw). Winters are dry and warm. Temperatures rise until May. Mansoon season runs from May through October, with heavy rain and somewhat cooler temperatures during the day, although nights remain warm. Weather station Laem Chabang, climate data from 1981 to 2010: The maximum temperature is 39.0 °C (102.2 °F) in January and the minimum temperature is 14.0 °C (57.2 °F) in December. The maximum average temperature is 33.3 °C (91.9 °F) in April and the minimum average temperature is 22.0 °C (71.6 °F) in December. Annual rainfall is 1,151 millimeter (45.3 inch) and in January was for 24 hour the rainfall 176.5 millimeter (7 inch).

=== Water resources ===
There are three water reservoirs:

- Huai Nong Kho, capacity 21,400,000 cub.m.
- Huai Saphan, capacity 7,650,000 cub.m.
- Huai Nong Klang Dong, capacity 3,840,00 cub.m.

Further there is natural stream Huai Lam, consisting of 20 natural places.

== Administration ==
Subdistrict	Villages	Community	People	Households
Surasak	8	17	64,570	46,894
Bueng	6	10	34,730	22,940
Nong Kham	7	8	32,797	21,236
Bo Win	4	6	17,916	14,253
Khao Khansong	4	5	3,674	2,216

The administration of Chaophraya Surasak city municipality is responsible for an area that covers 276.98 square kilometres (106.94 sq mi) and consists of five subdistricts, 29 villages (muban), 46 communities (chumchon), 153,687 people in 107,539 households.

== Religion ==
Temple name	Thai	Subdistrict	Village
Wat Nong Prue	วัดหนองปรือ	Bueng	Moo1
Wat Khao Tabaek	วัดเขาตะแบก	Nong Kham	Moo4
Wat Nong Yai Bu	วัดหนองยายบุ่	Nong Kham	Moo10
Wat Khao Chong Lom	วัดเขาช่องลม	Khao Khan Song	Moo6

As of 2019 95% of the population in Chaophraya Surasak city municipality self-identified as Buddhists of the Theravada Buddhism. There are 32 temples (wat) and seven "samnak song", temples who are not official registered. Muslims comprising 2% of the population with three mosques. Christians represent also 2% of the population with three churches. The remaining 1% of the population are followers of other religions.

== Logo ==
The city logo shows a freight train, which symbolizes industry, buildings that characterize urbanization, pineapples are a reference to agriculture and the mountains in the background pointing to the Khao Khiao mountain range.

== Infrastructure ==
=== Education ===
There are eight early childhood (Kindergarten) schools and 20 schools for basic education: 10 schools with primary 1 to secondary 3 level and 10 schools with primary 1 to secondary 6 level. The city has no vocational or tertiary education.

=== Health ===
There are eight health promoting hospitals; Surasak 1, Bueng 2, Nong Kham 2, Bo Win 1, Khao Khan Song 2.
Further Khao Khan Song has one health center (Chaloem Phra Kiat).

=== Transportation ===
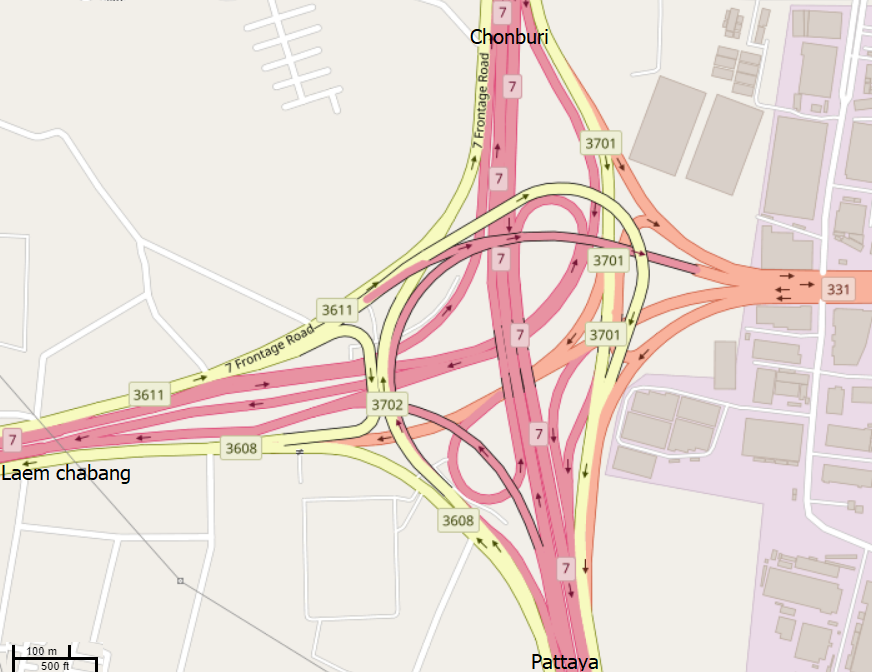
Nong Kham Interchange

There are four major roads in the city:

- Motorway 7 Bangkok - Pattaya - Map Ta Phut
- National highway no.3 (Sukhumvit road) Bangkok - Trat
- Highway no.331 Sattahip (Chonburi province) - Phanom Sarakham (Chachoengsao province)
- National route no.3241 connects highway no.331 with Sukhumvit road

Nong Kham Interchange in motorway 7 is part of the objectives to solve traffic jams to and from the port of Laem Chabang.
In the city, traffic jams will form on most roads due to traveling to and from schools and in the evening due to the number of flea markets on different roads.

=== Waterworks ===
"Si Racha District Waterworks Office" produces 47,000 cub.m./day tapwater, which is used by 30,100 households or 30% of the total area in the municipality.
"Laem Chabang Waterworks Office" produced 59,140 cub.m/day tapwater, which is used by 36,400 households or 13% of the total area in the municipality.
The conclusion is: 38% of the households (41,039) or 57% of the total area in the municipality do not used tapwater.

=== Economy ===
The total area of agricultural land is 76,610 rai ~ 122.6 square kilometres (47.3 sq mi), which accounts for about 44% of the total area in the municipality. The farming mostly delivers tapioca, pineapple, dragon fruit. Animal husbandry consists of seven pig farms and 37 chicken farms. Sriracha Tiger Zoo with an area of 40 ha (100 acres) is in Nong Kham subdistrict. Tourism revenue is 110 million Baht/year. The total number of factories is 214, many of which are concentrated in four "Industrial Estates":

- Pinthong Industrial Estate 1 - 160 ha (400 acres)
- Pinthong Industrial Estate 2 - 120 ha (300 acres)
- Pinthong Industrial Estate 3 - 160 ha (400 acres)
- Bo Win Industrial Estate - 540 ha (1330 acres)
