= Nong Prue =

Nong Prue หนองปรือ
- Thesaban mueang
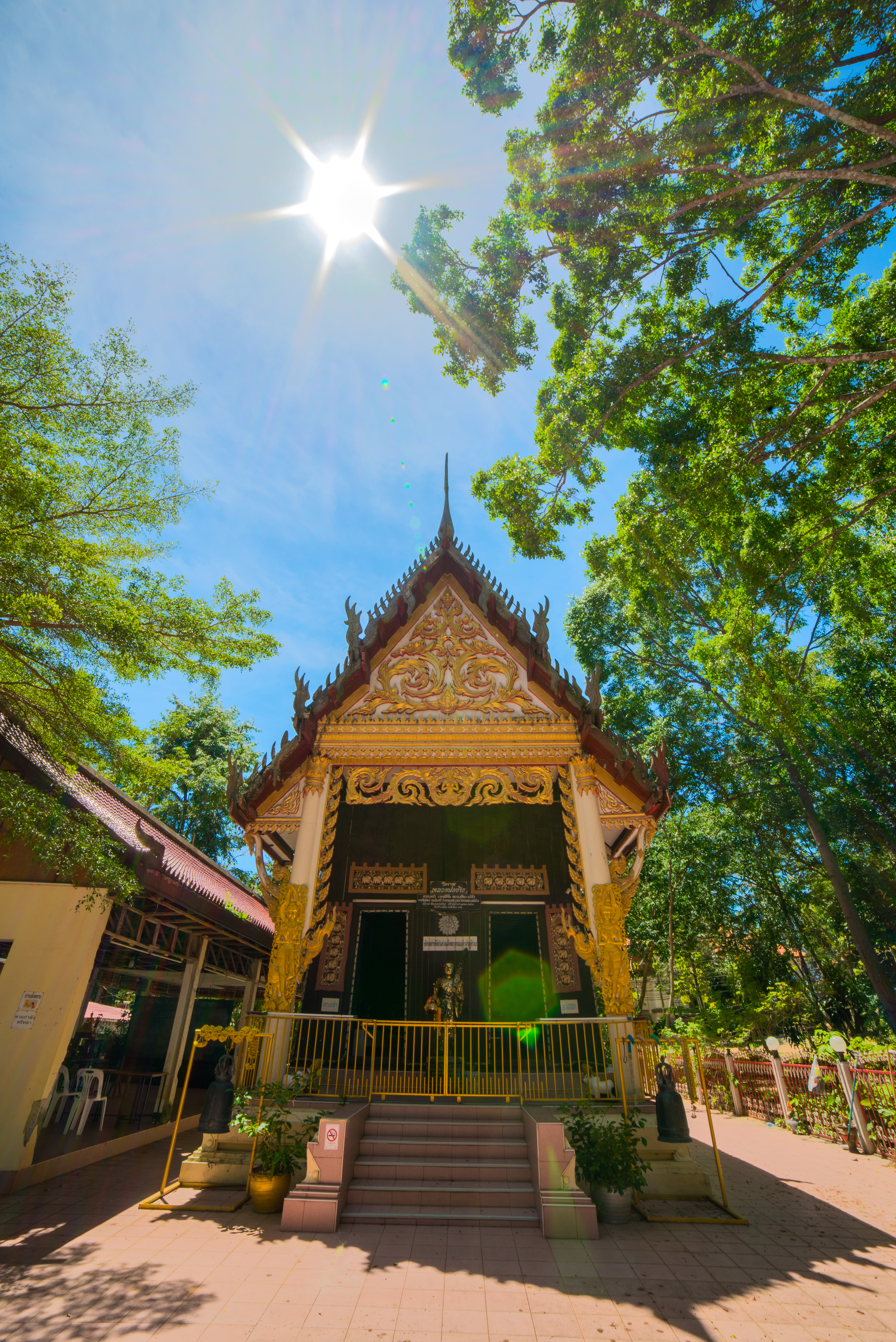
- Wat Nong Prue
- Motto: หลวงพ่อโตคู่บ้าน หลวงพ่อช้างคู่เมือง ลือเลื่องพระเจ้าตาก หลายหลากวัฒนธรรม งามล้ำบุญกองข้าว เรือยาวมาบประชัน แข่งขันวิ่งควาย
- Interactive map of Nong Prue
- Coordinates: 12°55′22″N 100°56′15″E
- Country: Thailand
- Province: Chonburi
- District: Bang Lamung

Population (2017)
  - Total: 79,258
- Time zone: UTC+7 (ICT)
- Website: nongpruecity.go.th

Nong Prue (Thai: หนองปรือ) is a town municipality (thesaban mueang) in the Bang Lamung District of Chon Buri Province, a dormitory suburb of Pattaya, to the direct east (inland), and is home to a growing expatriate and retired population in many gated communities of luxury villas. Its population was 73,901 people in 2010 NSO, and 79,258 by 2017. Separate locally registered population (DLA) figures claim 46,098 for 2015. Like Pattaya, the latter figures probably underestimate the true number of residents, as Thai service workers tend to return to their hometowns where their residence is registered. Both figures likely do not include expats from mostly wealthy nations, nor migrants from neighboring countries who increasingly take up jobs Thais do not want and/or are not accustomed to. (Though ASEAN migrants have been increasingly regularized since about 2014.)

It will be the location of the new high-speed rail station for Pattaya.
