= Bang Lamung township =

Township in Chon Buri province, Thailand

Coordinates: 13.04704°N 100.92891°E

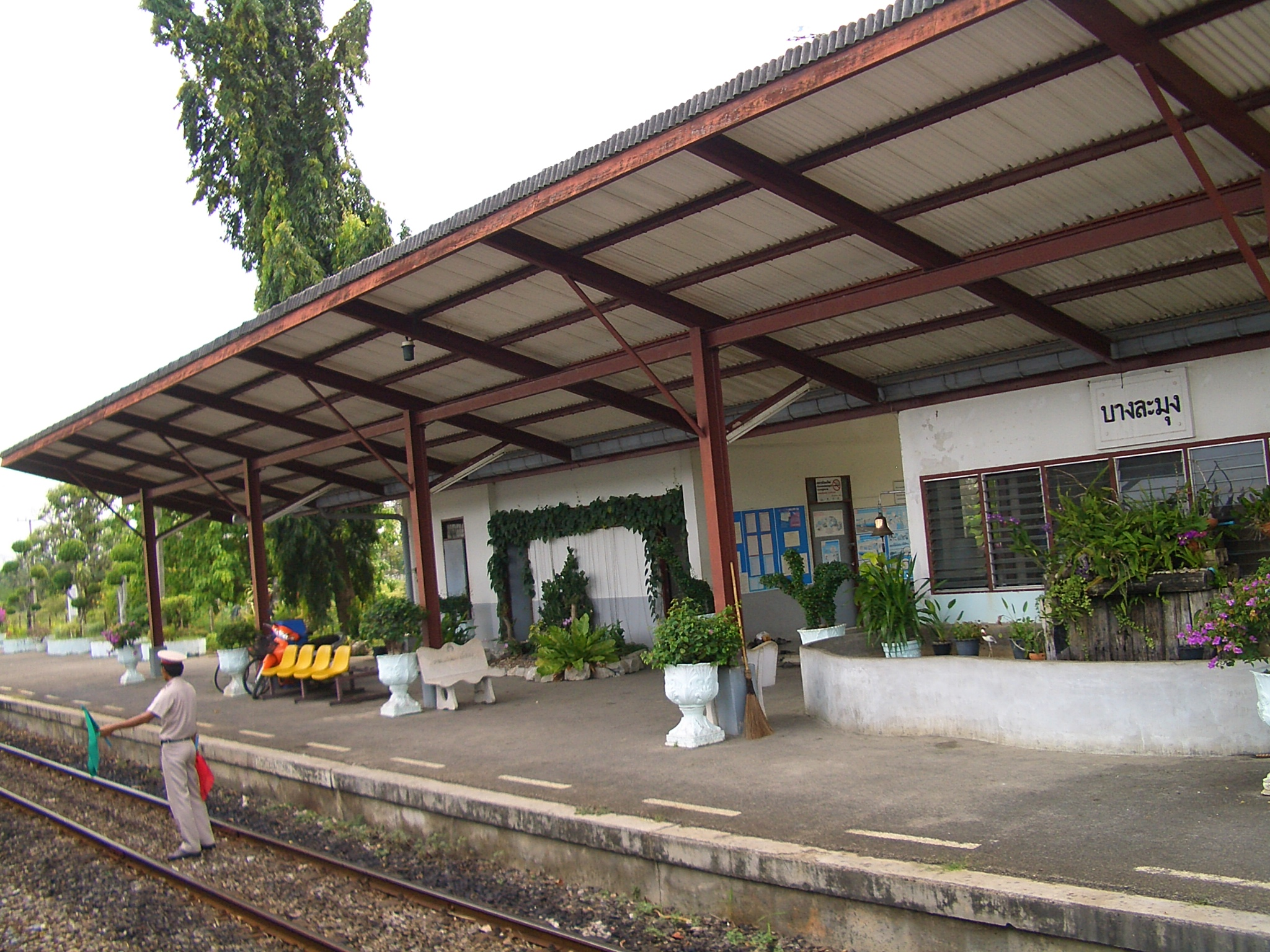
Bang Lamung station is served by Pattaya-Bangkok trains

Bang Lamung (Thai: บางละมุง; IPA: [bāːŋ lāmūŋ]) is a township (thesaban tambon) in Bang Lamung district, Chonburi province, Thailand. Bang Lamung covers parts of the tambon Bang Lamung, Nong Pla Lai and Takhian Tia. As of 2006, it had a population of 9,170.

The town is not far from Laem Chabang and Pattaya. Sukhumvit Road passes through the town.
