= Bang Lamung district =

Bang Lamung บางละมุง
- District
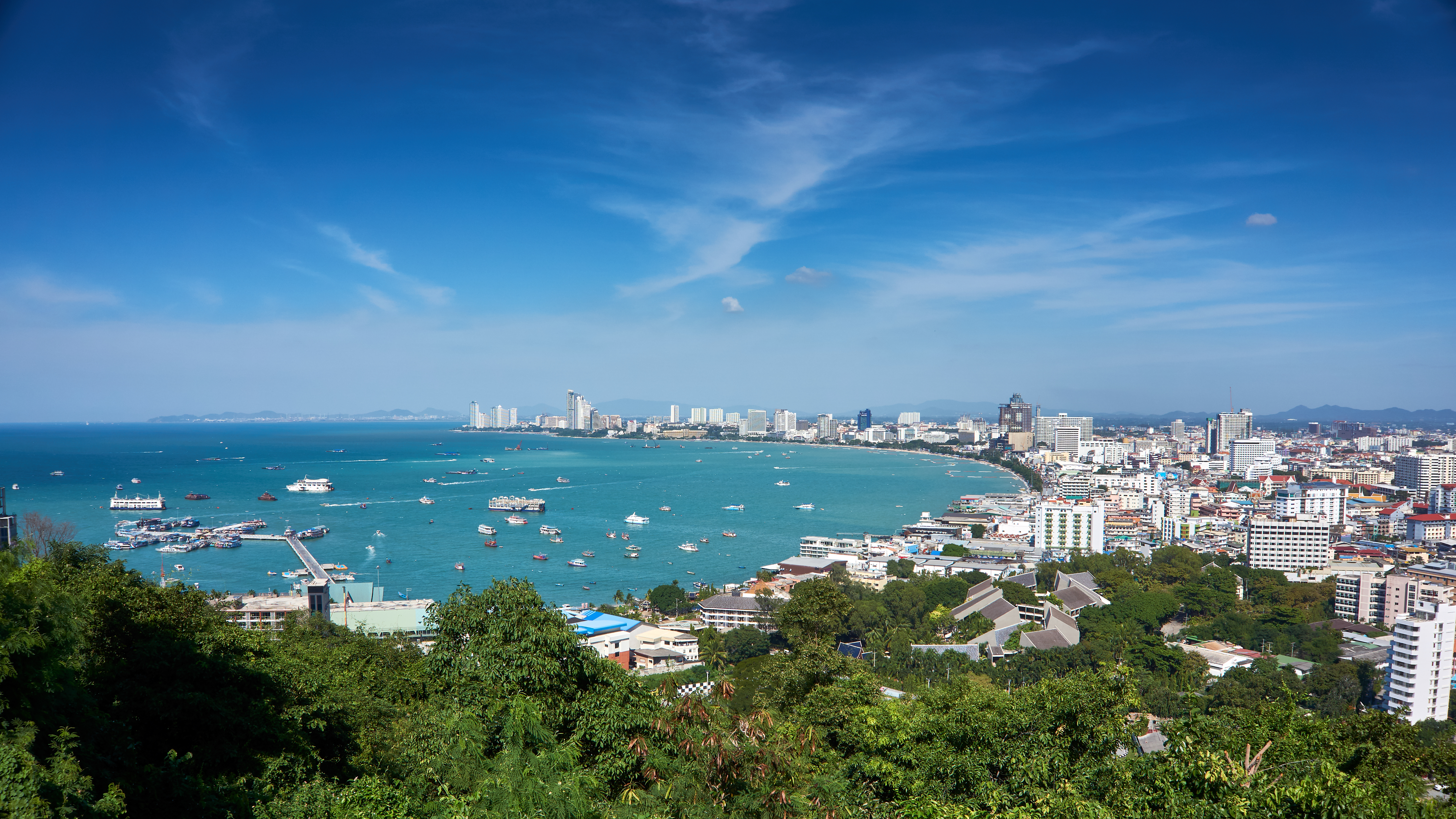
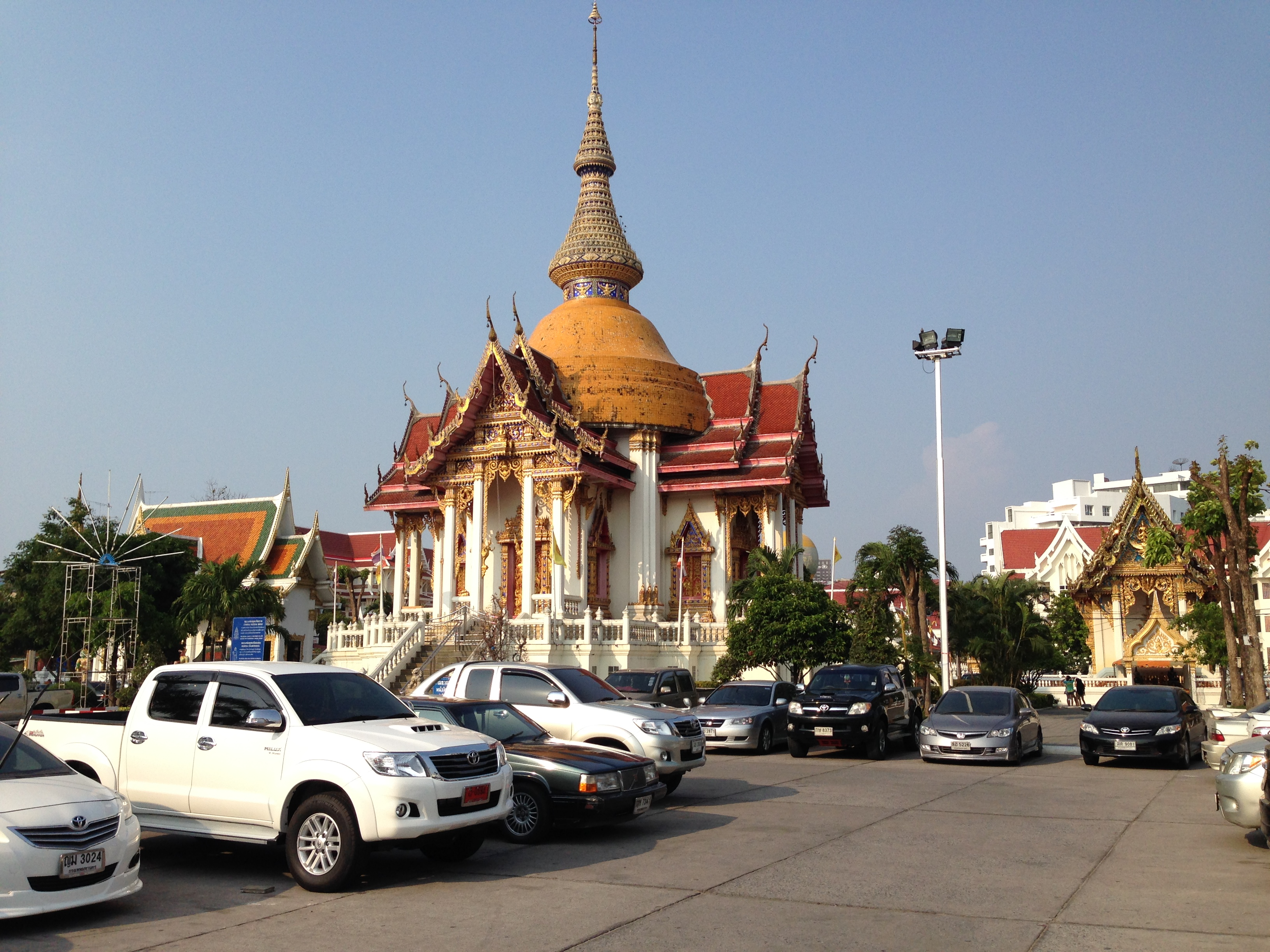
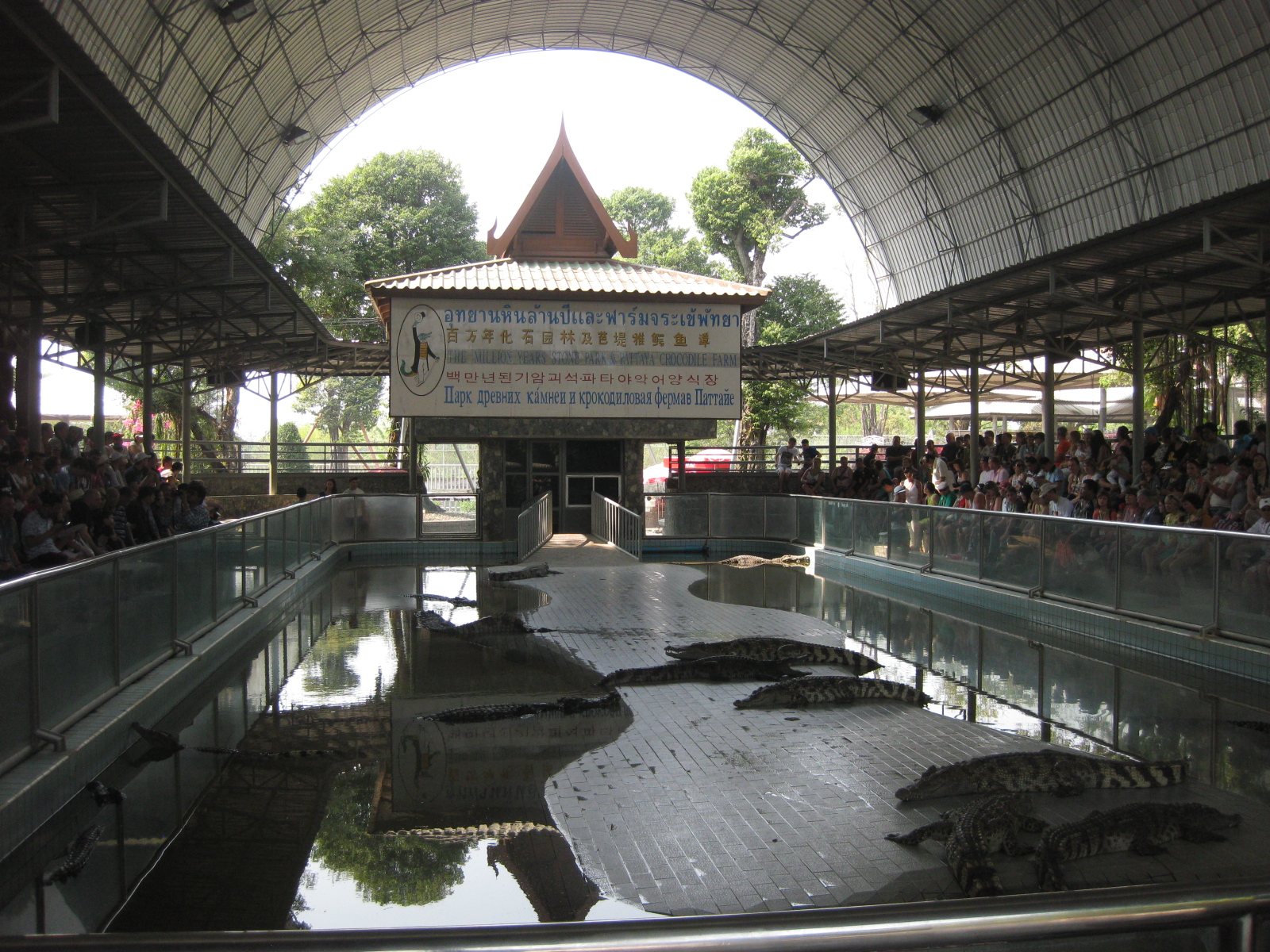
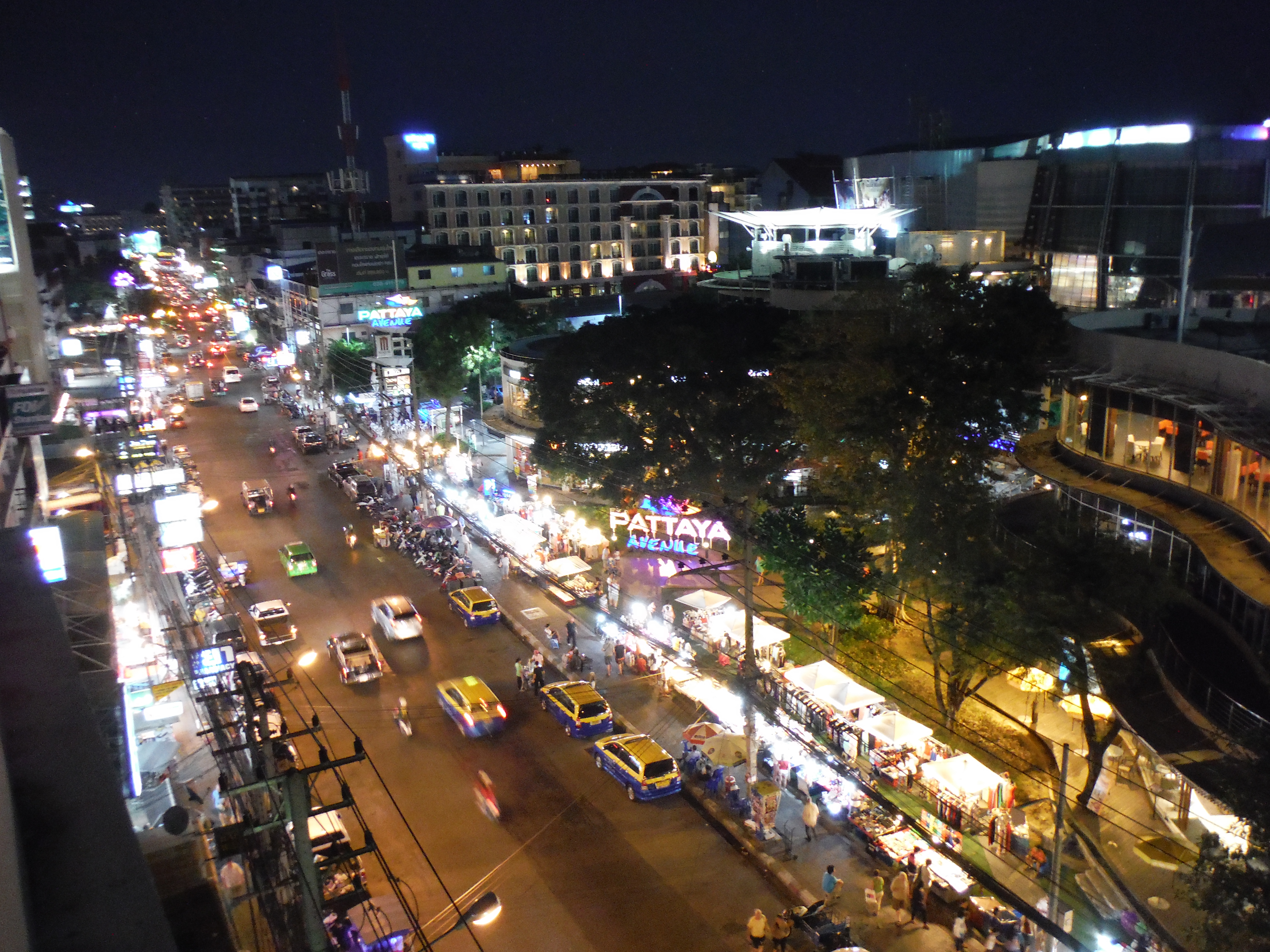
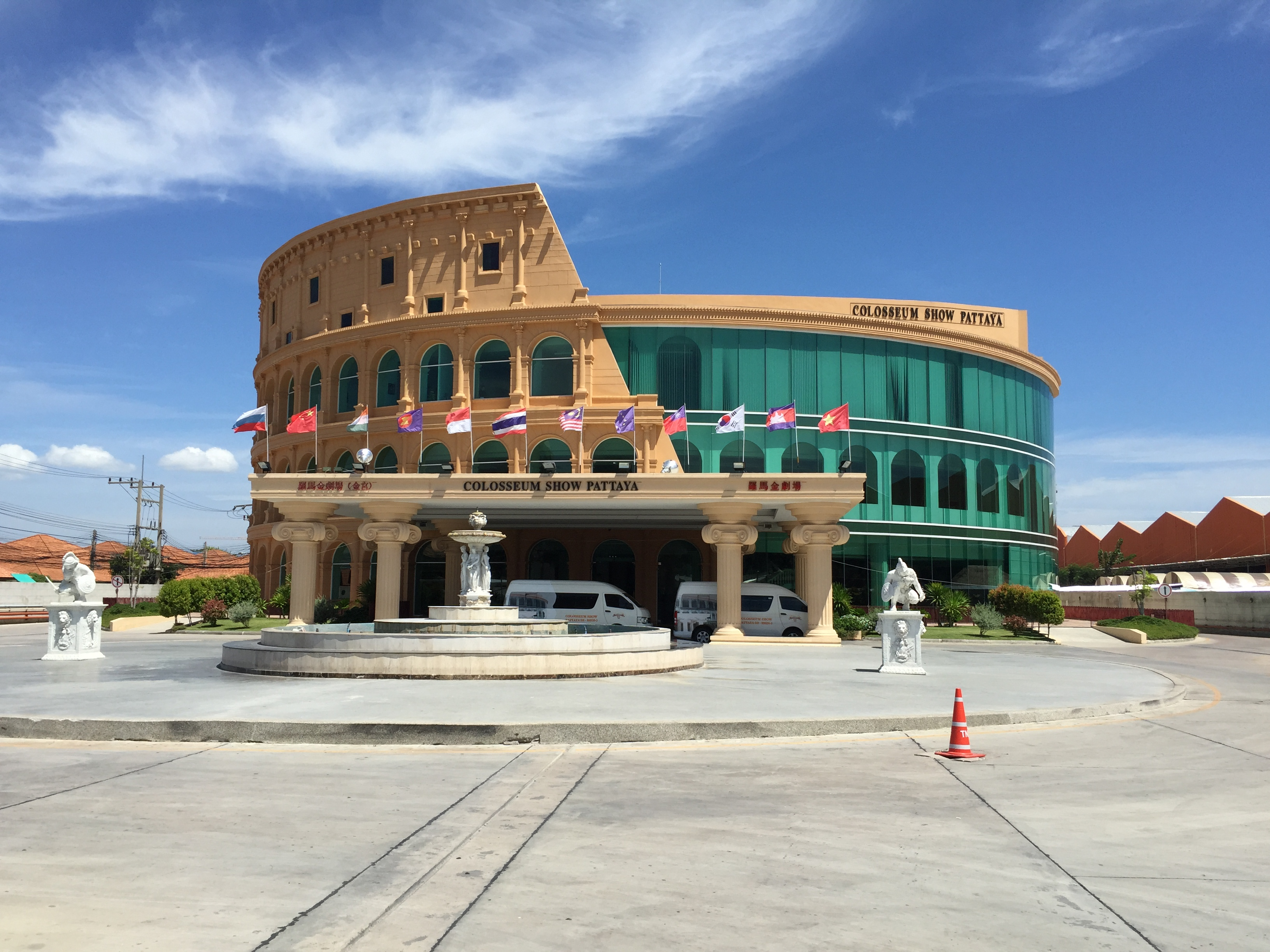
- Clockwise from top: view of Pattaya from the Big Buddha temple; crocodiles at Million stones park and crocodile farm; colosseum park Pattaya; Sai Song road in Pattaya; Wat Chai Mongkhon in Na Kluea

- District location in Chonburi province
- Coordinates: 12°58′36″N 100°54′48″E
- Country: Thailand
- Province: Chonburi
- Seat: Na Kluea

Area
  - Total: 727 km^{2} (281 sq mi)

Population (2015)
  - Total: 293,070
  - Density: 403.12/km^{2} (1,044.1/sq mi)
- Time zone: UTC+7 (ICT)
- Postal code: 20150
- Geocode: 2004

Oceanfront, Bang Lamung District, Chon Buri Thailand

Bang Lamung (Thai: บางละมุง, pronounced [bāːŋ lā.mūŋ]) is a district (amphoe) in the southern part of Chonburi province, Thailand. Bang Lamung includes Pattaya City, a special local government organization within the district area.

== History ==
Mueang Bang Lamung was formerly in Ban Bang Lamung, Tambon Bang Lamung. However, the government downgraded Bang Lamung to a district, with the district office on the banks of Khlong Nok Yang. In 1909, the district head, Phraya Sattaya Nukun (Choem), moved the district office to the seacoast in Tambon Na Kluea.

On 21 October 1952 the district office was completely destroyed by a storm. The office set up temporarily in Bang Lamung School, Sukhumvit Road. The following year the Thai government approved building a new district office near the school. It is still in use today.

During September 2023, the district experienced a surge in dengue fever, recording two deaths. Along with dengue fever, Bang Lamung is also experiencing a surge in Mpox cases, with the district recording 26 cases September 6.

== Geography ==
Neighboring districts are (from the north clockwise) Si Racha of Chonburi Province, Pluak Daeng, Nikhom Phatthana, Ban Chang of Rayong province, Sattahip of Chonburi Province and the Gulf of Thailand. The islands of Ko Lan and Ko Phai are in this district.

== Administration ==
The district is divided into eight sub-districts (tambons), which are further subdivided into 61 villages (mubans). The city of Pattaya is a special municipal area which covers the whole tambon Nong Prue and Na Kluea and parts of Huai Yai and Nong Pla Lai. There are a further two townships (thesaban tambon): Bang Lamung and Laem Chabang. Laem Chabang covers parts of tambon Bang Lamung, and of neighboring Si Racha the complete tambon Bueng, Sura Sak, Thung Su Khla and parts of Nong Kham. Bang Lamung covers parts of the tambon Bang Lamung, Nong Pla Lai, and Takhian Tia. The non-municipal area is administrated by five tambon administrative organizations (TAO).

No.	Name	Thai	Pop.
1.	Bang Lamung	บางละมุง	15,329
2.	Nong Prue	หนองปรือ	100,323
3.	Nong Pla Lai	หนองปลาไหล	12,024
4.	Pong	โป่ง	7,000
5.	Khao Mai Kaeo	เขาไม้แก้ว	5,057
6.	Huai Yai	ห้วยใหญ่	21,365
7.	Takhian Tia	ตะเคียนเตี้ย	12,657
8.	Na Kluea	นาเกลือ	38,831
