= Laem Chabang =

Laem Chabang แหลมฉบัง
- City Municipality
- City of Laem Chabang เทศบาลนครแหลมฉบัง
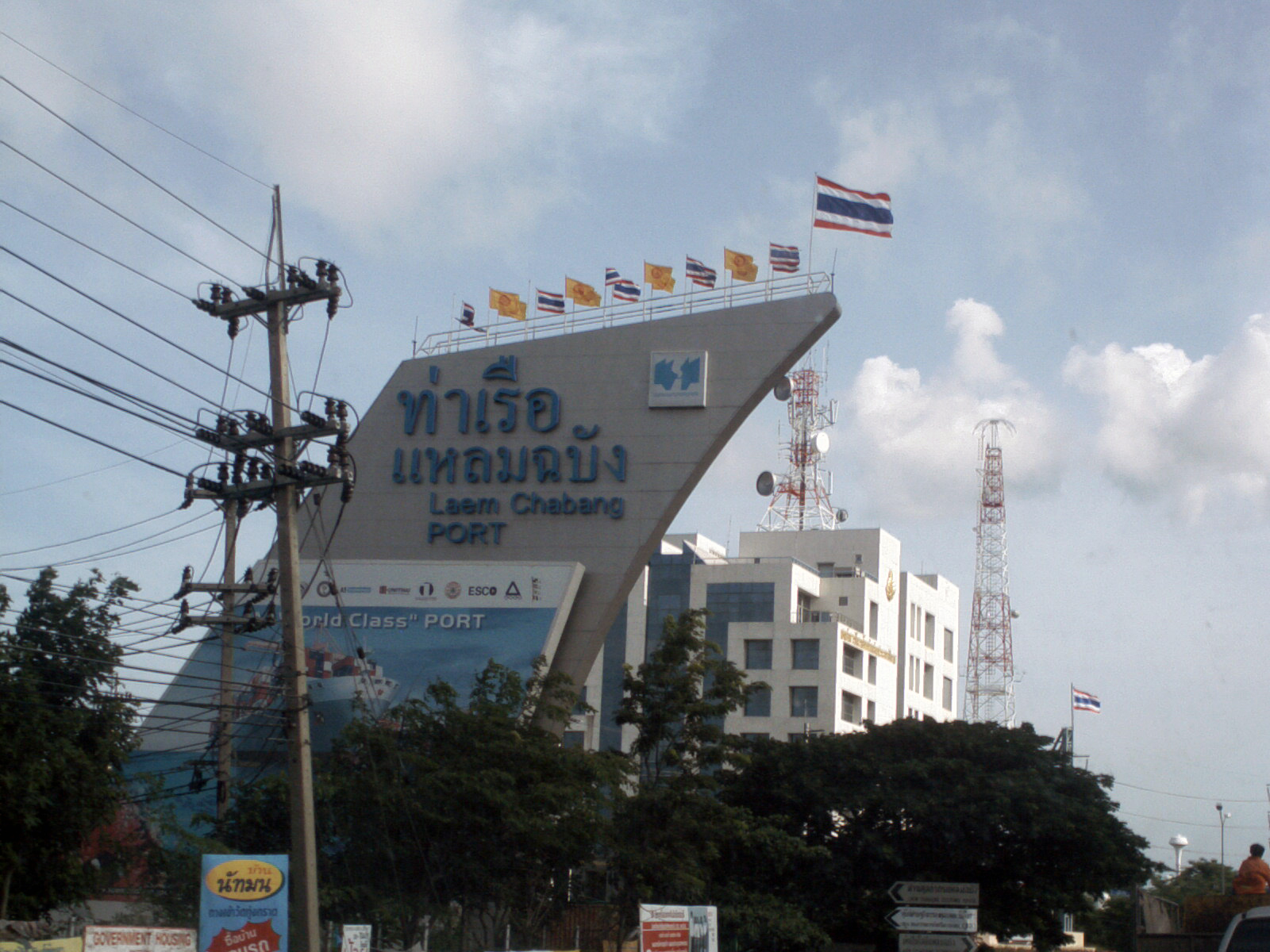
- Entrance to the port in 2005

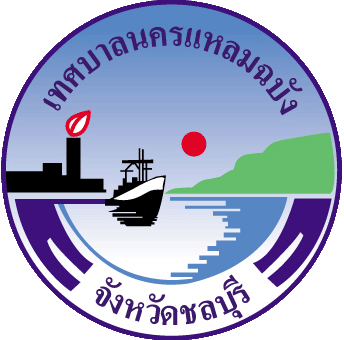
- Seal
- Interactive map of Laem Chabang
- Location in Bay of Bangkok Location in Thailand
- Coordinates: 13°05′16.7″N 100°55′32.6″E
- Country: Thailand
- Province: Chonburi
- District: Si Racha
- Subdistrict municipality: 3 January 1992
- City municipality: 24 May 2010

Government
  - Type: City municipality
  - Mayor: Jinda Thanomrod

Area
  - Total: 88.59 km^{2} (34.20 sq mi)
  - Water: 21.06 km^{2} (8.13 sq mi)

Population (2019)
  - Total: 88,271
  - Density: 996/km^{2} (2,580/sq mi)
- 60,000 people are not registered
- Time zone: UTC+7 (ICT)
- Postcode: 20230
- Calling code: (+66) 38
- Website: lcb.go.th

Laem Chabang (Thai: แหลมฉบัง, pronounced [lɛ̌ːm tɕʰābāŋ]) is a port city municipality (thesaban nakhon) in Si Racha and Bang Lamung districts of Chonburi Province, Thailand. It includes Thung Sukhla subdistrict (tambon) and parts of subdistricts Bueng, Nong Kham and Surasak of Si Racha District and part of Bang Lamung township of Bang Lamung District. As of 2019 it had a population of 88,271. The city has grown up around the port, but also serves as a major stop on the coastal highway linking Pattaya and Bangkok via Sukhumvit Road (Hwy 3). The city is also known for hosting a Japanese retirement community with specialty stores geared towards them.

== History ==
Since 1981 the National Economic and Social Development Board (NESDB) has defined Laem Chabang as a target area for the development into a new urban community by constructing and developing infrastructure and public utilities to support the expansion of the community resulting from the development. Industry by carrying out the construction of an international deep sea port. Industrial estates for export. Construction of the Laem Chabang Port. Railway to connect with the Bangkok-Sattahip Port Railway. Realisation of Laem Chabang Community Housing Building.
According to the Eastern Seaboard Development Project the area consists of the whole Thung Sukhla subdistrict and some areas of Surasak subdistrict, Nong Kham subdistrict, Bueng subdistrict and Bang Lamung subdistrict. Development of the port complex started in 1988. The container port was completed in 1991.
By raising the status of some areas of Ao Udom sanitation district (sukhaphiban), Laem Chabang subdistrict municipality (thesaban tambon), Si Racha district and Bang Lamung district, Chonburi province was established, announced in the Government Gazette, book 108, issue 211, dated 4 December 1991, effective from 3 January 1992. To be a local government organization that controls and enforces the urban development plan. As well as being an agency that provides social services to the community. Conduct business of various industries with the people to rule and take care. Upholding their localities according to the municipal system.
Subsequently Laem Chabang city municipality (thesaban nakhon) was established on 24 May 2010.

The port is part of the Belt and Road Initiative that runs from the Chinese coast to the south via Singapore through the Strait of Malacca towards the southern tip of India, via Mombasa through the Suez Canal to the Mediterranean, there to the Upper Adriatic region to the northern Italian hub of Trieste with its rail connections to Central Europe and the North Sea.

== Geography ==
The area of Laem Chabang city municipality is generally coastal and is located on the east of Gulf of Thailand about 120 km (75 mi) from Suvarnabhumi Airport, 30 km (19 mi) south of Chonburi, 25 km (16 mi) north of Pattaya and 60 km (37 mi) from Map Ta Phut and covers an area of 109.65 km^{2} (42.34 sq mi) of which 88.59 km^{2} (34.20 sq mi) land area and 21.06 km^{2} (8.13 sq mi) water surface (sea). It is in the development zone under the Eastern Seaboard Development Project, consists of a commercial port, industrial estate centers, playgrounds, sports fields, etc.
Laem Chabang borders to the north: Surasak subdistrict (tambon), Si Racha district (amphoe), Chonburi province (changwat), east: subdistricts Nong Kham and Bueng, Si Racha district, Chonburi province, south: Bang Lamung subdistrict, Bang Lamung district, Chonburi province, west: Gulf of Thailand.

== Climate ==
Laem Chabang city has a tropical savanna climate (Köppen climate classification category Aw). Winters are dry and warm. Temperatures rise until May. Monsoon season runs from May through October, with heavy rain and somewhat cooler temperatures during the day, although nights remain warm. Weather station Laem Chabang, climate data from 1981 to 2010: The maximum temperature is 39.0 °C (102.2 °F) in January and the minimum temperature is 14.0 °C (57.2 °F) in December. The maximum average temperature is 33.3 °C (91.9 °F) in April and the minimum average temperature is 22.0 °C (71.6 °F) in December. Annual rainfall is 1,151 millimeters (45.3 inches).

Climate data for Laem Chabang (1981–2010, extremes 1992-present)
Month	Jan	Feb	Mar	Apr	May	Jun	Jul	Aug	Sep	Oct	Nov	Dec	Year
Record high °C (°F)	39.0 (102.2)	38.0 (100.4)	38.0 (100.4)	39.2 (102.6)	40.1 (104.2)	36.8 (98.2)	36.2 (97.2)	36.7 (98.1)	34.9 (94.8)	35.0 (95.0)	36.5 (97.7)	36.5 (97.7)	40.1 (104.2)
Mean daily maximum °C (°F)	31.9 (89.4)	32.1 (89.8)	32.7 (90.9)	33.3 (91.9)	32.7 (90.9)	31.9 (89.4)	31.4 (88.5)	31.4 (88.5)	31.2 (88.2)	31.4 (88.5)	31.8 (89.2)	31.6 (88.9)	32.0 (89.6)
Daily mean °C (°F)	27.9 (82.2)	28.3 (82.9)	29.0 (84.2)	29.7 (85.5)	29.5 (85.1)	29.1 (84.4)	28.7 (83.7)	28.7 (83.7)	28.5 (83.3)	28.2 (82.8)	28.4 (83.1)	28.1 (82.6)	28.7 (83.7)
Mean daily minimum °C (°F)	22.1 (71.8)	23.2 (73.8)	24.4 (75.9)	25.5 (77.9)	25.5 (77.9)	25.5 (77.9)	25.5 (77.9)	25.0 (77.0)	24.3 (75.7)	23.8 (74.8)	23.3 (73.9)	22.0 (71.6)	24.2 (75.6)
Record low °C (°F)	14.9 (58.8)	13.8 (56.8)	19.0 (66.2)	19.2 (66.6)	19.2 (66.6)	20.0 (68.0)	20.1 (68.2)	21.0 (69.8)	19.6 (67.3)	20.0 (68.0)	17.0 (62.6)	14.0 (57.2)	13.8 (56.8)
Average rainfall mm (inches)	20.9 (0.82)	15.2 (0.60)	52.9 (2.08)	61.5 (2.42)	137.2 (5.40)	153.0 (6.02)	104.9 (4.13)	116.4 (4.58)	247.3 (9.74)	200.3 (7.89)	33.6 (1.32)	8.2 (0.32)	1,151.4 (45.33)
Average rainy days	1.5	2.3	4.6	6.5	12.3	12.9	11.8	13.4	17.0	16.9	4.2	1.1	104.5
Average relative humidity (%)	64	72	73	74	76	76	76	76	78	78	65	61	72
Mean monthly sunshine hours	192.2	163.9	186.0	186.0	117.8	114.0	117.8	114.7	108.0	108.5	171.0	192.2	1,772.1
Mean daily sunshine hours	6.2	5.8	6.0	6.2	3.8	3.8	3.8	3.7	3.6	3.5	5.7	6.2	4.9
Source 1: Thai Meteorological Department
Source 2: Office of Water Management and Hydrology, Royal Irrigation Department (sun and humidity)

== Administration ==
The administration of Laem Chabang city municipality is responsible for a land area that covers 88.59 km^{2} (34.20 sq mi) of which 72.56 km^{2} (28.02 sq mi) in Si Racha district, Chonburi province (82%) and 16.03 km^{2} (6.19 sq mi) in Bang Lamung district, Chonburi province (18%). Consists of five subdistricts, 24 villages, 88,271 people in 79,703 households (following House Registration Office). The latent population, who came to work in various establishments, without moving house registration is approximately 60,000 people.

Laem Chabang city minicipality with subdistricts

District	Subdistrict	Village	People	H.holds
Si Racha	Thung Sukhla	Moo1	2,871	1,463
Si Racha	Thung Sukhla	Moo2	1,134	1,360
Si Racha	Thung Sukhla	Moo3	1,819	665
Si Racha	Thung Sukhla	Moo4	15	40
Si Racha	Thung Sukhla	Moo5	678	1,096
Si Racha	Thung Sukhla	Moo6	7,472	5,731
Si Racha	Thung Sukhla	Moo7	3,503	3,926
Si Racha	Thung Sukhla	Moo8	3,452	3,725
Si Racha	Thung Sukhla	Moo9	4,967	6,959
Si Racha	Thung Sukhla	Moo10	8,379	8,307
Si Racha	Thung Sukhla	Moo11	4,203	2,904
Si Racha	Thung Sukhla	Moo12	3,087	2,316
Si Racha	Thung Sukhla	Subtotal	41,580	38,492
Si Racha	Nong Kham	Moo11	11,716	13,926
Si Racha	Nong Kham	Subtotal	11,716	13,926

District	Subdistrict	Village	People	H.holds
Si Racha	Surasak	Moo3	3,068	2,229
Si Racha	Surasak	Moo9	1,946	1,265
Si Racha	Surasak	Subtotal	5,014	3,494
Si Racha	Bueng	Moo1	3,403	1,964
Si Racha	Bueng	Moo5	3,259	1,695
Si Racha	Bueng	Moo9	2,881	1,250
Si Racha	Bueng	Moo10	5,954	3,725
Si Racha	Bueng	Subtotal	15,497	8,634
Bang Lamung	Bang Lamung	Moo4	3,351	2,257
Bang Lamung	Bang Lamung	Moo6	3,238	6,428
Bang Lamung	Bang Lamung	Moo7	1,329	656
Bang Lamung	Bang Lamung	Moo8	5,684	5,539
Bang Lamung	Bang Lamung	Moo9	862	277
Bang Lamung	Bang Lamung	Subtotal	14,464	15,157
		TOTAL	88,271	79,703

== Logo ==
The city logo shows a ship, which symbolizes an international commercial port, the chimney characterizes an industrial city, the mountain points to the location of the municipality, the sun means glory.

== Religious places ==
Laem Chabang city municipality is home to the following active temples, where Theravada Buddhism is practiced by local residents:

Temple name	Thai	Location
Wat Ban Na Kao	วัดบ้านนาเก่า	Thung Sukhla
Wat Laem Chabang (new)	วัดแหลมฉบัง (ใหม่)	Thung Sukhla
Wat Laem Chabang (old)	วัดแหลมฉบัง (เก่า)	Thung Sukhla
Wat Mai Noen Phayom	วัดใหม่เนินพยอม	Thung Sukhla
Wat Manorom	วัดมโนรม	Thung Sukhla
Wat Noen Bunyaram	วัดเนินบุญญาราม	Thung Sukhla
Wat Phra Prathanpon	วัดพระประทานพร	Surasak
Wat Si Thammaram	วัดศรีธรรมมาราม	Surasak
Wat Laem Thong	วัดแหลมทอง	Nong Kham
Wat Prachanat	วัดปชานาถ	Nong Kham
Wat Nong Khla	วัดหนองคล้า	Bueng
Wat Bang Lamung	วัดบางละมุง	Bang Lamung
Wat Si Wanaram	วัดศรีวนาราม	Bang Lamung
Wat Sukree Bunyaram	วัดสุกรีย์บุญญาราม	Bang Lamung

Shrines in the city municipality are:

- Chao Pho Komin Shrine (Thung Sukhla)
- City Pillar Shrine (Bang La

== Economy ==
Economic conditions within Laem Chabang city municipality largely depend on industry. Industrial factories operate more than 200 companies. They employ the largest number of workers in Chonburi province.

=== Laem Chabang Industrial Estate ===
It is one of the main development activities in Laem Chabang, located on an area of 569 ha (1,406 acres) between the harbor and Sukhumvit Road, Thung Sukhla subdistrict, divided into:

1. General industrial zone, 292 ha (721 acres) with approximately 80 companies, among which Mitsubishi car factory and engine factory, Fujitsu General (Thailand), Michelin Siam Company and Meyer Group Company.
2. Free business zone, 157 ha (387 acres) with approximately 26 companies in the first phase and 40 companies in the second phase.
3. Government and Public utility zone, 121 ha (298 acres) with branches of TOT Public Company, Eastern Investment Economic Center (BOI) and CAT Telecom Public Company Limited.

=== Saha Group Industrial Park ===
A private project established in 1977 located West of Motorway 7 at Nong Kham subdistrict, on an area of approximately 208 ha (514 acres), comprising about 80 industrial factories with at least 20,000 employees.

=== Laem Chabang Port ===
Port of Laem Chabang
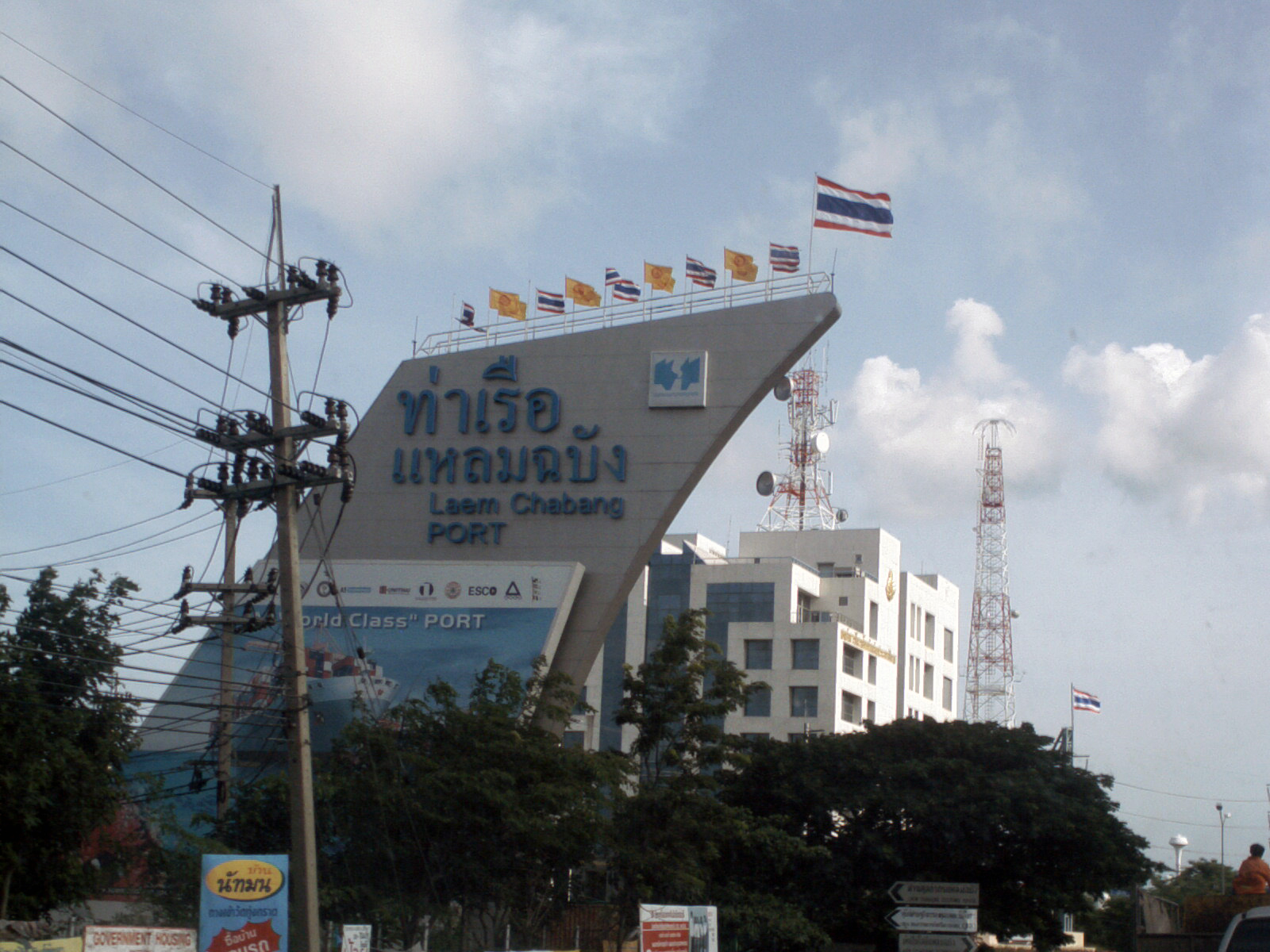
- Interactive map of Port of Laem Chabang

Location
- Country: Thailand
- Location: Laem Chabang, Chonburi Province

Details
- Owned by: Port Authority of Thailand
- Type of Harbor: Natural/Artificial
- Size of harbour: 21.06 km^{2} (8.1 sq.mi)
- Land area: 10.4 km^{2} (4 sq.mi)

Statistics
- Annual cargo tonnage: 80 million tonnes (FY2017)
- Annual container volume: 7.7 million TEUs (FY2017)
- Website laemchabangport.com

Thailand's largest port occupies 10.41 km^{2} (4 sq.mi) and is capable of handling the largest (Post-Panamax) vessels.
Development of the port complex started in 1988 to encourage development outside Bangkok and take advantage of proximity to the Gulf of Thailand. The container port was completed in 1991. In 2014 it handled 6.58 million TEUs, making it the 20th busiest container port in the world. In FY2017 (1 October 2016 – 30 September 2017) it handled 7.7 million TEUs. Much of the international shipping reaching Thailand passes through Laem Chabang. It is a port of call for Princess Cruises and Celebrity Cruises. It accommodated 59 passenger liners in FY2017.

Laem Chabang includes:

- Seven container terminals
- One multipurpose terminal
- One ro-ro terminal
- One passenger ro-ro terminal
- One general cargo terminal
- One shipyard terminal
- Adjacent Harbor Mall

The Port Authority of Thailand is responsible for the port overall. It engages private sector contractors to manage various port operations.

=== Petroleum Industry ===
Three oil refineries:

- Thai Oil Refineries Public Company Limited
- Esso (Thailand) Public Company Limited
- Thai Lube Base Oil Refineries Public Company Limited

Three petroleum oil depots:

- Thai Oil Public Company Limited
- Esso (Thailand) Public Company Limited
- PTT Public Company Limited

Three PPG depots:

- Thai Oil Public Company Limited
- Esso (Thailand) Public Company Limited
- PTT Public Company Limited

=== Transportation ===
Transportation is a continuous business from all this industry. There is a kaleidoscope of transport companies based in Laem Chabang, of which there are a few:

- CJ Logistics (Thailand) Co. Ltd.
- ESCO - Eastern Sea Laem Chabang Terminal Co. Ltd.
- Freight Links Express (Thailand) Co. Ltd.
- Logem Transport Co. Ltd.
- MON transport Co. Ltd.
- MSC Depot Laem Chabang.
- Shipco Transport (Thailand) Ltd.
- WICE Logistics Public Co. Ltd.

=== Agriculture ===
In the past there were a lot of pineapple plantations in the area of present-day Laem Chabang city municipality. Today agriculture has declined dramatically, mainly due to the growing industry.

=== Water management ===
- Laem Chabang Industrial Estate uses an average 23,000 m^{3}/day of tap water from Huai Nong Kho water reservoir in Nong Kham subdistrict.
- Waste water of 8,000 m^{3}/day produces
- 2,500 m^{3}/day of industrial water by means of reverse osmosis (RO) system.

== Education ==
There is one university: Kasetsart University Sriracha Campus
Three municipality schools:

- Laem Chabang school District 1
- Laem Chabang school District 2
- Laem Chabang school District 3

Twelve primary/secondary schools under the Chonburi Educational Service Area Office 3:

- Ban Bang Lamung school
- Ban Chak Yai Chin school
- Ban Thungkrad school
- Thai Kasikorn Songkhro Company school
- Thungsukla Phitthaya school
- Wat Ban Na school
- Wat Laem Chabang school
- Wat Mai Noen Phayom school
- Wat Manorom school
- Wat Nong Khla school
- Wat Phra Prathapon school
- Wat Sukree Bunyaram school

Four private schools:

- Boon Psychology school
- Laem Chabang Engineering school
- Laem Chabang Technology school
- Thanapon Wittaya school

There are also eight child development centers in Laem Chabang city municipality

== Health ==
A governmental and a private hospital in Laem Chabang.

- Laem Chabang Hospital (formerly Ao Udom Hospital) is a governmental hospital.
- Vibharam Laem Chabang Hospital (formerly Laem Chabang International Hospital) is a private hospital.

Three Public Health Service Centers:

- Public Health Service Center 1 (Nong Kham)
- Public Health Service Center 2 (Thung Krad)
- Public Health Service Center 3 (Khao Nam Sub)

Further about 24 private clinics.

== Sports ==
=== Golf ===
Laem Chabang has a world class golf course, the Laem Chabang International Country Club designed by Jack Nicklaus. This golf course in Bueng subdistrict consists of 27 holes on 283 ha (700 acres). "Mountain 9" is 3,151 m (3,446 yards) in length. "Lake 9" is 3,126 m (3,419 yards) in length.

=== Football ===
Laem Chabang municipal Stadium is currently used mostly for football matches and holds 2,000 people. In 2017 it was announced that the track would be surfaced to enable the hosting of major athletics events.
Laem Chabang City FC plays in Thai Lower Division with average of 250 spectators.

== Communities ==
Laem Chabang city municipality has 23 communities (chumchon), although not directly chosen by the local citizens, which provides advice and recommendations to local administrative organisations. They also promote and support community participation and enterprises at the district level and subdistrict villages.

Community name	Location	Village
Ban Ao Udom Community	Thung Sukhla	Moo1
Ban Thung Community	Thung Sukhla	Moo2
Ban Laem Chabang Com.	Thung Sukhla	Moo3
Ban Na Kao Community	Thung Sukhla	Moo4 + 5
Ban Khao Nam Sub Com.	Thung Sukhla	Moo6
Ao Udom Market Com.	Thung Sukhla	Moo7
Ban Chak Yai Chin Com.	Thung Sukhla	Moo8
Wat Manorom Community	Thung Sukhla	Moo9
Ban Laem Thong Com.	Thung Sukhla	Moo10
Ban Hai Lek Community	Thung Sukhla	Moo11 + 12
Wat Phra Praphon Com.	Surasak	Moo3 + 9

Community name	Location	Village
Ban Chak Pook Com.	Nong Kham	Moo11
Ban Nong Kham Com.	Nong Kham	Moo11
Ban Chak Kranej Com.	Bueng	Moo1
Ban Rai Nueng Com.	Bueng	Moo5
Ban Nong Khla Mai Com.	Bueng	Moo9
Ban Sethi Nai Fan Com.	Bueng	Moo9 + 10
Ban Nong Khla Kao Com.	Bueng	Moo10
Ban Nong Manao Com.	Bang Lamung	Moo4
Ban Na Mai Com.	Bang Lamung	Moo6
Ban Nong Phang Phuai Com.	Bang Lamung	Moo7
Ban Thung Krad Com.	Bang Lamung	Moo8
Ban Bang Lamung Com.	Bang Lamung	Moo9
