= China Airlines =

National airline of the Republic of China (Taiwan)

China Airlines 中華航空

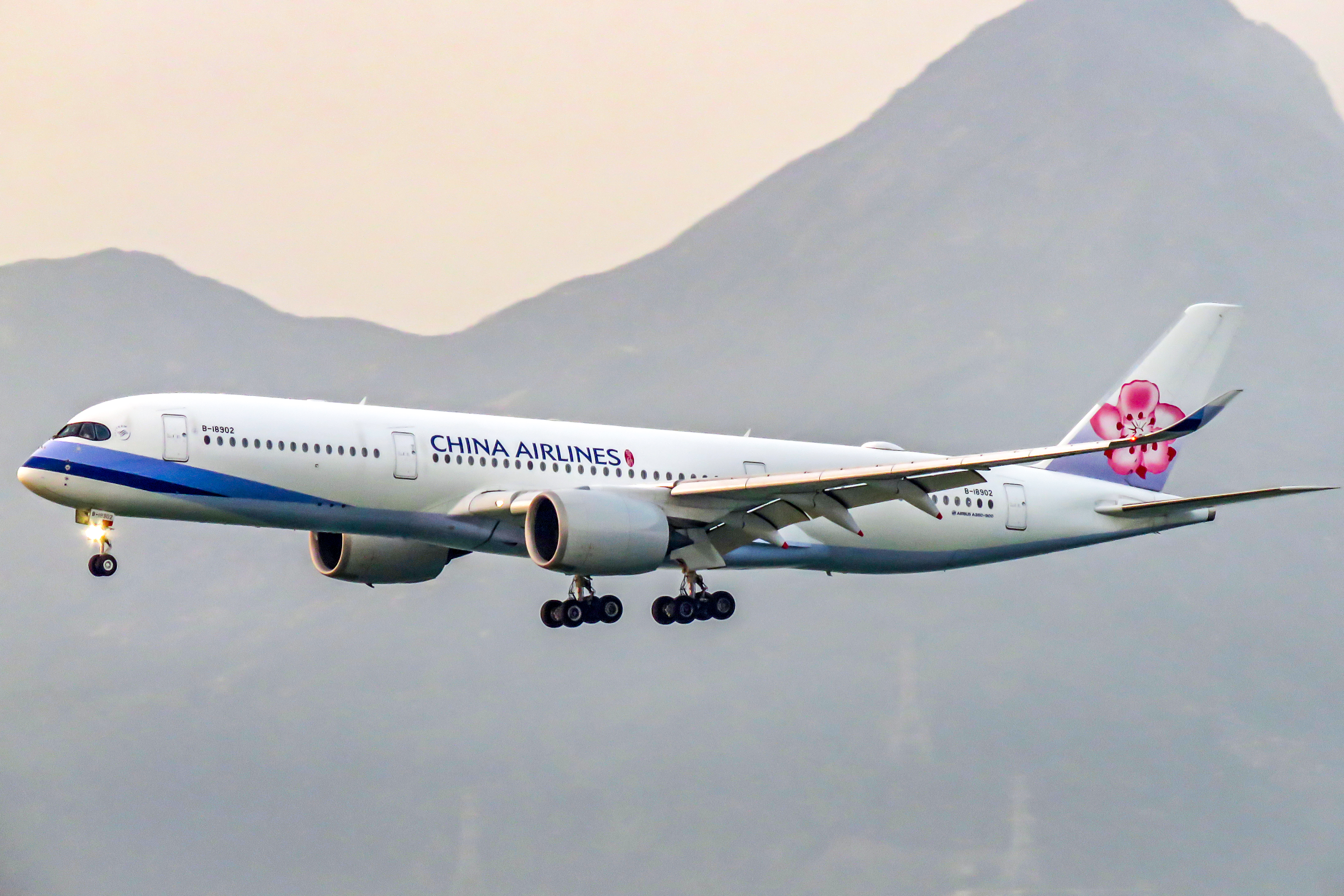
- China Airlines Airbus A350-900
IATA	ICAO	Call sign
CI	CAL	DYNASTY
- Founded: September 7, 1959; 67 years ago
- Commenced operations: December 16, 1959; 66 years ago
- Hubs: Taipei–Taoyuan
- Focus cities: Kaohsiung; Taipei–Songshan
- Frequent-flyer program: Dynasty Flyer
- Alliance: SkyTeam
- Subsidiaries: China Airlines Cargo; Mandarin Airlines; Tigerair Taiwan
- Fleet size: 85
- Destinations: 102
- Parent company: China Airlines Group
- ISIN: TW0002610003
- Headquarters: CAL Park, Dayuan District, Taoyuan City, Taiwan
- Key people: Kao Shing-Hwang (Chairman); Chen Han-Ming (President)
- Revenue: ▲TWD 139.815 billion (2017)
- Operating income: ▲TWD 3.088 billion (2017)
- Net income: ▲TWD 2.208 billion (2017)
- Total assets: ▲TWD 228.421 billion (2017)
- Total equity: ▲TWD 54.709 billion (2017)
- Employees: 11,400
- Website: www.china-airlines.com

China Airlines
- Traditional Chinese: 中華航空
- Simplified Chinese: 中华航空
Transcriptions
Standard Mandarin
- Hanyu Pinyin: Zhōnghuá Hángkōng
- Bopomofo: ㄓㄨㄥ ㄏㄨㄚˊ ㄏㄤˊ ㄎㄨㄥ
- Wade–Giles: Chung^{1}-hua^{2} Hang^{2}-k'ung^{1}
- IPA: [ʈʂʊ́ŋ.xwǎ xǎŋ.kʰʊ́ŋ]
Yue: Cantonese
- Jyutping: zung1 waa4 hong4 hung1
Southern Min
- Hokkien POJ: Tiong-hôa Hâng-khong

Abbreviation
- Traditional Chinese: 華航
- Simplified Chinese: 华航
Transcriptions
Standard Mandarin
- Hanyu Pinyin: Huáháng
- Bopomofo: ㄏㄨㄚˊ ㄏㄤˊ
- Wade–Giles: Hua^{2}-hang^{2}
- IPA: [xwǎ.xǎŋ]
Yue: Cantonese
- Jyutping: waa4 hong4
Southern Min
- Hokkien POJ: Hôa-hâng

China Airlines (CAL; Chinese: 中華航空; pinyin: Zhōnghuá Hángkōng; Pe̍h-ōe-jī: Tiong-hôa Hâng-khong) is the state-owned flag carrier of the Republic of China (Taiwan). It is one of Taiwan's three major airlines, along with EVA Air and Starlux Airlines. It is headquartered in Taoyuan International Airport and operates over 1,400 flights weekly – including 91 pure cargo flights – to 102 cities across Asia, Europe, North America, and Oceania. Carrying nearly 20 million passengers and 5700 tons of cargo in 2017, the carrier was the 33rd largest airline in the world in terms of revenue passenger kilometers and 10th largest in terms of freight revenue ton kilometers.

China Airlines is owned by the China Airlines Group, which is headquartered at CAL Park and also operates China Airlines Cargo, a member of SkyTeam Cargo, which operates a fleet of freighter aircraft and manages its parent airline's cargo-hold capacity. Its sister airlines include Mandarin Airlines, which operates flights to domestic and low-demand regional destinations, and Tigerair Taiwan, which is a low-cost carrier established by China Airlines and Singaporean airline group Tigerair Holdings but is now wholly owned by the China Airlines Group.

== History ==
=== Formation and early years (1959–1970) ===
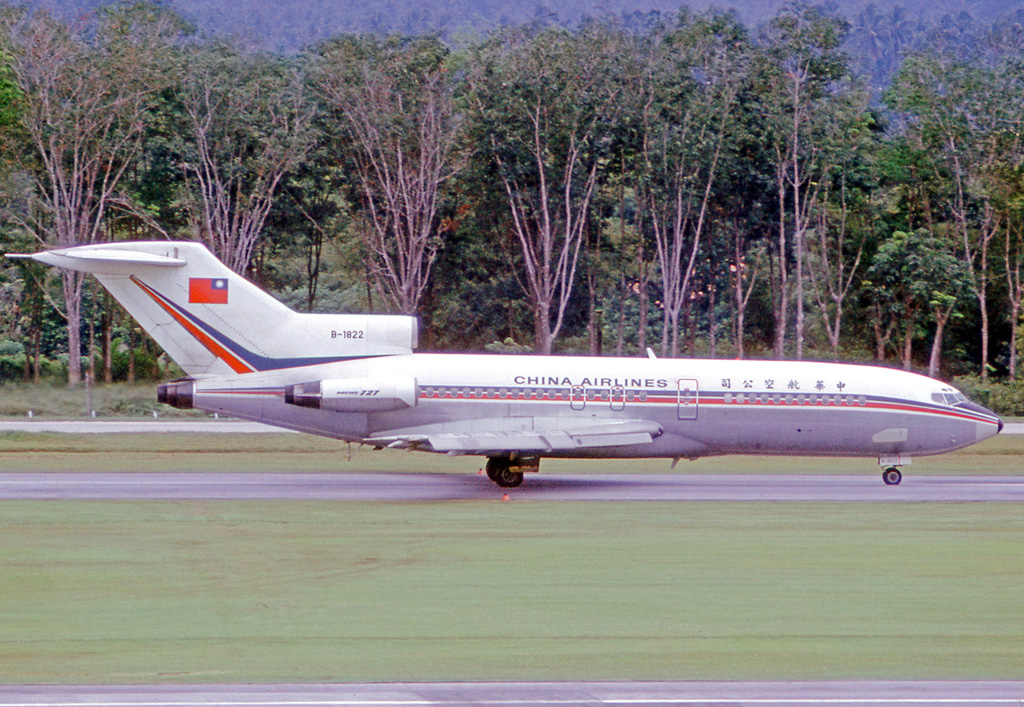
China Airlines Boeing 727-09C at Singapore International Airport in 1974

Taiwan's airlines can trace its origins to Japan Air Transport and later, Imperial Japanese Airways, which served Taiwan during colonial rule by Japan. These airlines served the cities of Taihoku, Taichu, Tainan, and Takao.

With a fleet of two PBY Amphibians, China Airlines was established on December 16, 1959, with its shares completely held by the Republic of China government. It was founded by I Fuen, a retired ROC Air Force officer, and initially concentrated on charter flights. The roots of this airline can be traced to 1929 when the Nationalist government formed China National Aviation Corporation that served as a major airline of the country until the Chinese Communist Party took over Mainland China and nationalized its operations in 1949 which then absorbed the CNAC into the People's Aviation Company of China in 1952.

During the 1960s, China Airlines was able to establish its first scheduled routes. In October 1962, a flight from Taipei to Hualien became the airline's first domestic service. With the airline's Boeing 707 aircraft, trans-Pacific flights to San Francisco via Tokyo were initiated on February 2, 1970.

=== International expansion (1970–1995) ===
Following the standard utilization of the wide-body 747 on the highly profitable Trans-Pacific – United States routes, China Airlines introduced its first two 747-100s (ex-Delta Air Lines aircraft) in 1976 and immediately placed them on its Hong Kong-Taipei-Tokyo-Honolulu-Los Angeles route. Shortly thereafter, four brand new Boeing 747SPs (Special Performance) were introduced in 1977.

In April 1974, Japan signed an aviation agreement with the People's Republic of China, which mandated that CAL and CAAC aircraft not be allowed at Japanese airports at the same time. The ROC government responded by suspending all air service between Taiwan and Japan. In October 1975, China Airlines resumed service to Tokyo Haneda as a stopover on its transpacific route to the US. CAL remained at Haneda when other international carriers moved to Narita in May 1978. Japan's restrictions were eventually eased in the 2000s, allowing CAL to move from Haneda to Narita in April 2002, and begin service to Kansai in 2006.

The next 20 years saw sporadic but far-reaching growth for the company. The 747SP, introduced in 1977, made it possible for China Airlines to fly daily nonstop services from Taipei to its North American destinations without stopping over in Japan, and to introduce flights to Saudi Arabia and South Africa. In 1979, the airline switched all operations from the smaller Taipei Songshan Airport to the newly built Chiang Kai-Shek International Airport (now Taoyuan International Airport). Following the introduction of 747-200s, the airline introduced its first European destination, Amsterdam. In the late 1980s, the airline operated round-the-world service with a routing of Taipei-Anchorage-New York-Amsterdam-Dhahran-Bangkok-Taipei.

On February 8, 1990, China Airlines received the first of its initial five Boeing 747-400s (B-161). 1993 saw the airline listed on the Taiwan Stock Exchange. The new 747-400s and an earlier order with Airbus for over a dozen A300B4 and A300-600Rs wide body regional jets allowed for addition destination growth. During the 1990s, China Airlines also bought the McDonnell Douglas MD-11 and had to compete with a new competitor, EVA Air. They also founded another airline to deal with the PRC-ROC dispute which borrowed aircraft from China Airlines itself. One of China Airlines's 747-400s (B-164) was also used by President Lee Tung-hui during his trip to the United States in June 1995.

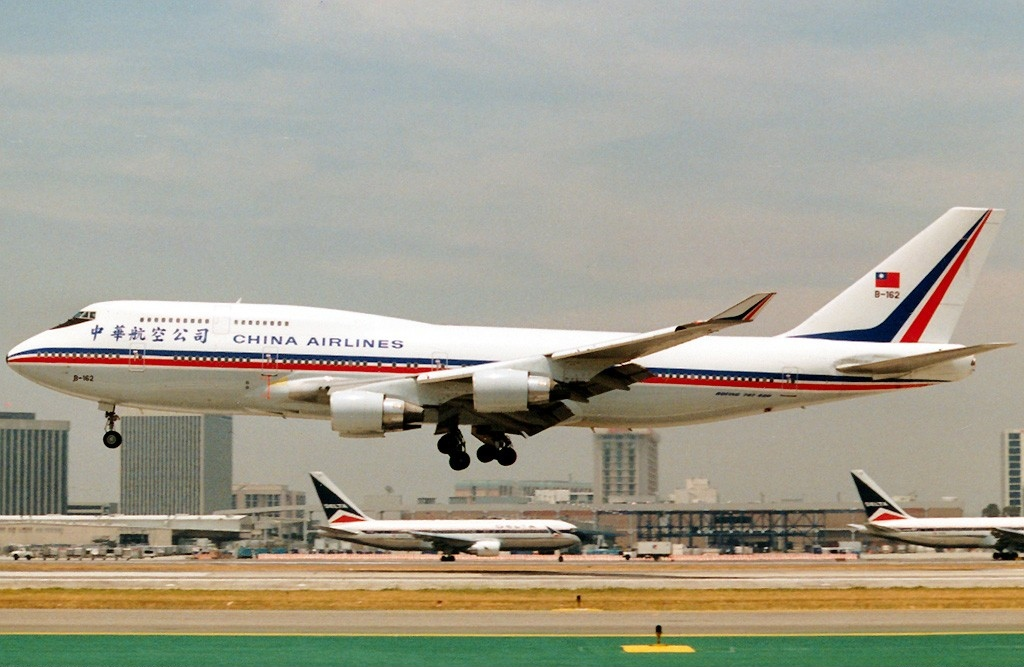
China Airlines Boeing 747-400 at Los Angeles International Airport (B-162). Second 747-400 bought by China Airlines on the Taipei to Los Angeles route in the old pre-1995 livery.

=== Change of logo and livery (1995–2010) ===
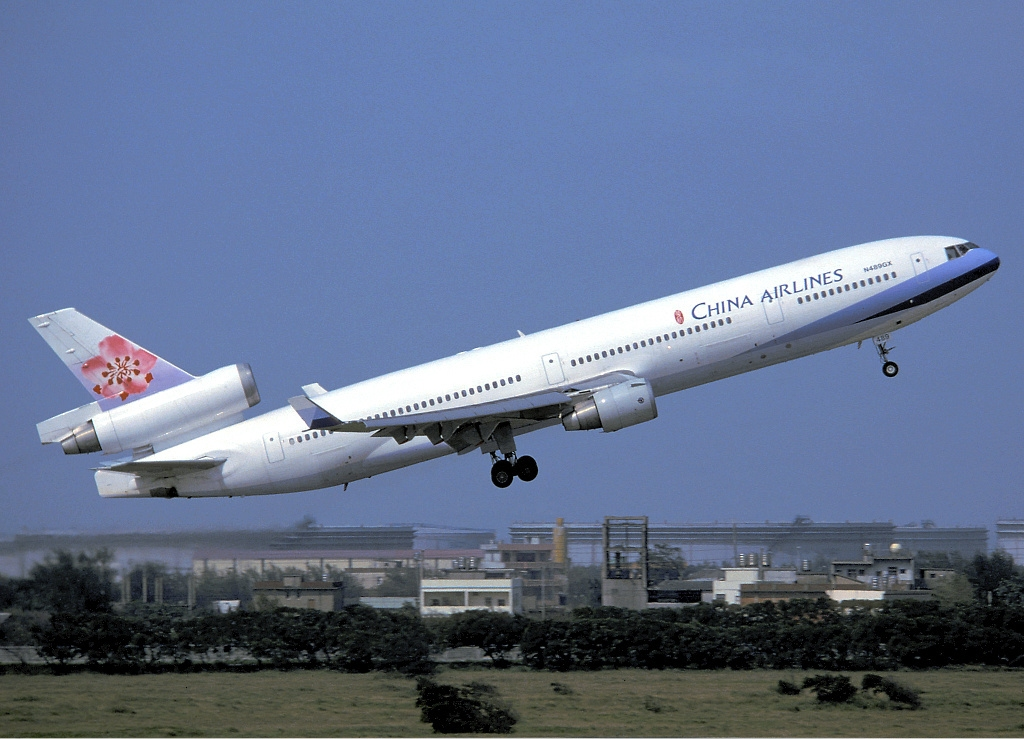
An MD-11 wearing the new China Airlines pink flower livery at Taipei Chiang Kai-Shek (now Taoyuan) International Airport in 2001

As the Republic of China (Taiwan)'s flag carrier, China Airlines has been affected by disputes over the political status of Republic of China (Taiwan), is under pressure from the Chinese Communist Party, and was barred from flying into a number of countries maintaining diplomatic relations with the People's Republic of China ("Mainland China"). As a result, in the mid-1990s, China Airlines subsidiary Mandarin Airlines took over some of its Sydney and Vancouver international routes. Starting from October 7, 1995, partly as a way to avoid the international controversy, China Airlines unveiled its "plum blossom" logo, replacing the national flag which had previously appeared on the tail fins (empennage), and the aircraft livery from the red-white-blue national colours on the fuselage of its aircraft. The plum blossom (Prunus mume) is the Republic of China's National Flower.

Throughout the 1990s, the airline employed many ex-ROC Air Force pilots. Due to the company's poor safety record in the 1990s, China Airlines began to change its pilot recruitment practices and the company began to actively recruit civilian-trained pilots with proven track records. In addition, the company began recruiting university graduates as trainees in its own pilot training program. The company also modified its maintenance and operational procedures. These decisions were instrumental in the company's improved safety record, culminating in the company's recognition by the IATA Operational Safety Audit (IOSA).

During the 1990s and early 2000s, China Airlines placed orders for various airliners including the Airbus A330, Airbus A340, Boeing 737-800, as well as for additional 747-400s (both the passenger and freighter version).

China Airlines signed an agreement to begin the process of joining airline alliance SkyTeam on September 14, 2010 and officially became a full member on September 28, 2011. This was marked by an update to the logo of the airline and the typeface in which "China Airlines" is printed. The carrier was the first Taiwanese airline to join an airline alliance.

=== 2012–present ===
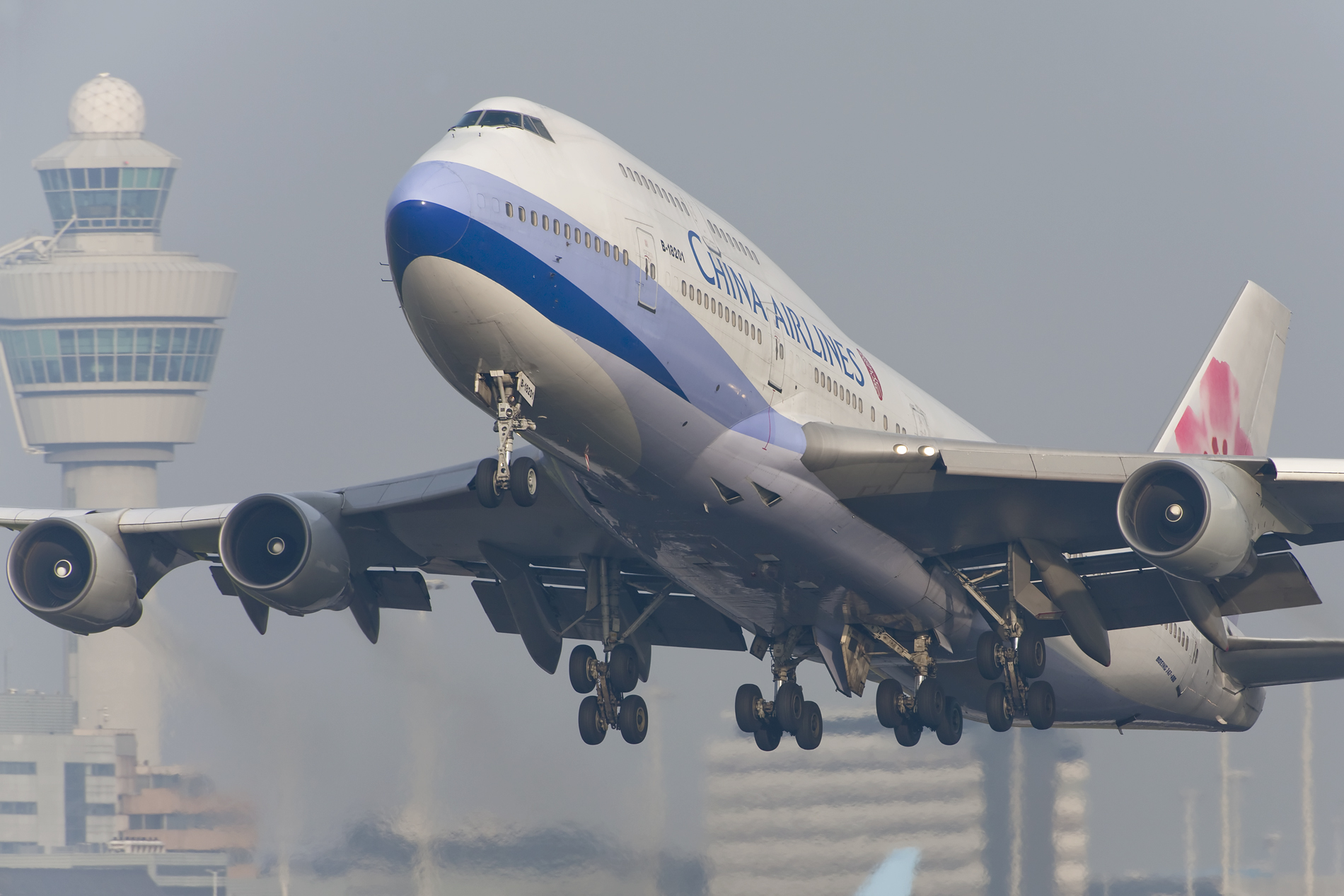
China Airlines Boeing 747-400 at Amsterdam Airport Schiphol in 2011

Since 2012, China Airlines has participated in the Pacific Greenhouse Gases Measurement (PGGM) Project, led by the Environmental Protection Administration, Ministry of Science and Technology, and National Central University. As part of the collaboration, China Airlines installed "In-service Aircraft for a Global Observing System (IAGOS)" on three aircraft: B-18806 (Airbus A340-300) in June 2012, B-18317 (Airbus A330-300) in July 2016, and B-18316 (Airbus A330-300) in July 2017. B-18806 also wore "The Official Airline for Climate Monitoring" special livery. Between July 2012 and September 2017, the PGGM fleet collected greenhouse gases-data from a total of 4682 flights. In May 2017, B-18806 was retired. B-18316 and B-18317 are expected to continue collecting data until 2027.

In December 2013, China Airlines announced its new joint venture with Singaporean low-cost carrier Tigerair Holdings (now defunct and replaced by Budget Aviation Holdings) to establish Tigerair Taiwan. The new airline flew its inaugural flight to Singapore on September 26, 2014, and became the first, and currently only, Taiwanese low-cost carrier. Tigerair Holdings previously held 10 percent of the shares. As disputes unfolded surrounding the partnership, China Airlines Group re-negotiated with Tigerair Holdings and has now taken full ownership of Tigerair Taiwan.

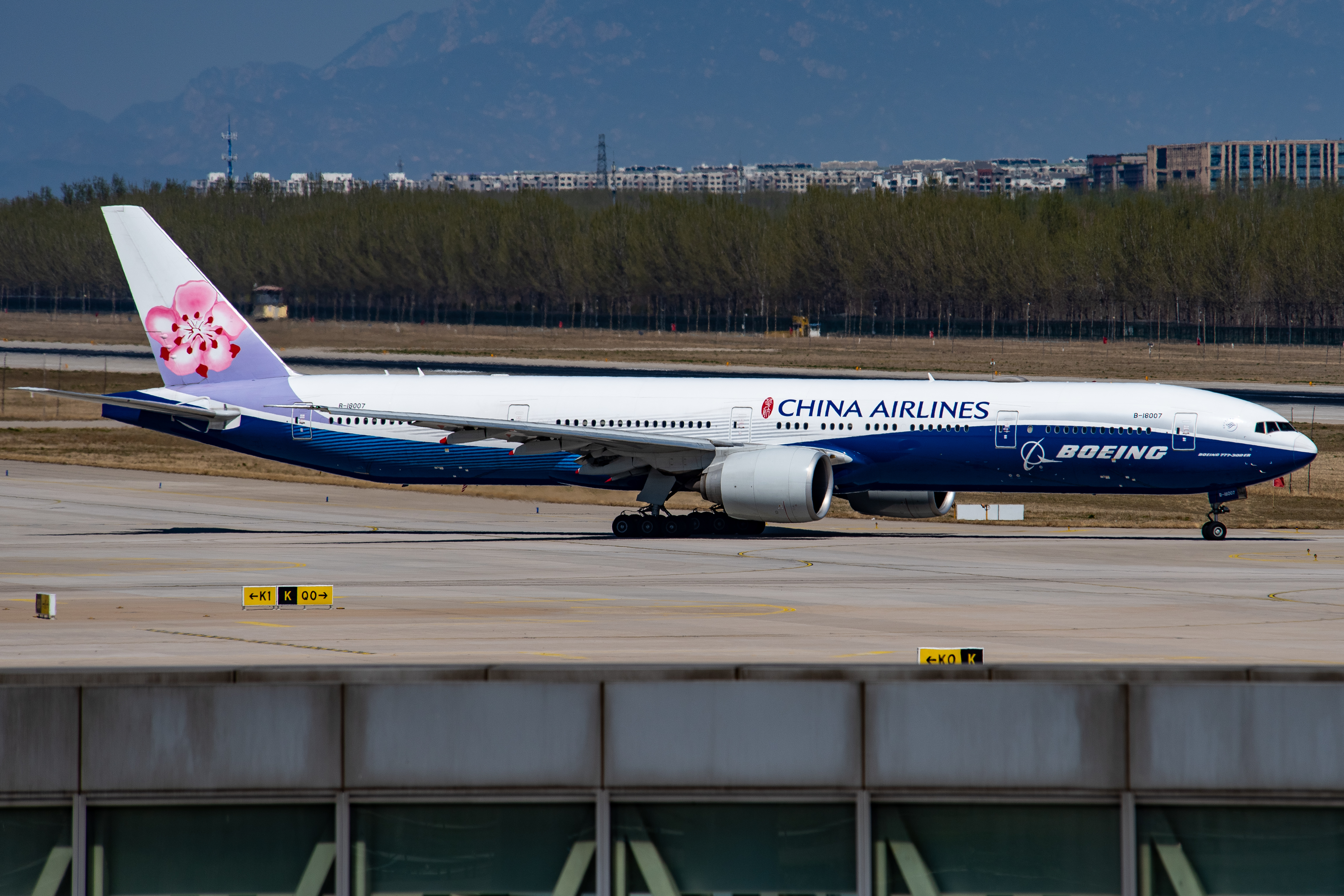
China Airlines Boeing 777-300ER co-branded with Boeing Dreamliner colors

In March 2014, China Airlines announced the "NexGen (Next Generation)" plan to complement its then-upcoming Boeing 777-300ER and Airbus A350-900 XWB. Designed to refresh the brand image of the carrier, the plan included product innovations, new uniforms, and fleet replacements. Through cooperating with designers from the Greater China region, the carrier hoped to introduce unique product offerings that could showcase the beauty of the Orient and the cultural creativity of Taiwan. The first phase of the plan has been completed. In addition to new cabin designs, also introduced were the renovated Dynasty Lounges at Taiwan Taoyuan International Airport and the debut of new William Chang-designed uniforms. The new fleet types allowed the retirement of older aircraft; the A340-300 fleet was fully retired in June 2017, while the 747-400 has been fully replaced on long-haul routes. With the First Class-equipped 747s flying regionally and new long-haul aircraft not featuring First Class, China Airlines terminated First Class services in 2016. First Class seats are now sold as Business Class.

Future phases of the NexGen plan include ordering new aircraft to replace older fleet types. In May 2019, the airline announced that it will be introducing the Airbus A321neo, including 14 leased, 11 purchased, and five options, along with three orders and three options for the Boeing 777F. The A321neo will replace the Boeing 737-800 while the 777F will replace the Boeing 747-400F. Cabin design on the A321neo will continue the NexGen design ethos to provide passenger experience cohesive with that of the 777 and A350.

Focus has also been put on tapping the maintenance, repair and overhaul (MRO) market. In January 2015, China Airlines established Taiwan Aircraft Maintenance & Engineering Co. (TAMECO), an airline MRO company focusing on Boeing 737 and 777, and Airbus A320, A330, A340, and A350 XWB families' fuselage maintenance. For the project, Airbus is providing a wide range of support, one of which is inviting China Airlines to join the Airbus MRO Alliance (AMA), alongside AAR Corp, Aeroman, Sabena technics, Etihad Airways Engineering, and GAMECO. Moreover, a joint-venture agreement has been signed with Tulsa-based Nordam, specializing in nacelle, thrust reversers, and composite materials, to establish the only Nordam repair center in Asia. The first TAMECO hangar, to be completed in March 2019, will be able to accommodate 2 777/A350 and 3 737/A320 sized aircraft at the same time.

Labor-management unrest has been a major issue at China Airlines over recent years. On June 25, 2016, the Taoyuan Flight Attendants Union, representing some 2,500 cabin crew, staged the first strike in Taiwanese aviation history. A total of 122 passenger flights were cancelled during the day-long strike. During the 2019 Lunar New Year season, over 600 pilots participated in a seven-day strike by the Taoyuan Union of Pilots. Over 200 flights were cancelled between February 8 and 14.

In July 2020, the DPP-led Legislative Yuan passed a resolution for the Ministry of Transportation and Communications to rename the airline and redesign its liveries due to frequent confusion with Air China. The name change plans were on hold since 2022.

== Headquarters ==
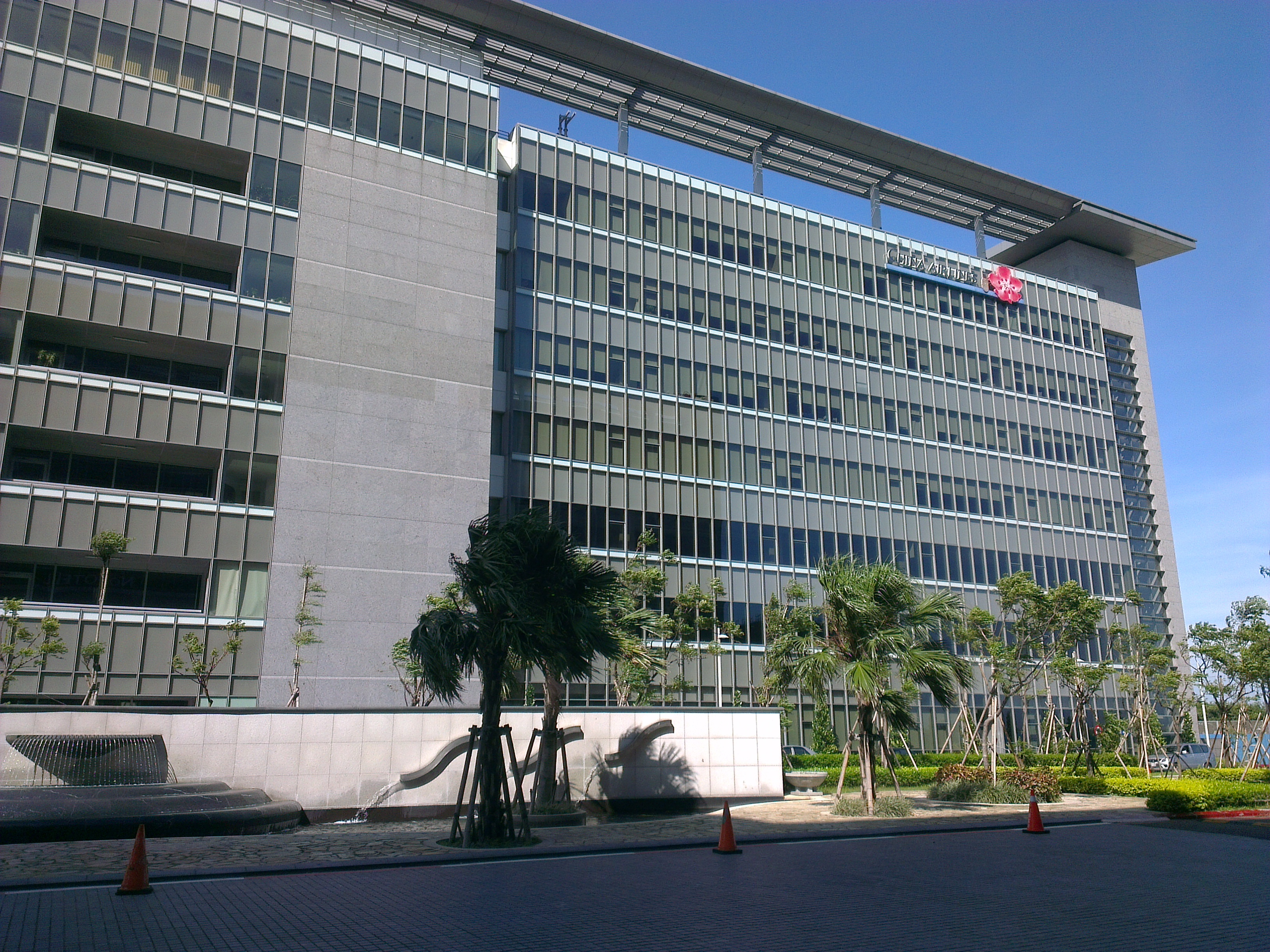
CAL Park, the company's headquarters

China Airlines has its headquarters, CAL Park (Chinese: 華航園區; pinyin: Huáháng Yuánqū), on the grounds of Taiwan Taoyuan International Airport in Dayuan District (formerly Dayuan Township), Taoyuan City (formerly Taoyuan County). CAL Park, located at the airport entrance, forms a straight line with Terminal 1, Terminal 2, and the future Terminal 3.

Previously China Airlines had its headquarters and facilities on the east side of Taipei Songshan Airport, in the China Airlines Building on Nanjing E. Road, and at Taiwan Taoyuan International Airport. The functions were consolidated following the completion of CAL Park. The Taipei Branch Office of the airline remains at the China Airlines Building in downtown Taipei.

== Branding ==
=== Livery and uniforms ===
Prior to introducing the current plum blossom livery in 1995, the livery of China Airlines featured the flag of Republic of China (Taiwan) on the tail due to commercial and political reasons. The common practice after the move to Taiwan in 1949 was for related enterprises to have the Taiwanese flag. In the 1990s, the airline management stated to the South China Morning Post that the logo change to the flower was not because of politics. Han Cheung of the Taipei Times wrote that "the change was reportedly made so that the airline could keep flying to Hong Kong after the 1997 handover to China."

In 2011, the carrier made alterations to its logo as part of refreshing the brand image which were unveiled during the SkyTeam joining ceremony on September 28. A new font was chosen for the company name and a new approach was taken for the appearance of the plum blossom trademark.

China Airlines has had many uniforms since its establishment in 1959. The current uniform was designed by Hong Kong-based costume designer William Chang and introduced in 2015 to celebrate the carrier entering a "NexGen" Next Generation Era.

=== Marketing slogans ===
China Airlines has used different slogans throughout its operational history. In 2006, the current slogan was introduced to complement the new uniforms and to celebrate its 47th anniversary. China Airlines' slogans have been as follows:

- We treasure every encounter (1987–1995)
- We blossom everyday (1995–2006)
- Journey with a caring smile (2006)
- Expect The Coming Greatness (approximately 2016), a slogan featured on marketing material distributed at the San Francisco Orchid Society's Pacific Orchid Expedition, of which China Airlines was a sponsor. The marketing material also referenced "China Airlines presents newly retrofitted Boeing 747-400."

=== Name issues ===
The name China Airlines reflects Taiwan's official name, the Republic of China. This became an issue during the COVID-19 pandemic when foreign officials and the international press mistakenly identified a number of China Airlines flights repatriating Taiwanese citizens or bringing medical supplies to afflicted countries as related to the People's Republic of China rather than the Republic of China. In April 2020, Premier Su Tseng-chang voiced support for changing the name but said that it might come at the cost of the nation's aviation rights. The Premier announced that China Airlines would highlight Taiwan on the fuselage of planes delivering COVID-19 related medical supplies.

=== Special liveries ===
The first China Airlines special livery, the "Taiwan Touch Your Heart" tourism-promotional livery, was introduced in 2003. The project was a collaboration between the carrier and the Tourism Bureau of Taiwan. However, the plane was painted back to the normal livery before it left the hangar. Currently, China Airlines has a total of 5 special livery aircraft in service.

Planes currently carrying hybrid liveries:

- B-18007 (Boeing 777-300ER) – World's first co-branded Boeing 777 (a variation of the Blue Whale theme previously worn by B-18210 (Boeing 747-400)
- B-18918 (Airbus A350-900) – First aircraft in the world to use an Airbus co-branded livery

Plane once carrying a hybrid livery:

- B-18210 (Boeing 747-400) – Nicknamed 'Blue Whale'; first aircraft in the world to use Boeing's co-branded livery on the 747-400

==== Skyteam alliance livery ====
China Airlines has two aircraft painted in the SkyTeam alliance livery:

- B-18311 (Airbus A330-300) – Previously wore the "Sweet Fruit" livery

Plane once part of the series:

- B-18206 (Boeing 747-400) – First Boeing 747 to wear the SkyTeam livery
- B-18211 (Boeing 747-400)

==== Pokémon Jet ====
China Airlines unveiled the first Pokémon Jet in Taiwan as a part of "Pokémon Air Adventures", a collaboration project with The Pokémon Company. The aircraft is a Airbus A321neo dubbed "Pikachu Jet CI", in which Pikachu (a popular Pokémon representing the franchise) is prominently featured. The jet will have Pokémon themed check in tickets, in-flight items, and merchandise.

Planes currently part of the series:

- B-18101 (Airbus A321neo) – "Pikachu Jet CI1", featuring Pikachu (main character), Shaymin, Swablu, Togekiss, Munna, Jigglypuff, Snorlax, Slowpoke and Teddiursa
- B-18916 (Airbus A350-900) – "Pikachu Jet CI2", featuring Pikachu (main character), and 13 Pokemon Characters

==== "Flying Ambassador of Taiwan” series ====
In 2016, China Airlines announced that the Airbus A350-900 fleet will have a naming theme that combines endemic birds and unique features of Taiwan. The first two A350s were named Mikado pheasant and Taiwan blue magpie by the airline. The names of the remaining 12 aircraft were selected by the Taiwanese public online from a total of 24 choices.

Planes once part of the series:

- B-18901 (Airbus A350-900) – Named and decorated after Mikado pheasant. Repainted into standard China Airlines livery in July 2022.
- B-18908 (Airbus A350-900) – Named and decorated after Taiwan blue magpie. Repainted into standard China Airlines livery in May 2023.

===== 50th Anniversary series =====
In 2009, China Airlines decorated one plane of each of its plane types with the "50th Anniversary" logo. All planes of the series now wear the regular corporate livery or another special livery.

Planes once part of this series:

- B-18208 (Boeing 747-400)
- B-18312 (Airbus A330-300)
- B-18606 (Boeing 737-800)
- B-18725 (Boeing 747-400F)
- B-18806 (Airbus A340-300) – Later wore the "Official Airline for Climate Monitoring" livery until its retirement

===== Taiwanese culture and creativity series =====
In 2013, China Airlines revealed plans to start a series of Taiwan-themed special livery aircraft. The carrier collaborated with Taiwanese artists, cultural workers, and the Tourism Bureau to design the special liveries.

Planes once part of this series:

- B-18203 (Boeing 747-400) – "Love & Hug" livery, in collaboration with illustrator Jimmy Liao
- B-18358 (Airbus A330-300) – "Masalu! Taiwan" livery, in collaboration with Paiwan artist Sakuliu Pavavaljung and the Council of Indigenous Peoples
- B-18361 (Airbus A330-300) – "Cloud Gate Dance Theater" livery, in collaboration with Cloud Gate Dance Theater

===== 60th Anniversary series =====
In 2019, China Airlines entered its sixtieth year of operations. As part of the celebrations, the airline announced plans to decorate one aircraft from each of its fleet type with special 60th Anniversary stickers. The logo consisted of the number "60" in China Airlines' corporate colors, blue and red. The design also resembled "GO" and the infinity symbol "∞". All planes of the series now wear the regular corporate livery.

Planes once part of this series:

- B-18917 (Airbus A350-900)
- B-18701 (Boeing 747-400F)
- B-18006 (Boeing 777-300ER)
- B-18317 (Airbus A330-300)
- B-18659 (Boeing 737-800) – Previously painted in "Taichung" livery
- B-18210 (Boeing 747-400) – Previously painted in Boeing co-branded livery

===== Zootopia 2 Jet =====
China Airlines unveiled a Zootopia 2-themed Boeing 777-300ER in November 2025, debuting on a Taipei to Los Angeles run on November 19. Other regular destinations for this livery include Ontario (CA), Tokyo-Narita, Osaka, Shanghai, and Bangkok.

Judy Hopps, Nick Wilde, Gary de'Snake, Nibbles Maplestick, and Flash Slothmore are featured, as well as the original Zootopia being featured on China Airlines's IFE system in addition to Zootopia-themed in-flight items and merchandise onboard.

The aircraft has now been reverted back to its origional China Airlines corporate livery.

Planes once part of the series:

- B-18055 (Boeing 777-300ER) – Featuring Judy Hopps, Nick Wilde, Gary de'Snake, Nibbles Maplestick, and Flash Slothmore.

===== Other retired special liveries =====
- B-18209 (Boeing 747-400) – "Taiwan Touch Your Heart" livery, in collaboration with the Tourism Bureau
- B-18305 (Airbus A330-300) – "Butterfly Orchid" livery, in collaboration with the Council of Agriculture
- B-18311 (Airbus A330-300) – "Sweet Fruit" livery, in collaboration with the Council of Agriculture; currently wearing SkyTeam livery
- B-18355 (Airbus A330-300) – "Welcome to Taiwan" livery, in collaboration with the Tourism Bureau
- B-18610 (Boeing 737-800) – "Lavender" livery, commemorating launch of Sapporo flights
- B-18806 (Airbus A340-300) – "The Official Airline for Climate Monitoring" livery for the Pacific Greenhouse Gases Measurement (PGGM) Project; previously painted in "50th Anniversary" livery
- B-18659 (Boeing 737-800) – "Taichung" livery, in collaboration with Taichung World Flora Exposition; leased to its subsidiary Mandarin Airlines until 2019; currently wearing "60th Anniversary" livery
- B-18657 (Boeing 737-800) – "Buddy Bears" livery, in collaboration with Tourism Bureau, Kaohsiung City Government and Kumamoto Prefecture; featuring Taiwanese and Japanese cartoon bears OhBear (Taiwan), Hero (Kaohsiung) and Kumamon (Kumamoto) along with famous landmarks from Kaohsiung and Kumamoto

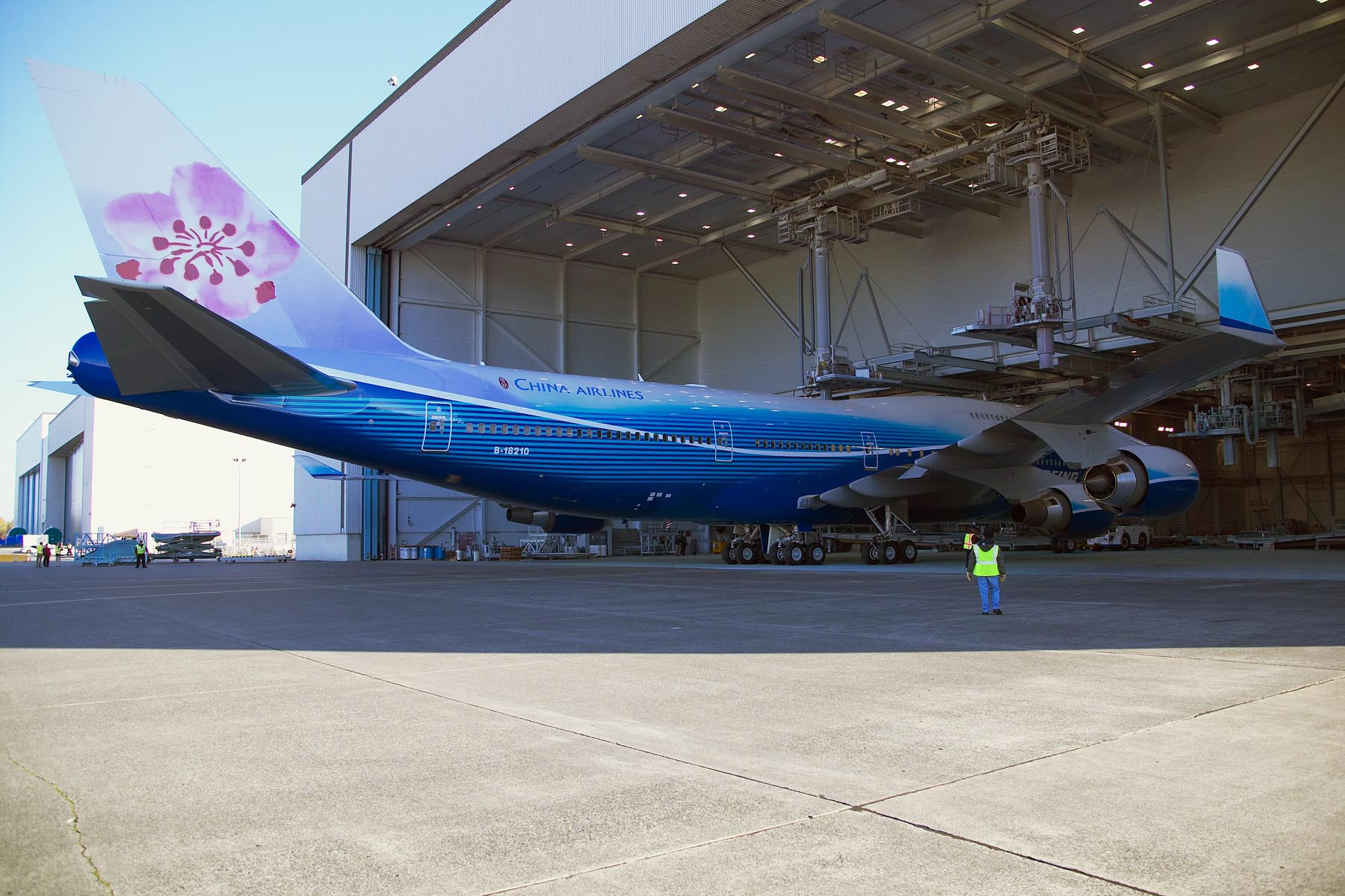
"Blue Whale" 747 in the hangars

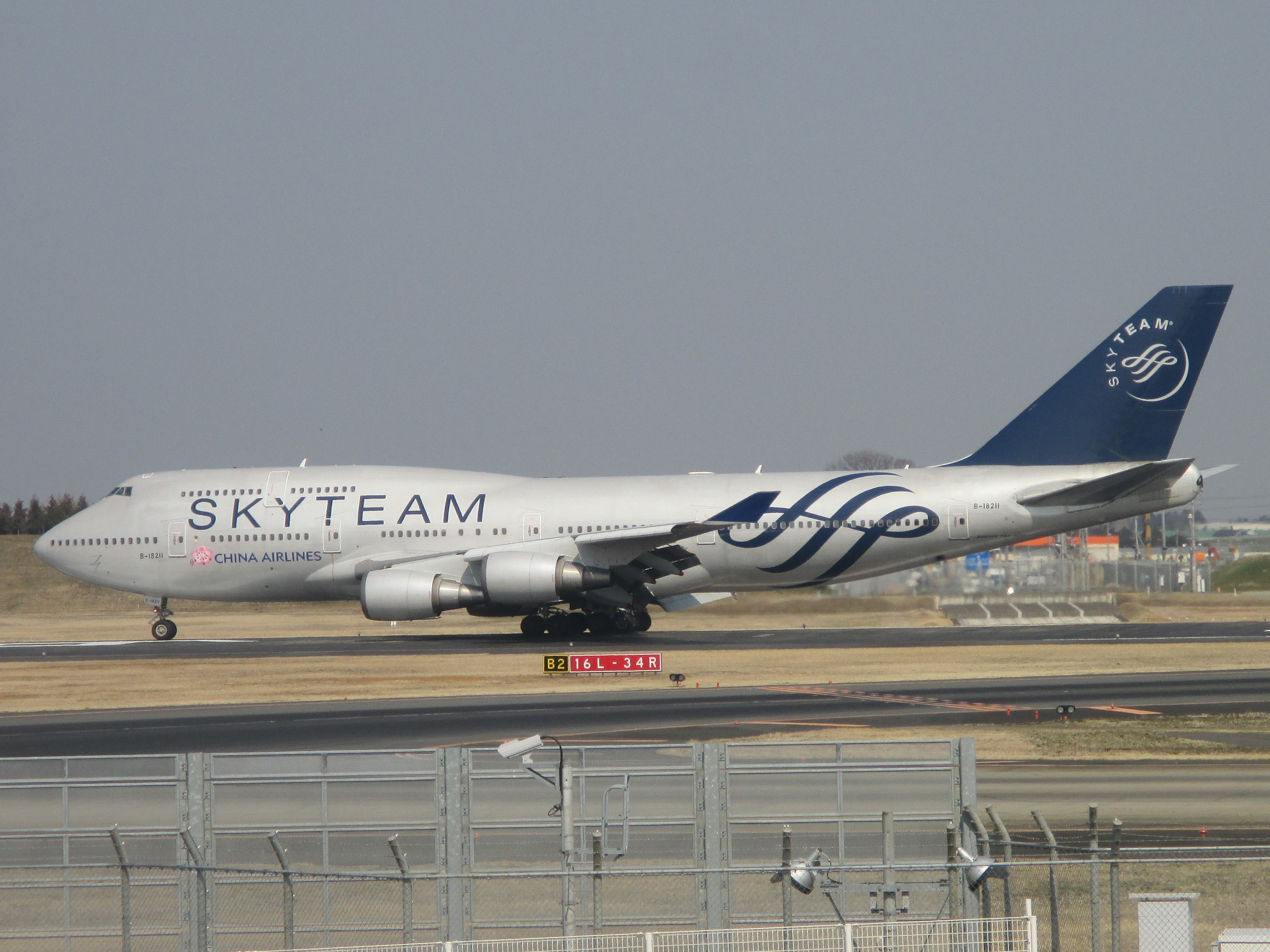
SkyTeam 747-400

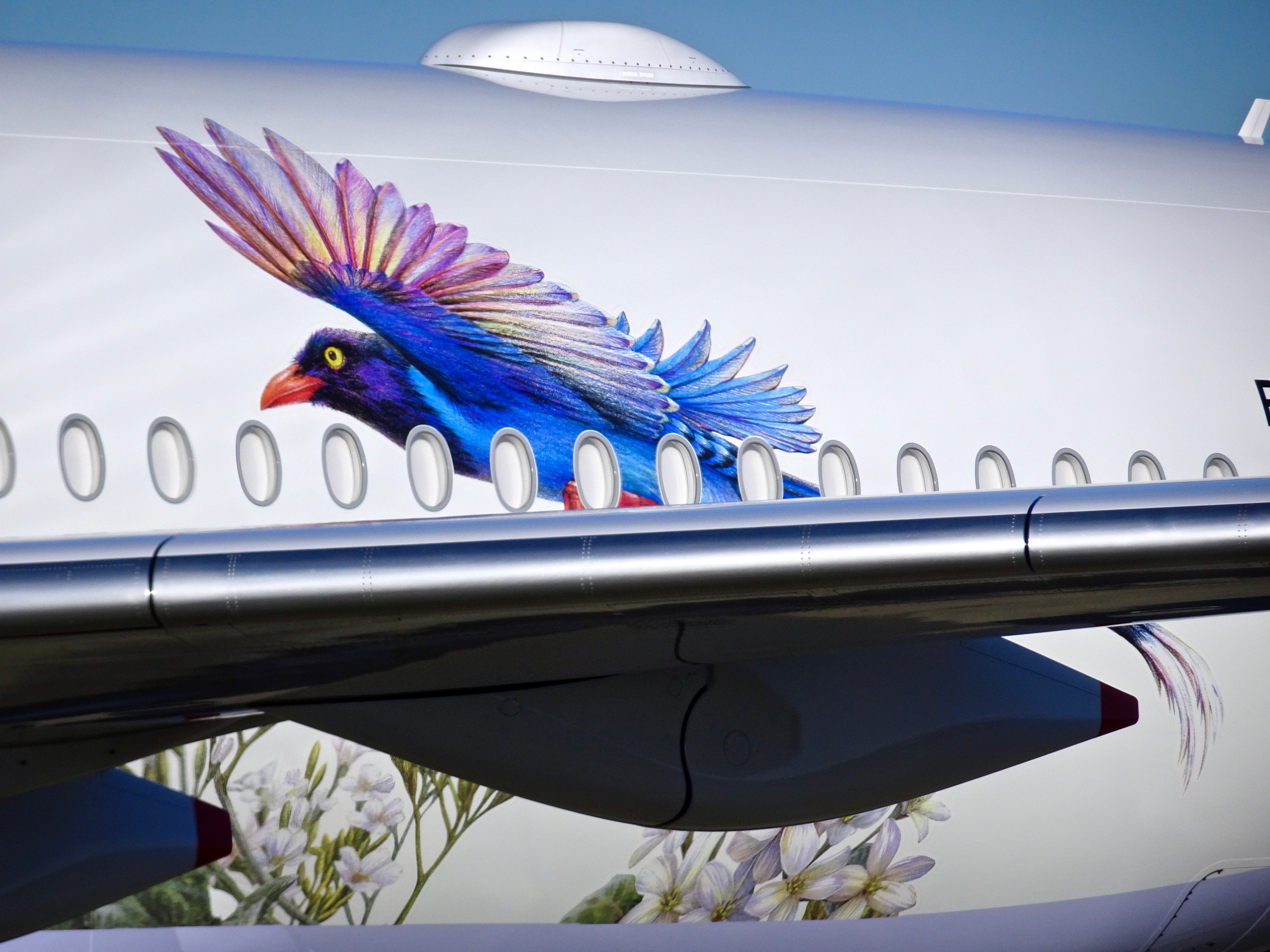
"Taiwan Blue Magpie" A350 close-up

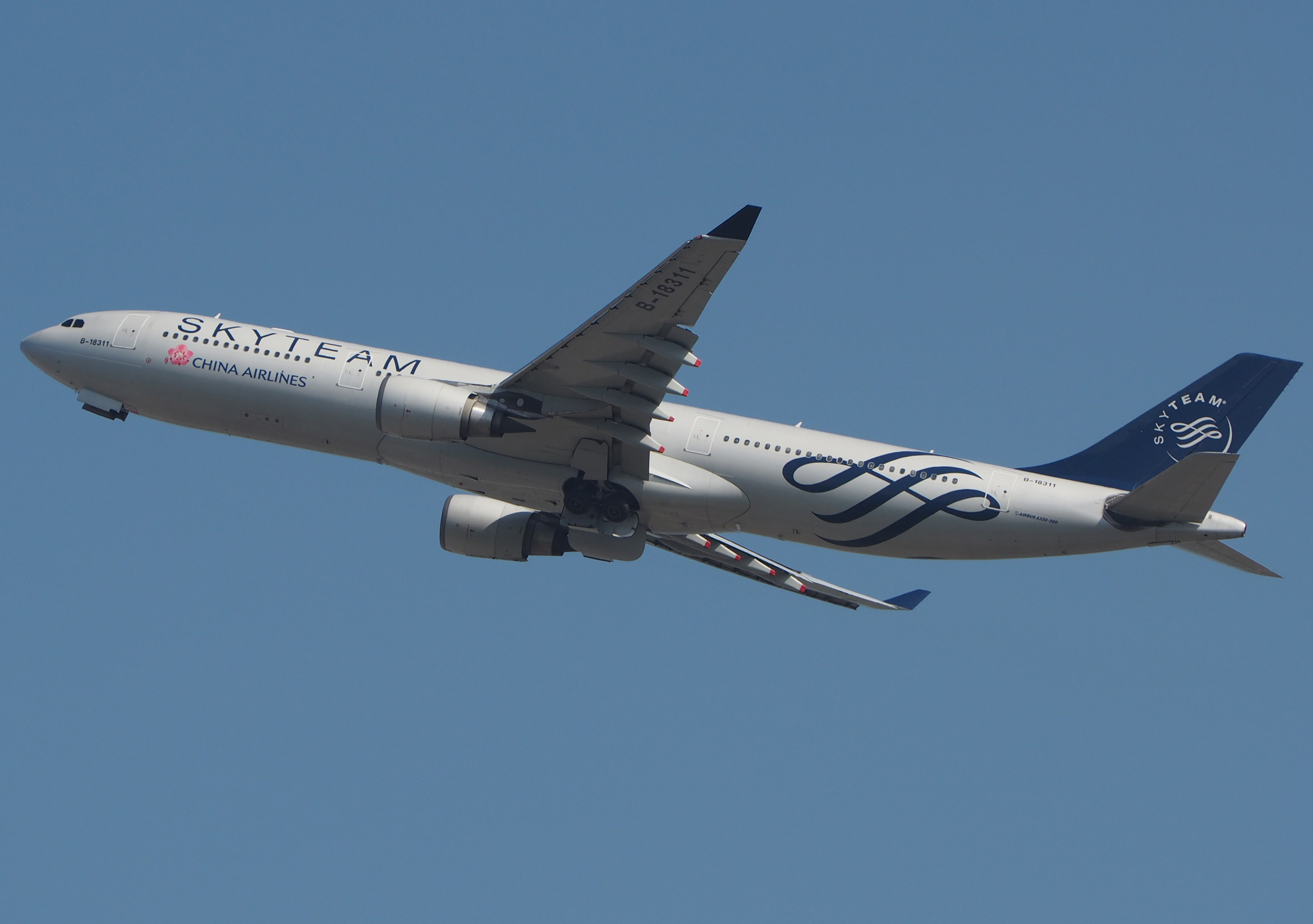
SkyTeam A330 B-18311

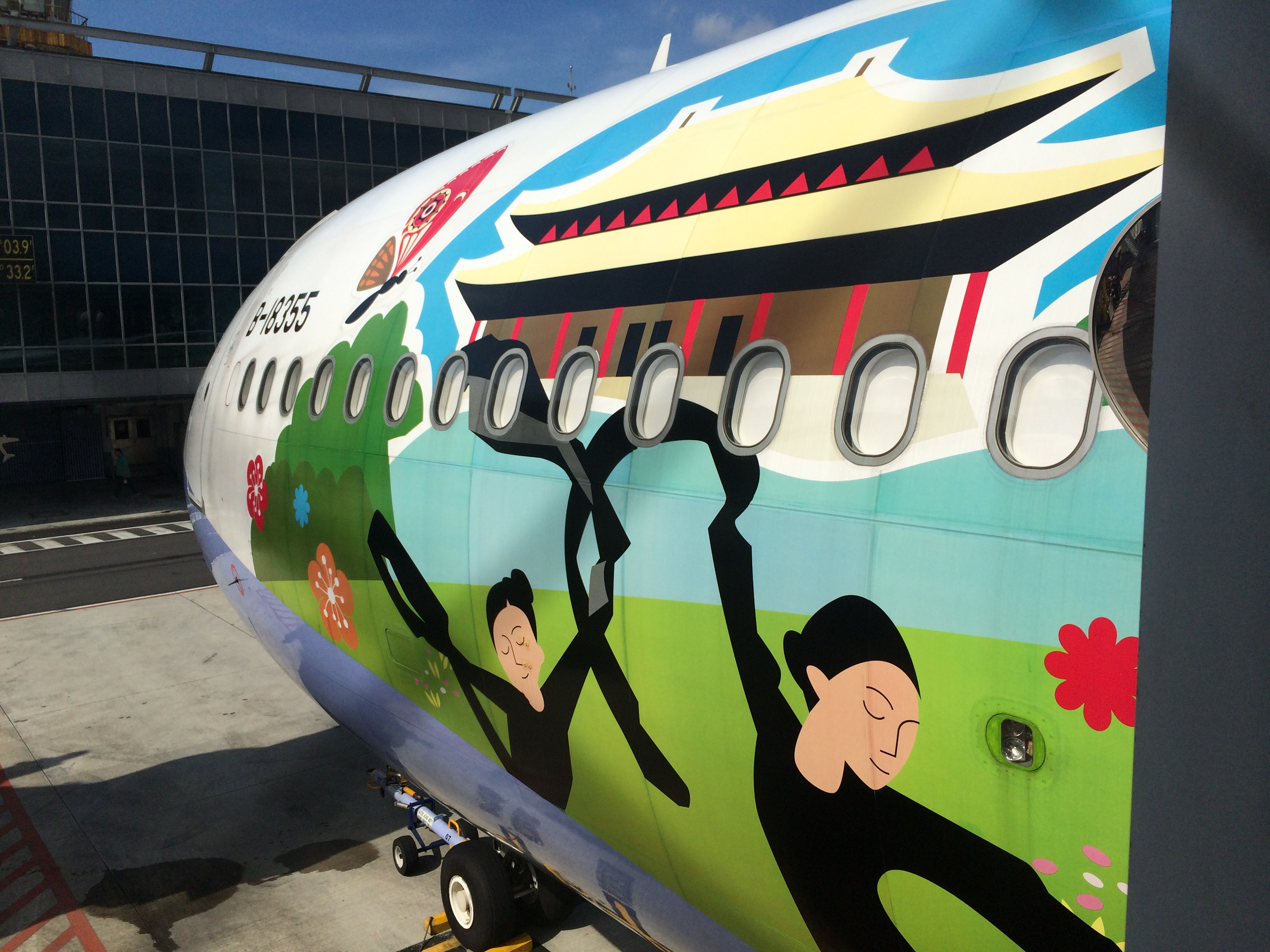
"Welcome To Taiwan" A330 close-up

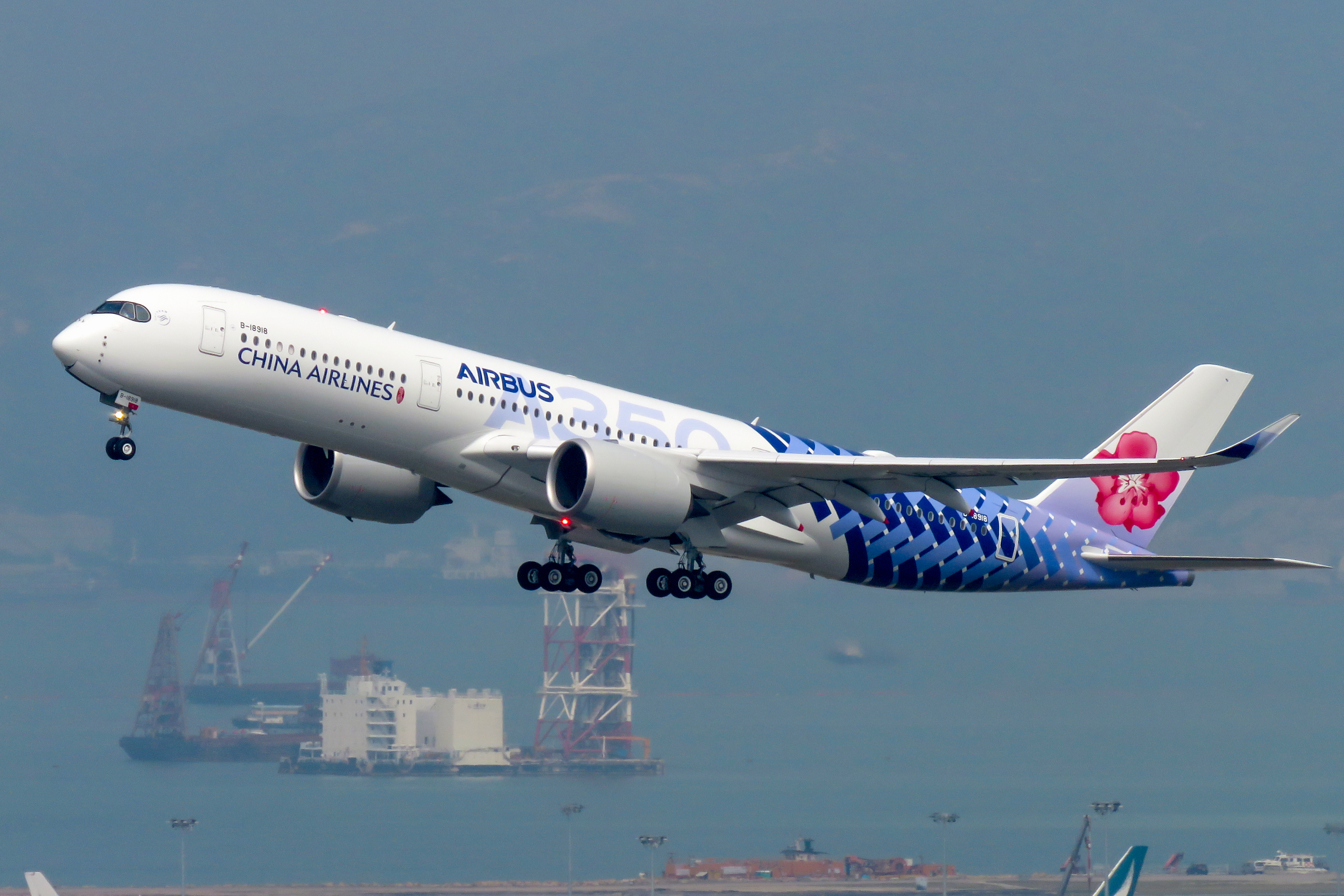
"Carbon Fibre" A350

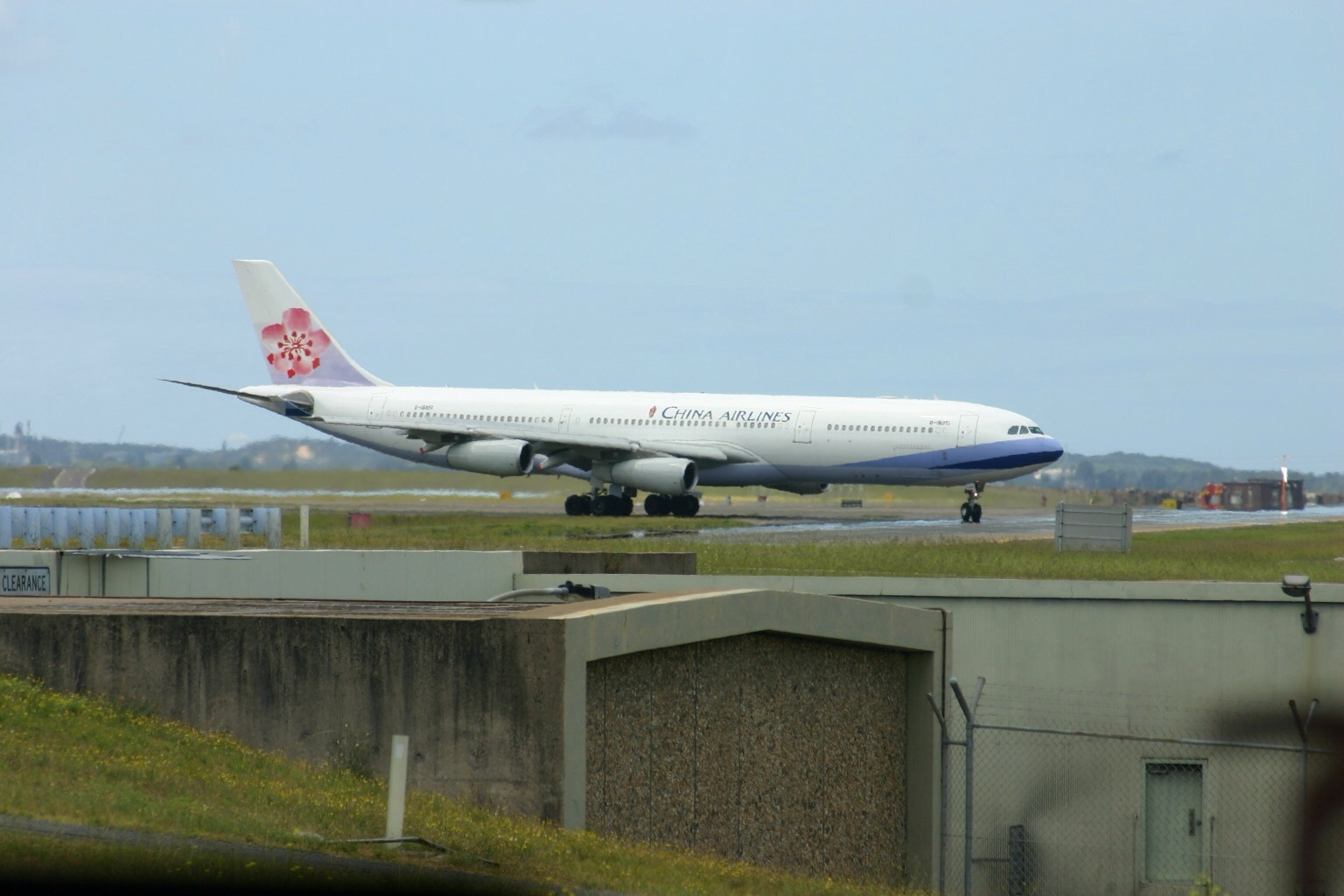
"The Original" Airbus A340

== Destinations ==
China Airlines destinations (June 2023) Taiwan Passenger and cargo Passenger only Cargo only

China Airlines currently operates over 1,400 flights weekly (including pure cargo flights) to 178 airports in 29 countries on 4 continents as of January 31, 2024 (excluding codeshare; brackets indicate future destinations). Japan is the most important market of the carrier, with over 180 flights weekly from multiple points in Taiwan to 14 Japanese destinations.

China Airlines has its largest hub at Taoyuan International Airport, which is the largest airport in Taiwan and is located near the national capital of Taipei. China Airlines operates out of both Terminal 1 and 2 at the airport. Operations to Europe, India, Korea, Hong Kong, Southeast Asia are located at Terminal 1, while those to China, Japan, North America and Oceania are located at Terminal 2. Additionally, China Airlines and its domestic subsidiary Mandarin Airlines operate numerous flights out of Kaohsiung International Airport and Taipei Songshan Airport, the downtown airport of Taipei. International flights from Songshan Airport to three Northeast Asian downtown airports, namely Tokyo–Haneda, Seoul–Gimpo, and Shanghai–Hongqiao, have important significance to the carrier, as those routes form a Northeast Asia Golden Flight Circle.

The expansion of China Airlines international presence has long been limited by the political status of Taiwan. Flights to mainland China were not permitted until 2003, when the carrier's Chinese New Year charter flight 585 from Taipei-Taoyuan to Shanghai–Pudong via Hong Kong made China Airlines the first Taiwanese carrier to legally land in mainland China and the first carrier to legally fly between the two areas after their split during the civil war. The carrier operated occasional cross-strait charter flights for another few years until 2008, when regular charters flights started. In 2009, a new air service agreement allowed China Airlines to start regularly scheduled flights to the Mainland. Since then, China has quickly become the second-largest market for China Airlines, with over 130 flights to 33 destinations across the Mainland.

=== Route plans ===
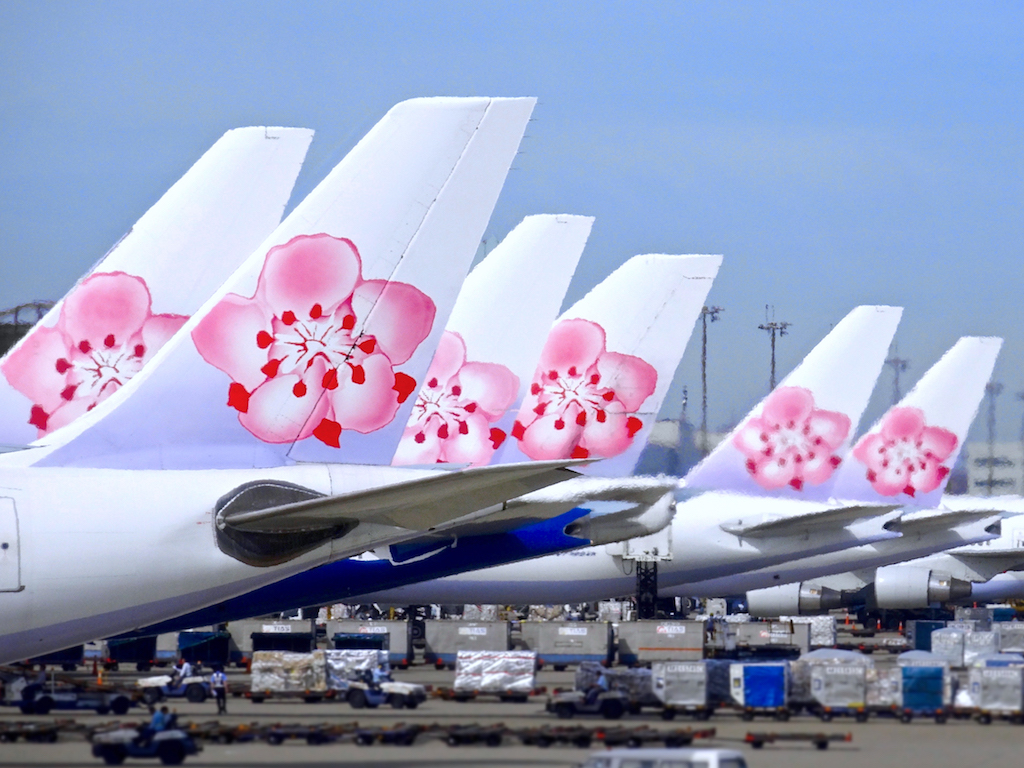
China Airlines aircraft line-up at Taoyuan International Airport in 2016

Between 2011 and 2015, China Airlines focused on strengthening its regional network; starting 2015 until 2020, the carrier is strengthening and expanding its European, North American, and Oceanian network with the new long-haul fleet. After upgrading all its European routes to nonstop services, in late 2017, the carrier launched four weekly services to London Gatwick Airport. However, due to the COVID-19 pandemic, flights to London were routed to Heathrow Airport. Although it was planned to move back to Gatwick in March 2021, China Airlines opted to remain serving Heathrow as their scheduled London operation. In France, as China Airlines does not have rights to operate flights to Paris, the airline cooperated with SkyTeam-partner Air France to launch nonstop flights to the French capital on Air France's airplanes in April 2018. China Airlines sells 40% of the seats on the flight. In July 2023, a twice-weekly service to Prague was launched. In America, daily flights were launched between Taipei and Ontario (California) International Airport in Greater Los Angeles in March 2018. Additionally, the carrier has expressed interests in launching European destinations such as Barcelona, Madrid and Warsaw; in North America, Atlanta, Boston, Chicago, Seattle, Montréal, and Toronto. On December 3, 2025, China Airlines announced that it would start service to Phoenix Sky Harbor three days a week using the A350.

Regarding its regional network, China Airlines is actively supporting the Taiwanese government's "New Southbound Policy" by increasing flights to destinations in southeast Asia such as Kuala Lumpur, Bangkok, Jakarta, Singapore, and Manila. On the other hand, cross-strait routes are being downsized due to tense cross-strait relations.

=== Codeshare agreements ===
China Airlines have Codeshare agreements with the following airline partners:

- Air Europa
- Air France
- Bangkok Airways
- British Airways
- China Eastern Airlines
- China Southern Airlines
- Delta Air Lines
- Deutsche Bahn (railway)
- Garuda Indonesia
- ITA Airways
- Japan Airlines
- J-Air
- KLM
- Korean Air
- Mandarin Airlines (subsidiary)
- Malaysia Airlines
- Philippine Airlines
- Qantas
- Royal Brunei Airlines
- Scandinavian Airlines
- Shanghai Airlines
- Vietnam Airlines
- WestJet
- XiamenAir

Additionally, China Airlines is planning on codesharing with British Airways. Initial agreements have been struck to cooperate from Taipei-Taoyuan to London-Heathrow and beyond.

=== Interline agreements ===
China Airlines have Interline agreements with the following airline partners:

- Air North
- Emirates
- Hahn Air
- Kuwait Airways
- Lao Airlines
- Singapore Airlines
- Southwest Airlines
- Sun Country Airlines
- Taiwan High Speed Rail (railway)

== Fleet ==
=== Current fleet ===
As of August 2026, China Airlines operates the following aircraft:

China Airlines fleet
Aircraft	In service	Orders	Passengers				Notes
Aircraft	In service	Orders	J	W	Y	Total	Notes
Airbus A321neo	22	2	12	—	168	180	Leased 22 and firm-ordered 11 with 5 options, reduced to 2. Deliveries from 2021 to 2027. Replacing Boeing 737-800.
Airbus A330-300	12	—	36	—	277	313	To be retired and replaced by Boeing 787.
Airbus A330-300	12	—	30	—	277	307	To be retired and replaced by Boeing 787.
Airbus A350-900	18	3	32	31	243	306	1 leased aircraft delivered in January 2024 (with previous operator SAS' cabin configuration). Acquire from 3 former Sichuan Airlines retained original interior. Airbus will retrofit cabins of all 15 aircraft with the 1st one to enter service in 2027.
Airbus A350-900	18	3	40	32	228	300	1 leased aircraft delivered in January 2024 (with previous operator SAS' cabin configuration). Acquire from 3 former Sichuan Airlines retained original interior. Airbus will retrofit cabins of all 15 aircraft with the 1st one to enter service in 2027.
Airbus A350-900	18	3	28	—	303	331	1 leased aircraft delivered in January 2024 (with previous operator SAS' cabin configuration). Acquire from 3 former Sichuan Airlines retained original interior. Airbus will retrofit cabins of all 15 aircraft with the 1st one to enter service in 2027.
Airbus A350-1000	—	15	TBA				Deliveries from 2029. Replacing Boeing 777-300ER.
Boeing 737-800	5	—	8	—	150	158	To be retired and replaced by Airbus A321neo.
Boeing 737-800	5	—	8	—	153	161	To be retired and replaced by Airbus A321neo.
Boeing 777-300ER	10	—	40	62	256	358	To be retired and replaced by Airbus A350-1000 and Boeing 777-9.
Boeing 777–9	—	15	TBA				Deliveries from 2030. Replacing Boeing 777-300ER.
Boeing 787-9	—	18	30	28	230	288	Original order for 16 787-9s with 8 options later firmed up. 6 787-9s were converted to 787-10s. Deliveries of 787-9s to begin in the first quarter of 2027. Replacing Airbus A330-300.
Boeing 787-10	—	6	TBA				Original order for 16 787-9s with 8 options later firmed up. 6 787-9s were converted to 787-10s. Deliveries of 787-9s to begin in the first quarter of 2027. Replacing Airbus A330-300.
China Airlines Cargo fleet
Boeing 747-400F	8	—	Cargo				To be retired and replaced by Boeing 777-8F.
Boeing 777F	10	2	Cargo				
Boeing 777-8F	—	8	Cargo				Deliveries from 2030. To replace Boeing 747-400F.
Total	85	69					

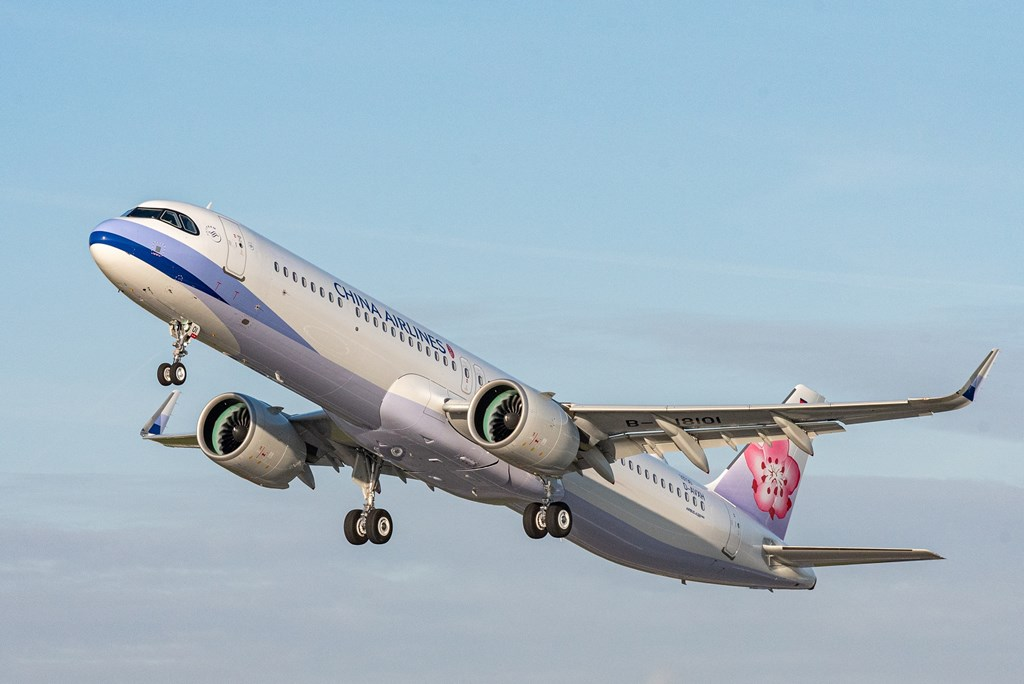
Airbus A321neo

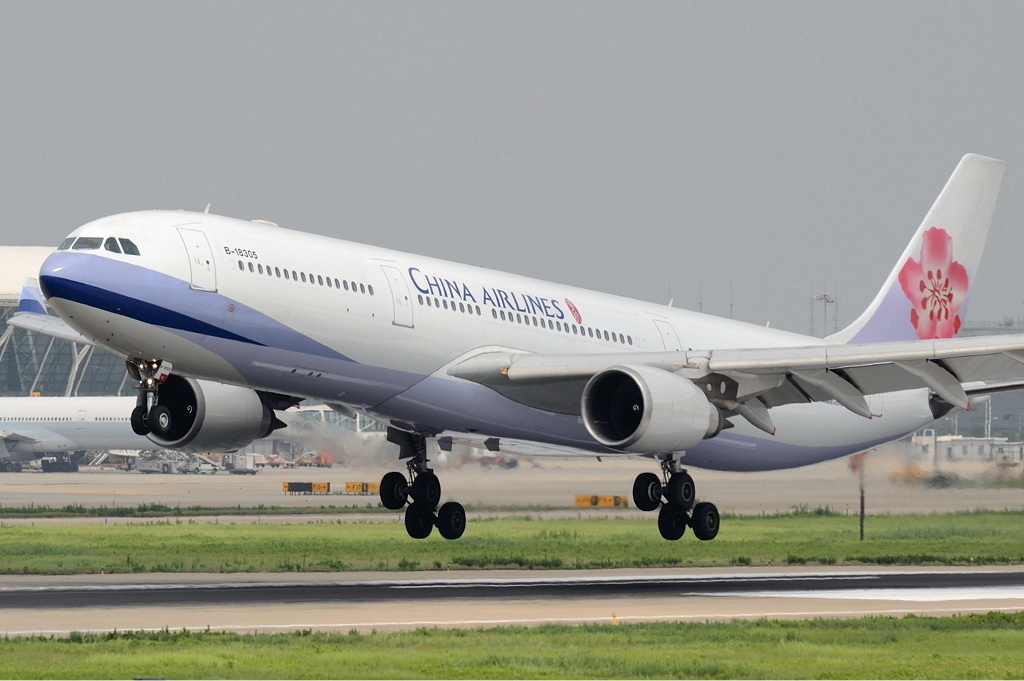
Airbus A330-300

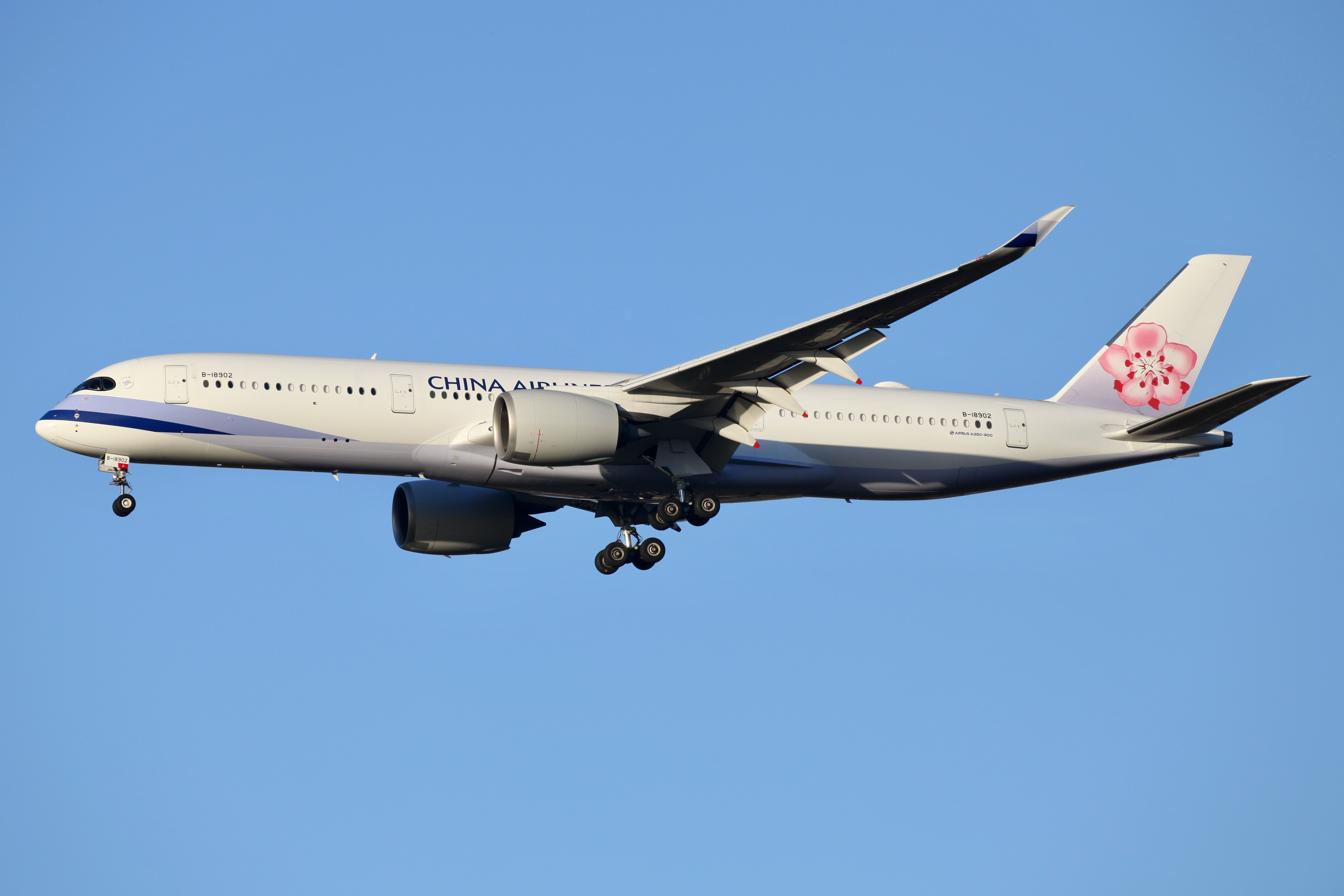
Airbus A350-900

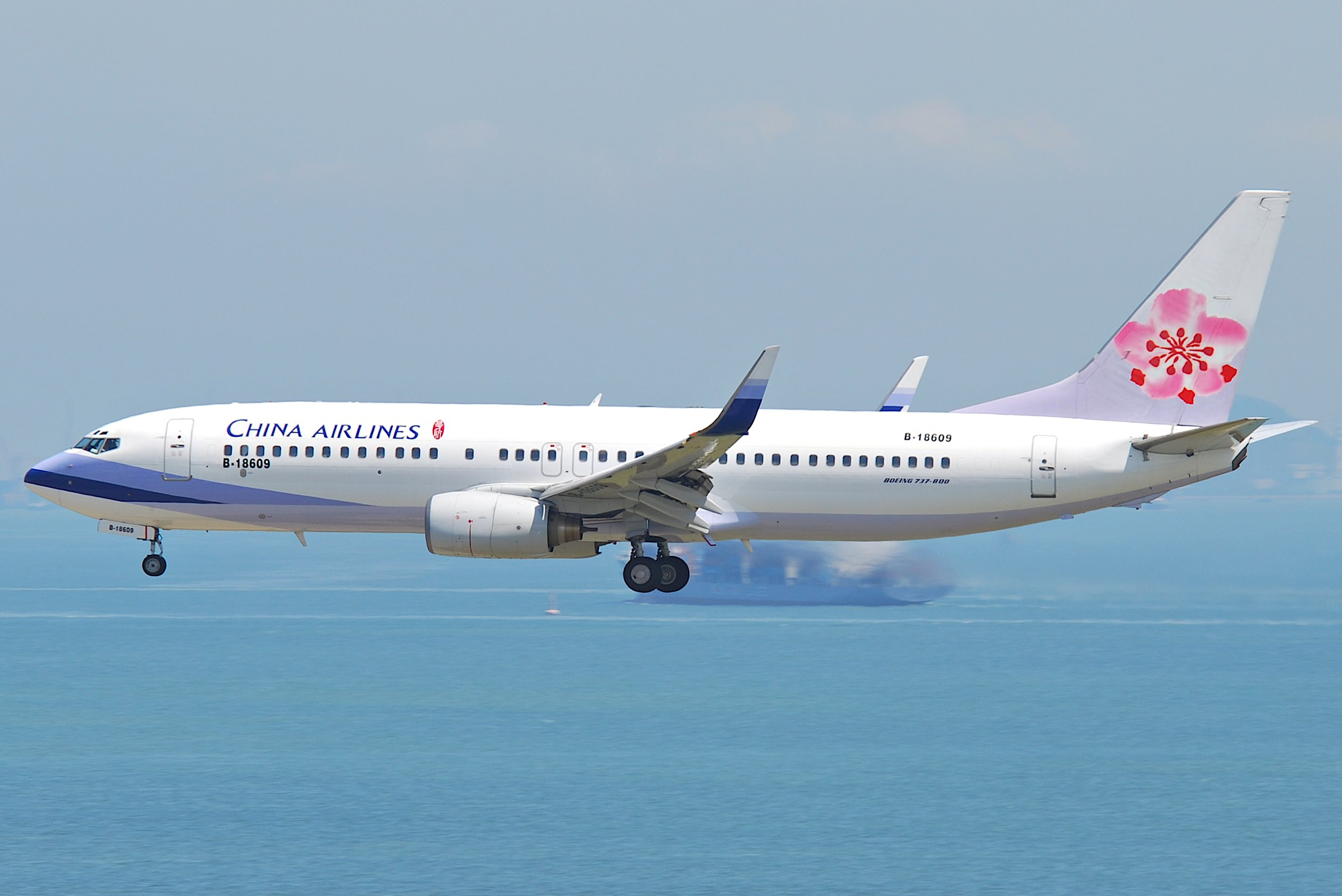
Boeing 737-800

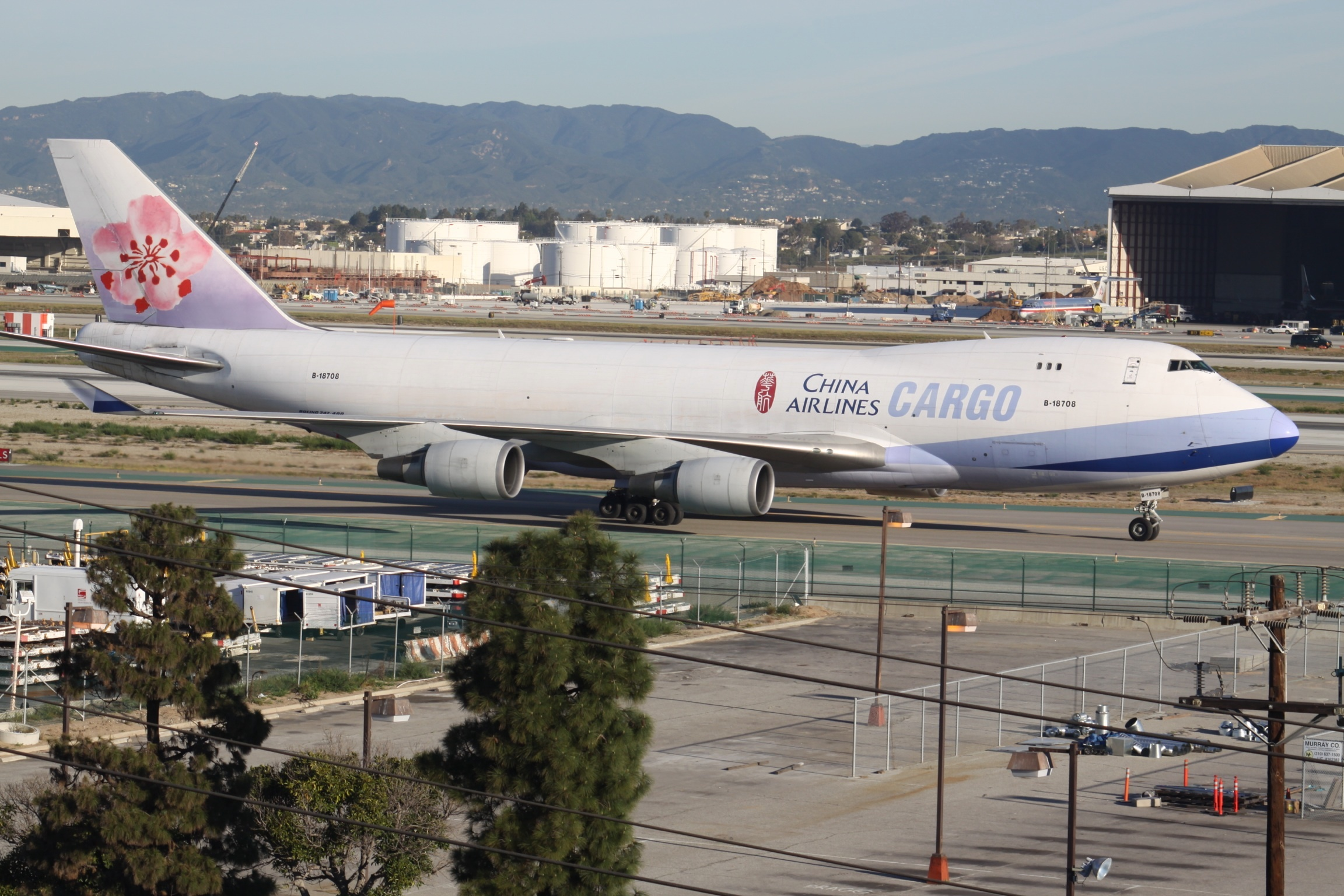
Boeing 747-400F

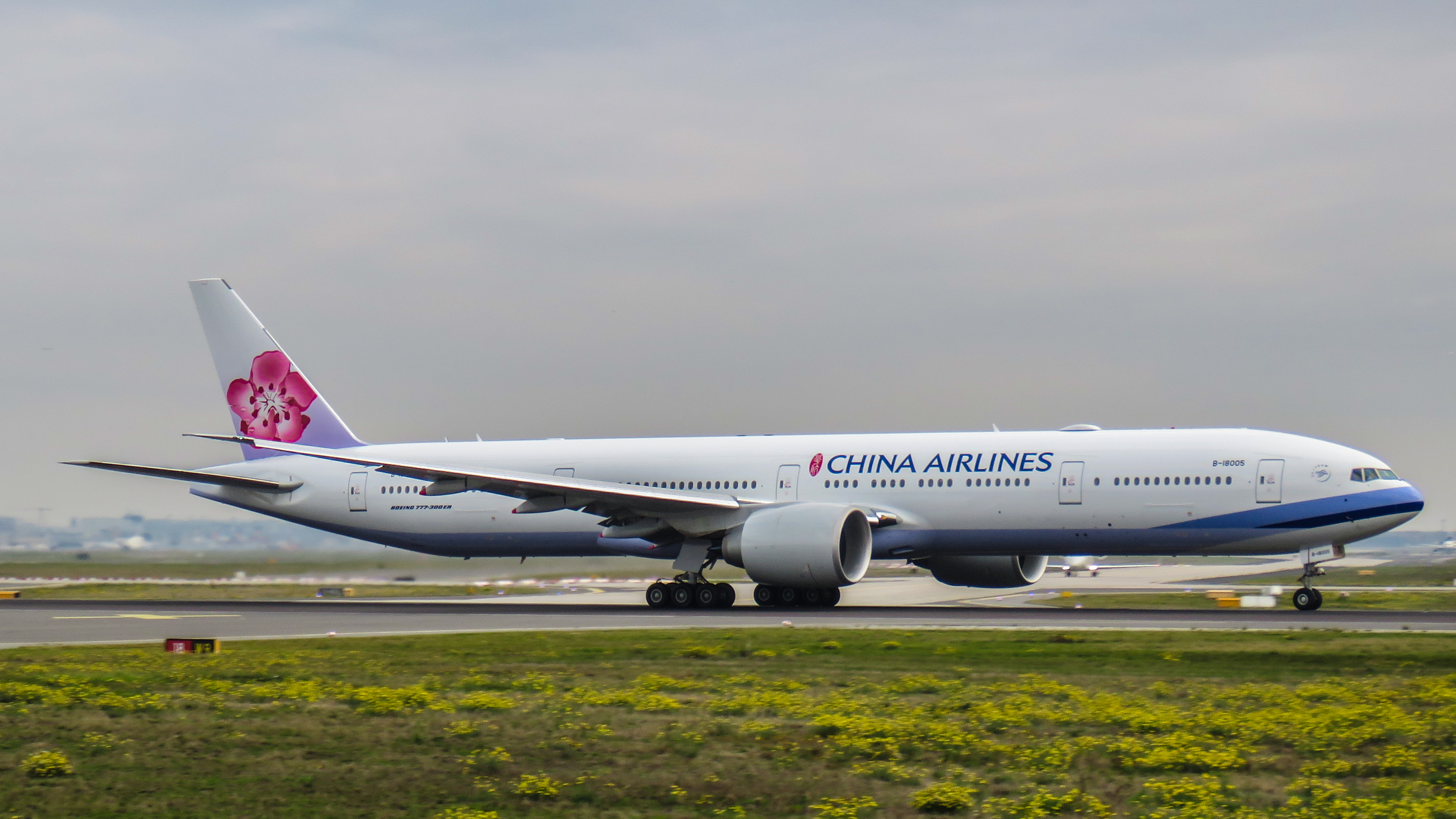
Boeing 777-300ER

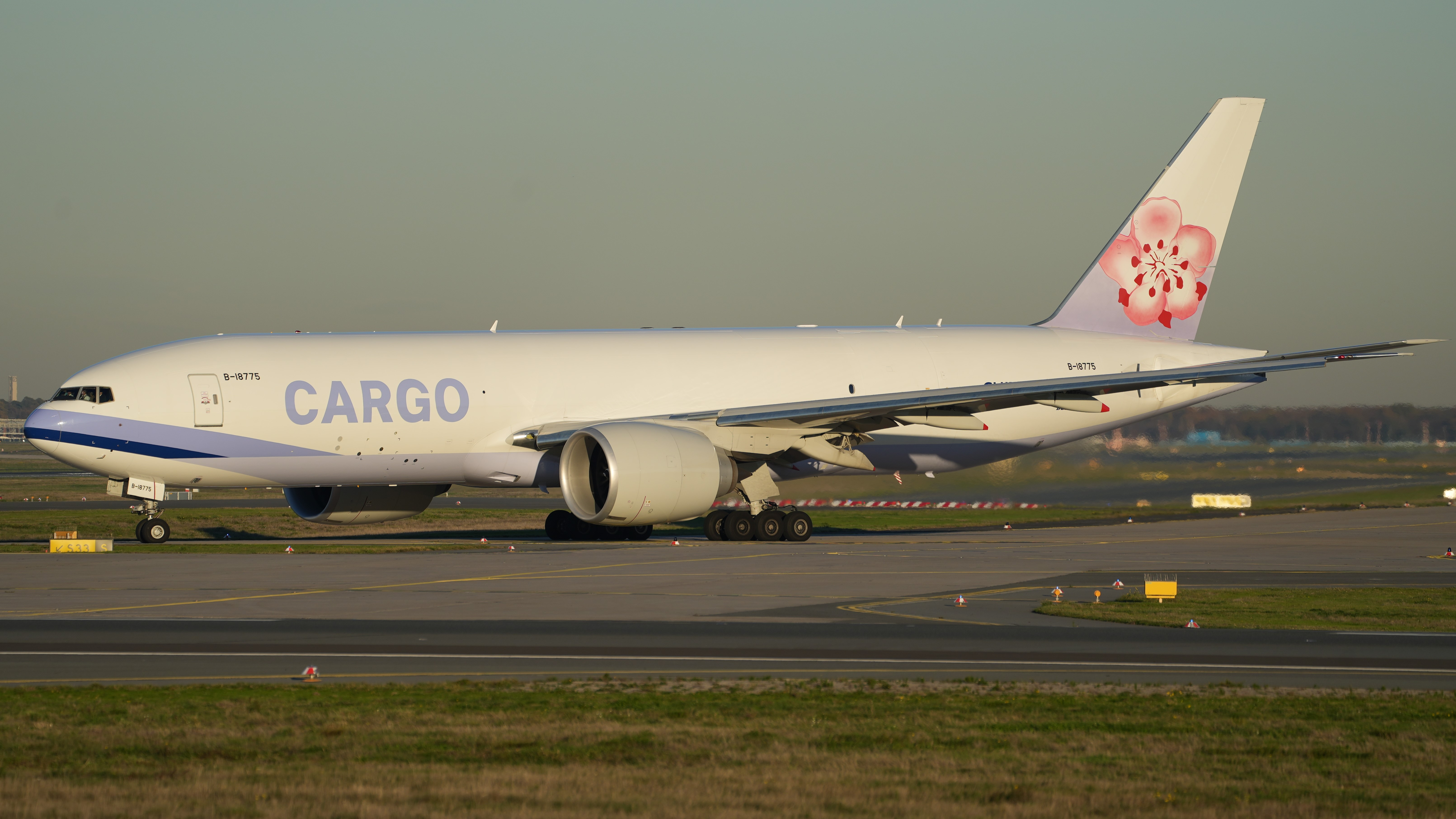
Boeing 777F

=== Former fleet ===
China Airlines previously operated these aircraft:

- Airbus A300B4-220
- Airbus A300-600R
- Airbus A320
- Airbus A340-300
- Boeing 707
- Boeing 727
- Boeing 737-200
- Boeing 737-400
- Boeing 747SP
- Boeing 747-200B
- Boeing 747-200B Combi
- Boeing 747-400
- Boeing 767-200
- Douglas C-47
- Douglas C-54 Skymaster
- McDonnell Douglas MD-11
- NAMC YS-11
- PBY Catalina

=== Gallery ===
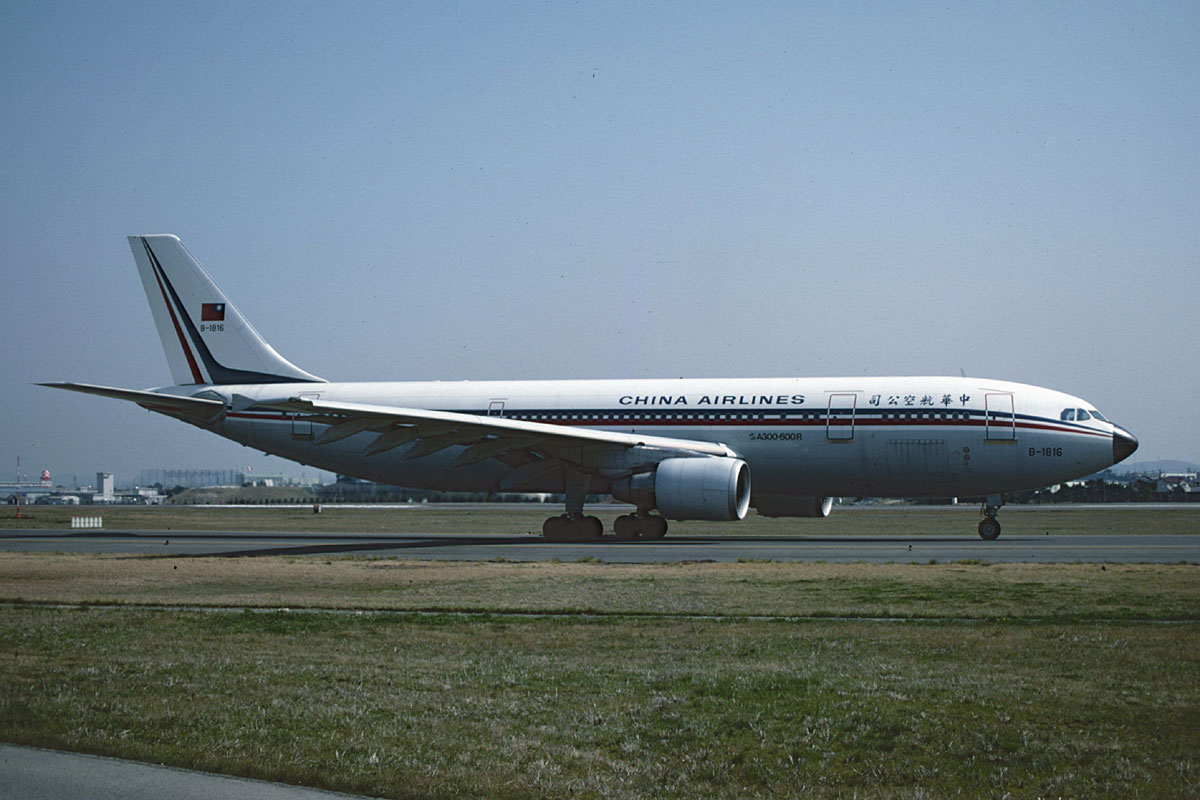
China Airlines A300-600R in older livery. This aircraft was involved in a crash as China Airlines Flight 140 in 1994.

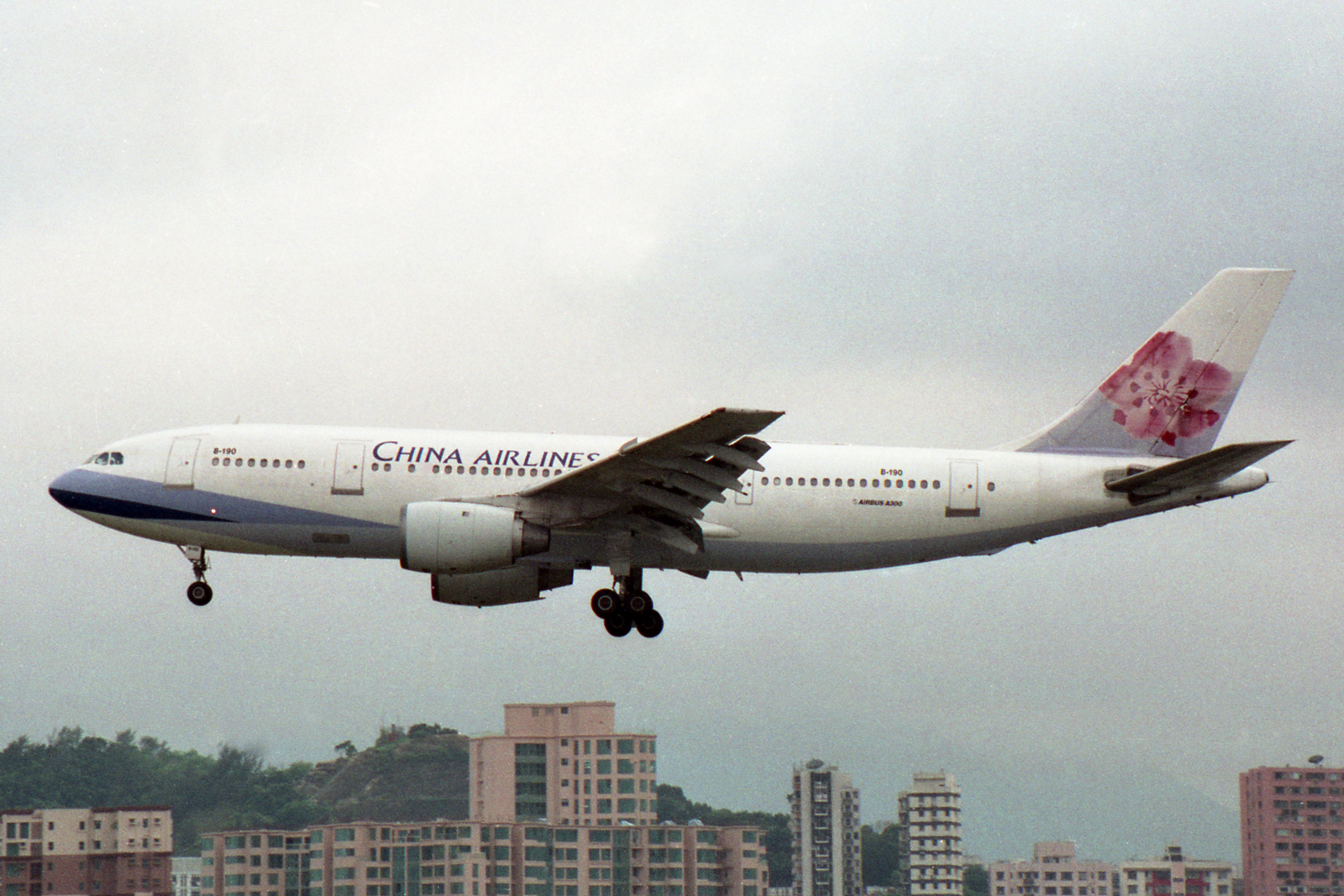
China Airlines Airbus A300-B4

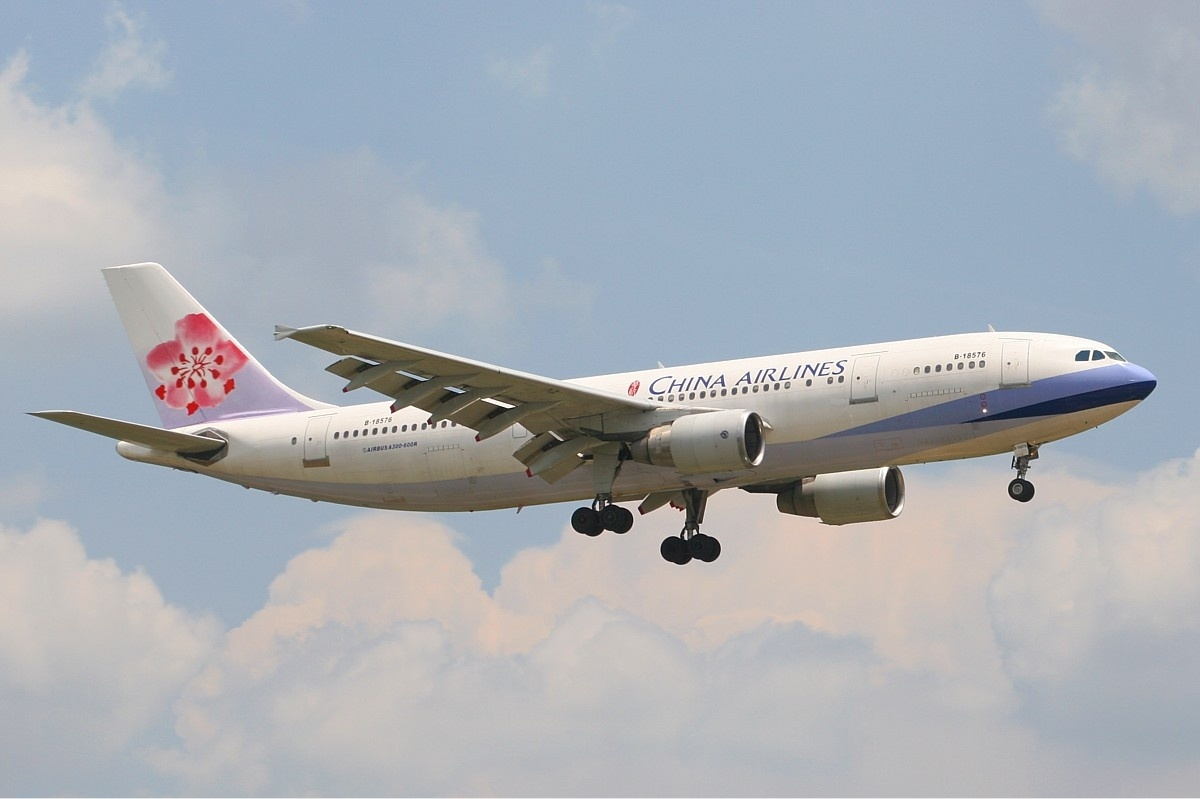
China Airlines Airbus A300-600R

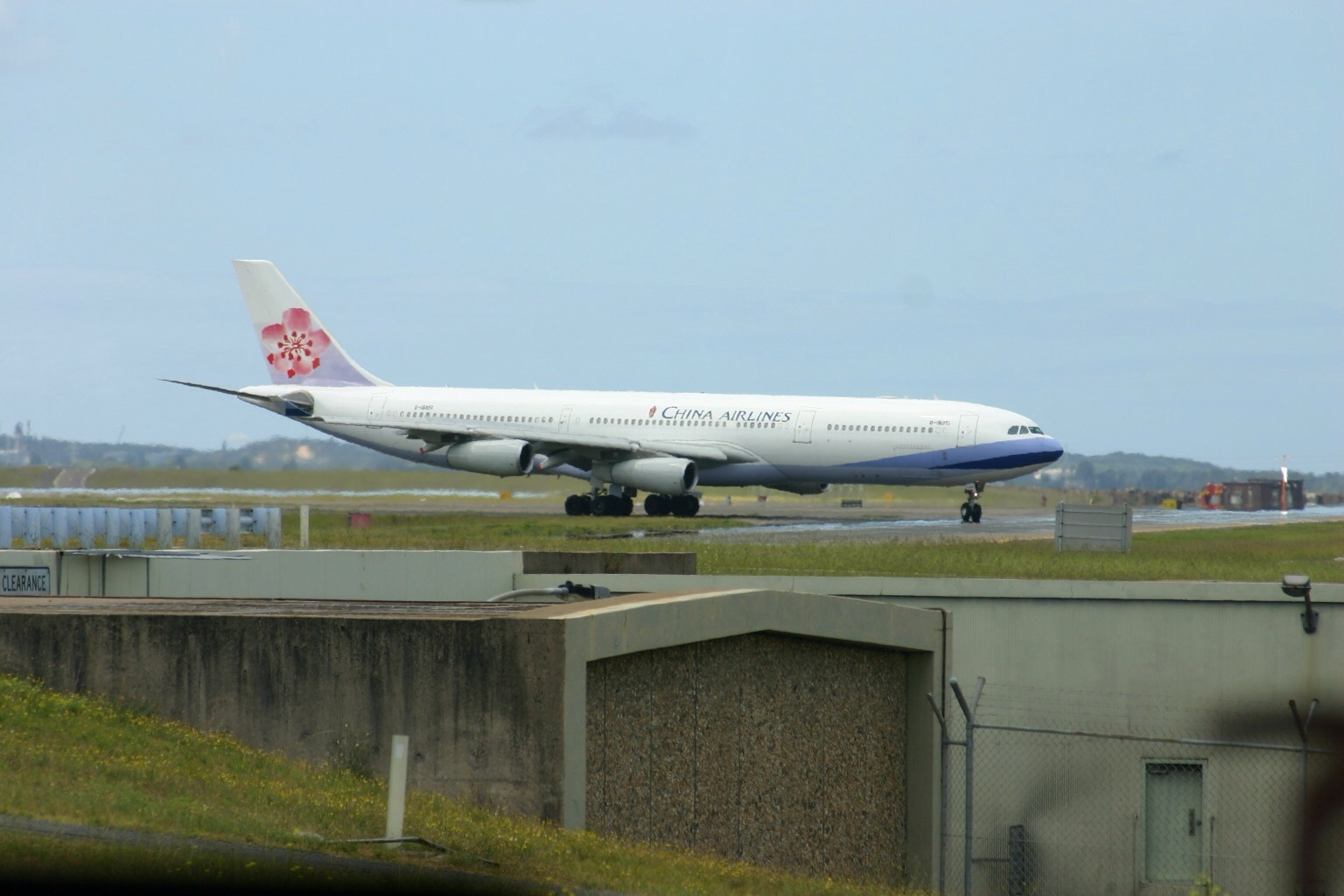
China Airlines Airbus A340-300

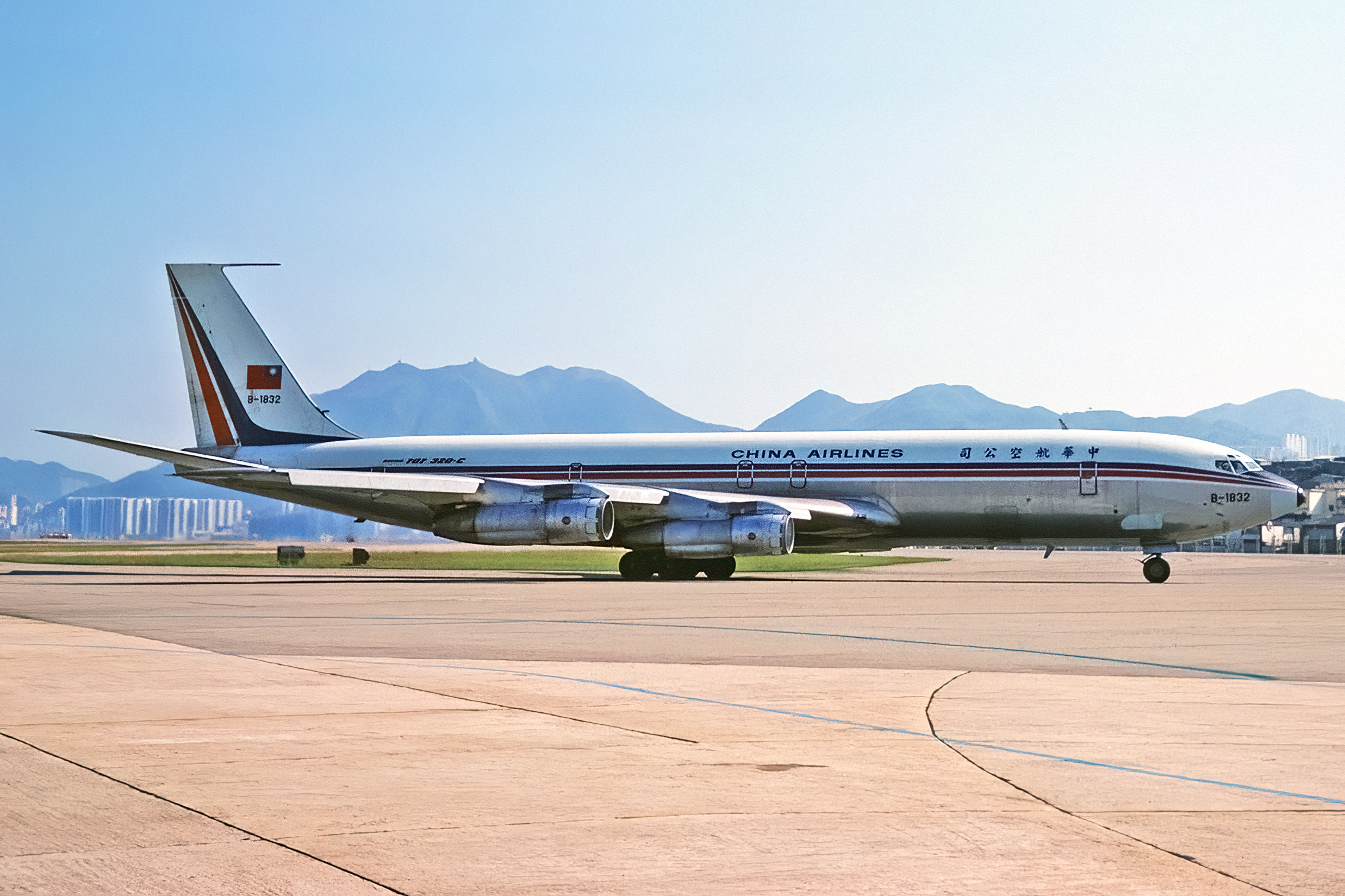
China Airlines Boeing 707

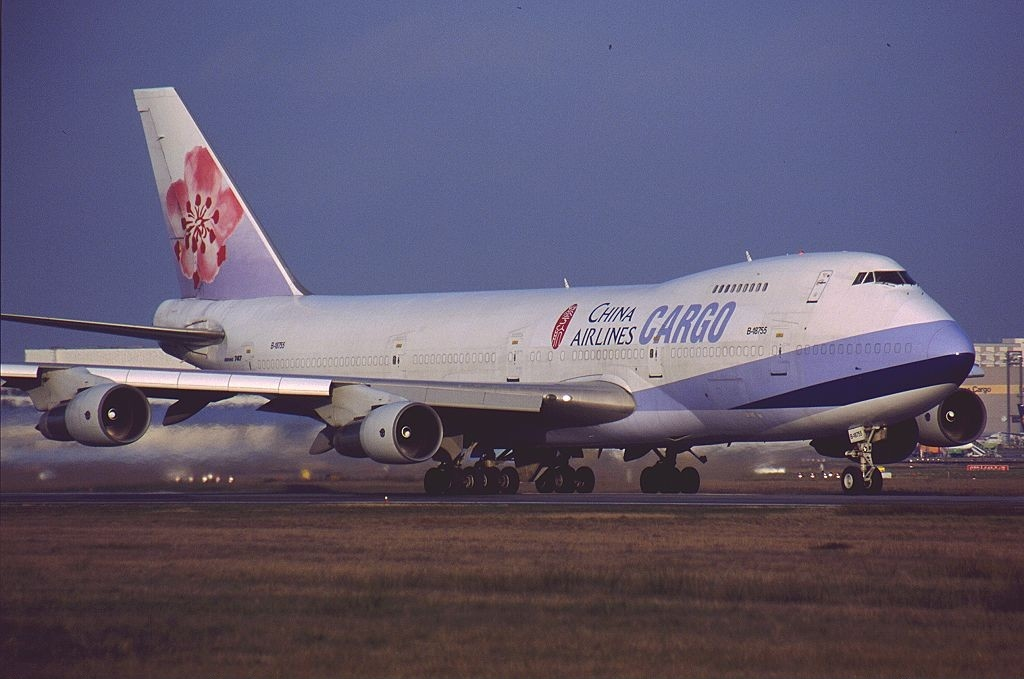
China Airlines Boeing 747-200 SF

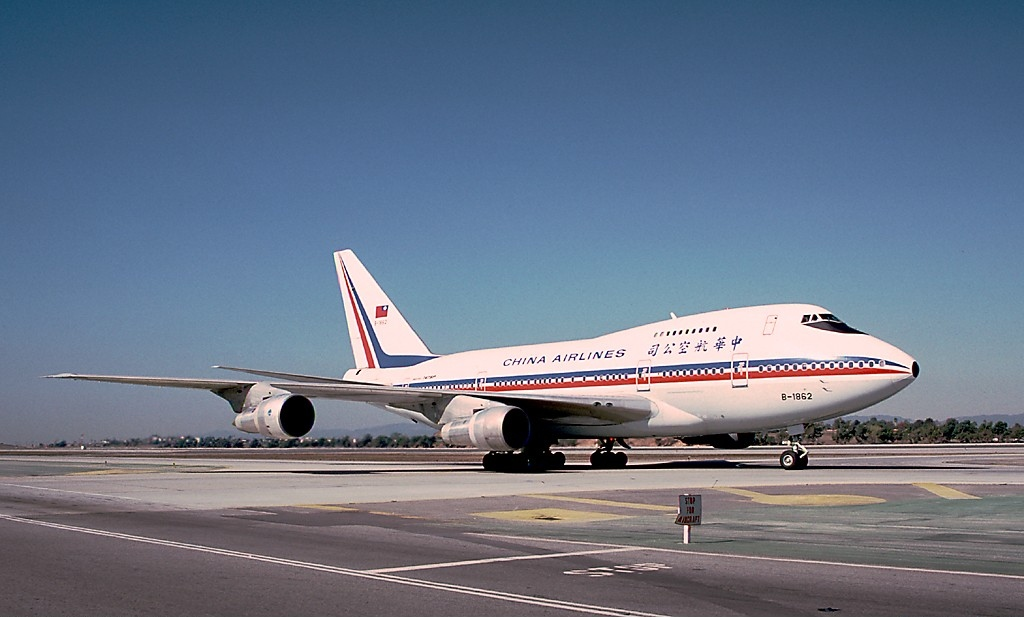
China Airlines Boeing 747SP

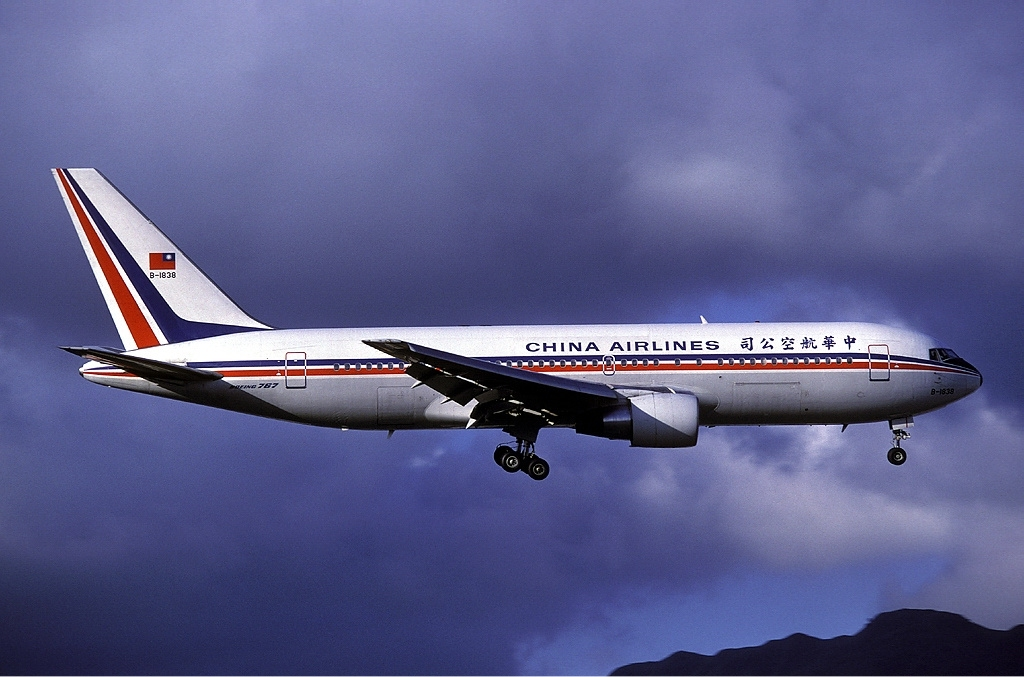
China Airlines Boeing 767-200

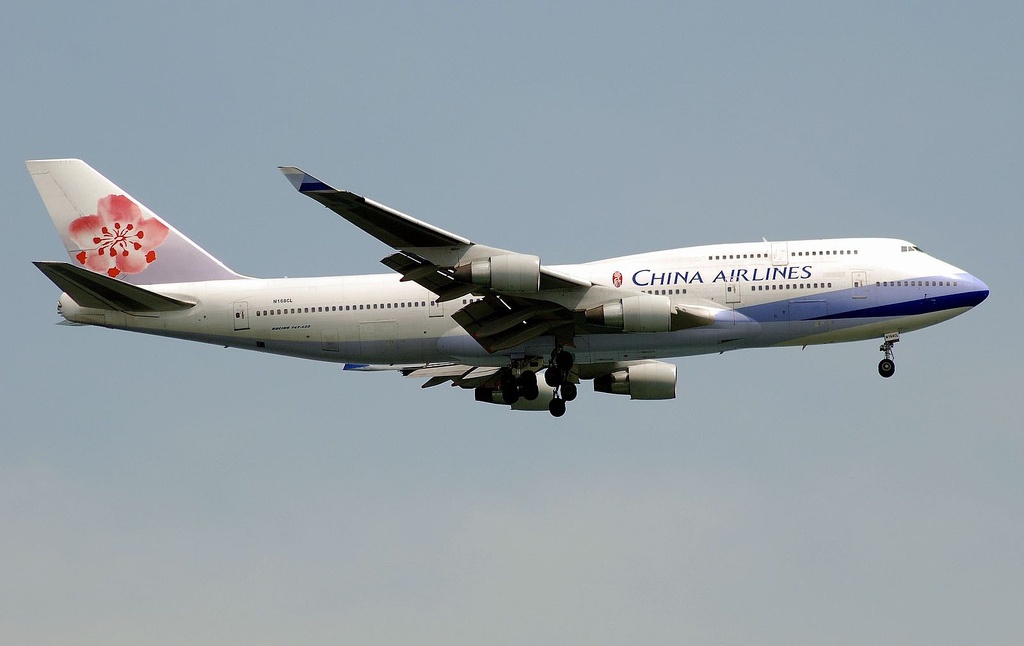
China Airlines Boeing 747-400

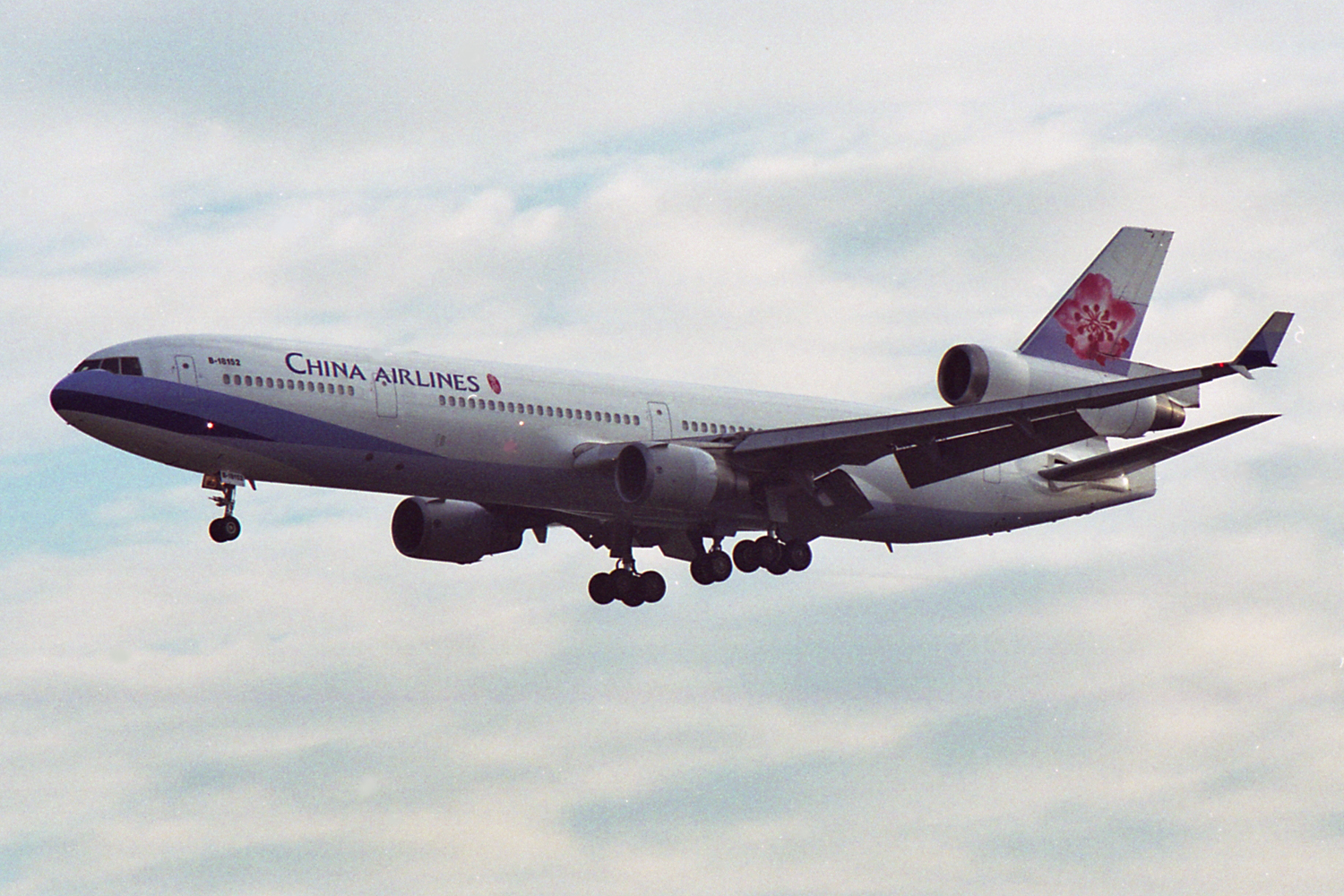
China Airlines MD-11

=== Renewal plans ===
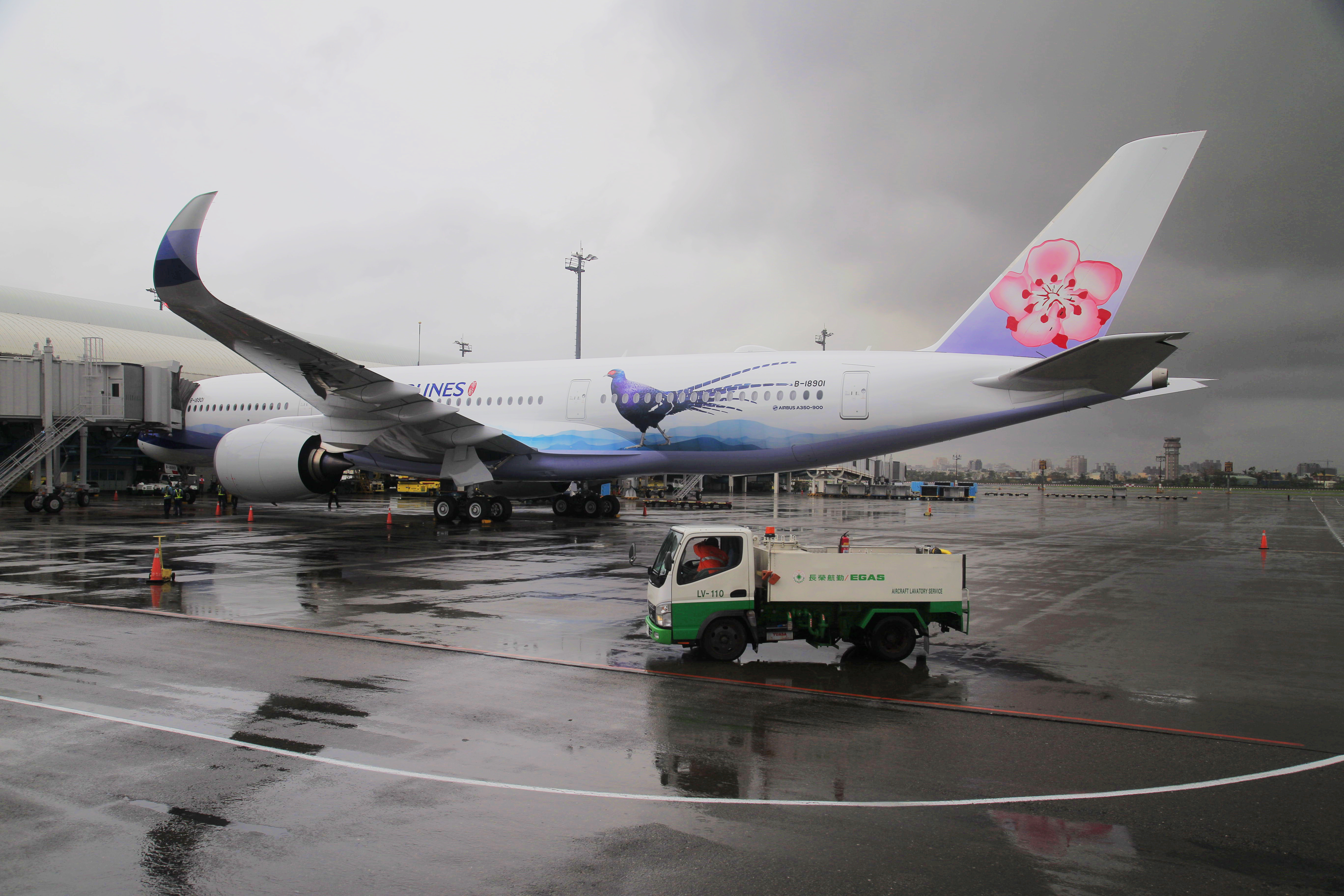
China Airlines Airbus A350-900 with Mikado pheasant livery

In May 2019, China Airlines announced that it will be introducing the Airbus A321neo to replace its Boeing 737-800 fleet. The airline will take delivery of 25 A321neos, including 14 leased and 11 purchased, starting in 2021. The order with Airbus also includes the option for five more of the type.

China Airlines also has options for six A350s. Decision to switch the options to firm orders will be based upon the performance of the aircraft on European nonstop routes. The airline has taken a cautious attitude towards ordering the larger A350-1000 variant due to the large capacity.

Regarding the Airbus A330-300, replacement plans have been underway since 2017. Previously in 2016, a retrofit program was announced to upgrade the in-flight products on the A330. The plan was suspended indefinitely in favor of ordering and leasing new aircraft. On August 30, 2022, the airline announced its decision to order Boeing 787-9 as the A330-300 replacement. On September 29, 2022, China Airlines made a purchase order for 16 Boeing 787–9 wide-body aircraft. On December 19, 2024, the airline announced the intent to order 10 Boeing 777-9s and 10 Airbus A350-1000s to supplement and renew its long-haul fleet. The Airbus A350-1000 order was finalized on March 31, 2025 with 10 firm orders and 5 options, and the Boeing 777–9 order was finalized on May 8, 2025 with 10 firm orders and 5 options.

=== Retirement plans ===
In June 2017, China Airlines completed the retirement of its entire Airbus A340-300 fleet and all Boeing 747-400 delivered before 2004. It has also phased out most Boeing 737-800 delivered before 2014. The retired A340-300 and Boeing 747-400 are either stored at the aircraft boneyard at Victorville Airport or sold. All stored passenger aircraft are to be sold eventually. The last of the newer Boeing 747-400 passenger fleet with the General Electric CF6 engines was retired in March 2021.

=== Cargo fleet plans ===
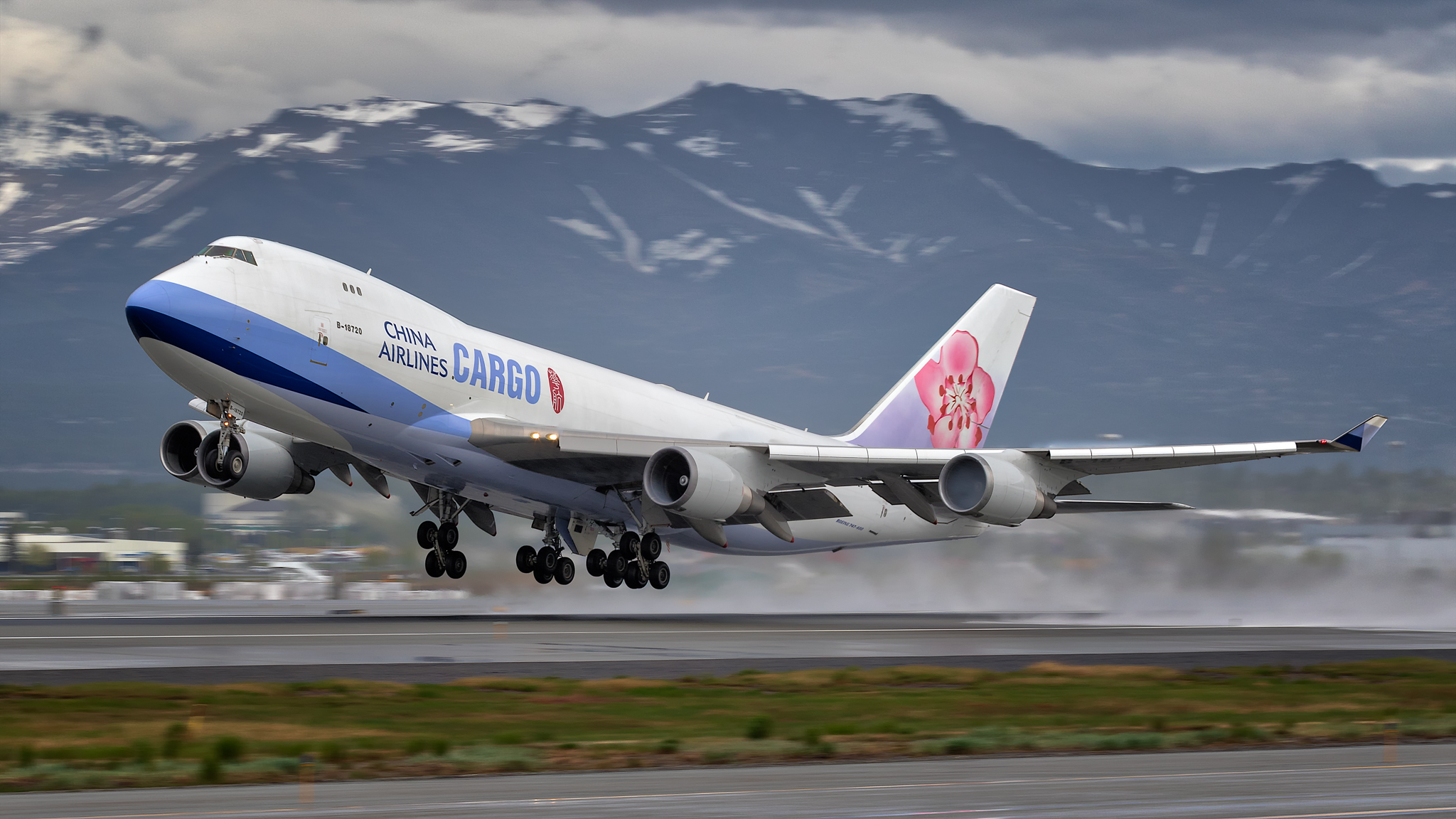
China Airlines Cargo Boeing 747-400F leaving Anchorage

China Airlines Cargo, the freight division of China Airlines, currently operates a fleet of 21 freighters to 33 destinations across Asia, Europe and North America. The division also utilizes the cargo space on passenger aircraft of the group. In May 2019, China Airlines signed a Memorandum of Understanding (MoU) with Boeing for three orders and three options of the Boeing 777F. The 3 options were later changed to firm orders. The 777F will partially replace the 747-400F fleet. In January 2022, an order for four more 777F aircraft was placed. In August 2022, the airlines said that Airbus A350F and Boeing 777-8F are both candidates for its next-gen freighters replacing the rest of the 747-400F fleet. On December 19, 2024, the airline announced the intent to order 4 Boeing 777-8Fs to supplement the existing 777-200F fleet. The order was finalized on May 8, 2025 with 4 firm orders and 4 options.

== Services ==
=== Inflight Meals ===
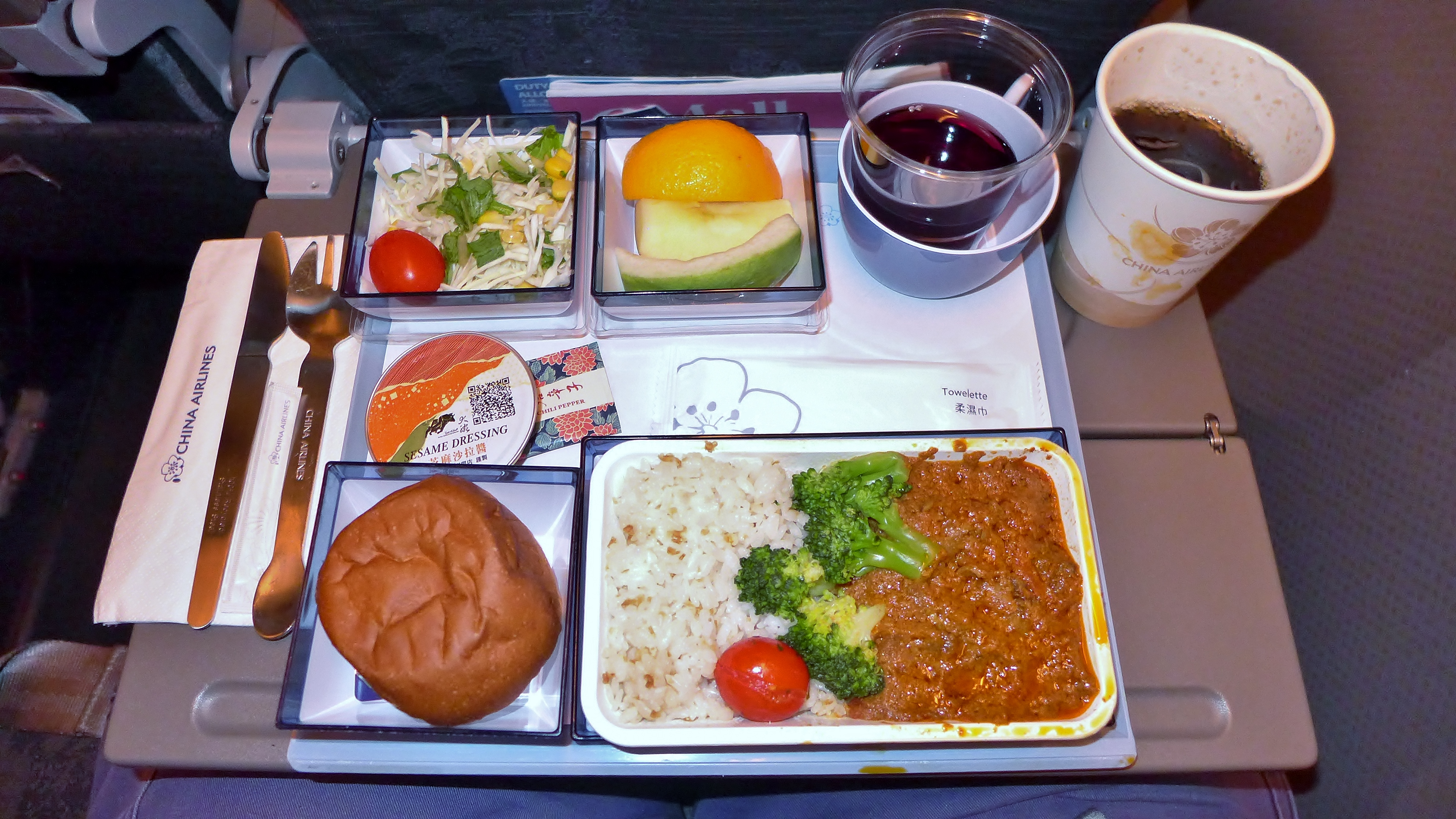
An economy class beef curry meal on a flight from Taipei to Kuala Lumpur

China Airlines offers complimentary meals to all passengers. Meals can range from Taiwanese dishes like Braised Pork Rice, to international dishes like Beef with Potatoes. Special meals can be ordered ahead of time.

=== Dynasty Flyer ===
Dynasty Flyer is China Airlines' frequent flyer program. There are four tiers where three elite tiers are Gold, Emerald, and Paragon. Members can qualify for these elite tiers by earning enough air miles and/or segments within 12 calendar months. Elite members have more privileges such as access to the VIP Lounge, a higher checked baggage allowance, and being able to upgrade their ticket to a different cabin.

==== Greater China Connection ====
In January 2013, SkyTeam-members China Airlines, China Eastern Airlines, China Southern Airlines, and XiamenAir announced plans to establish Greater China Connection. The partnership ensures that members flying the four airlines can enjoy matched benefits and freely change flights to any Greater China Connection partner flights.

=== Dynasty Lounges ===
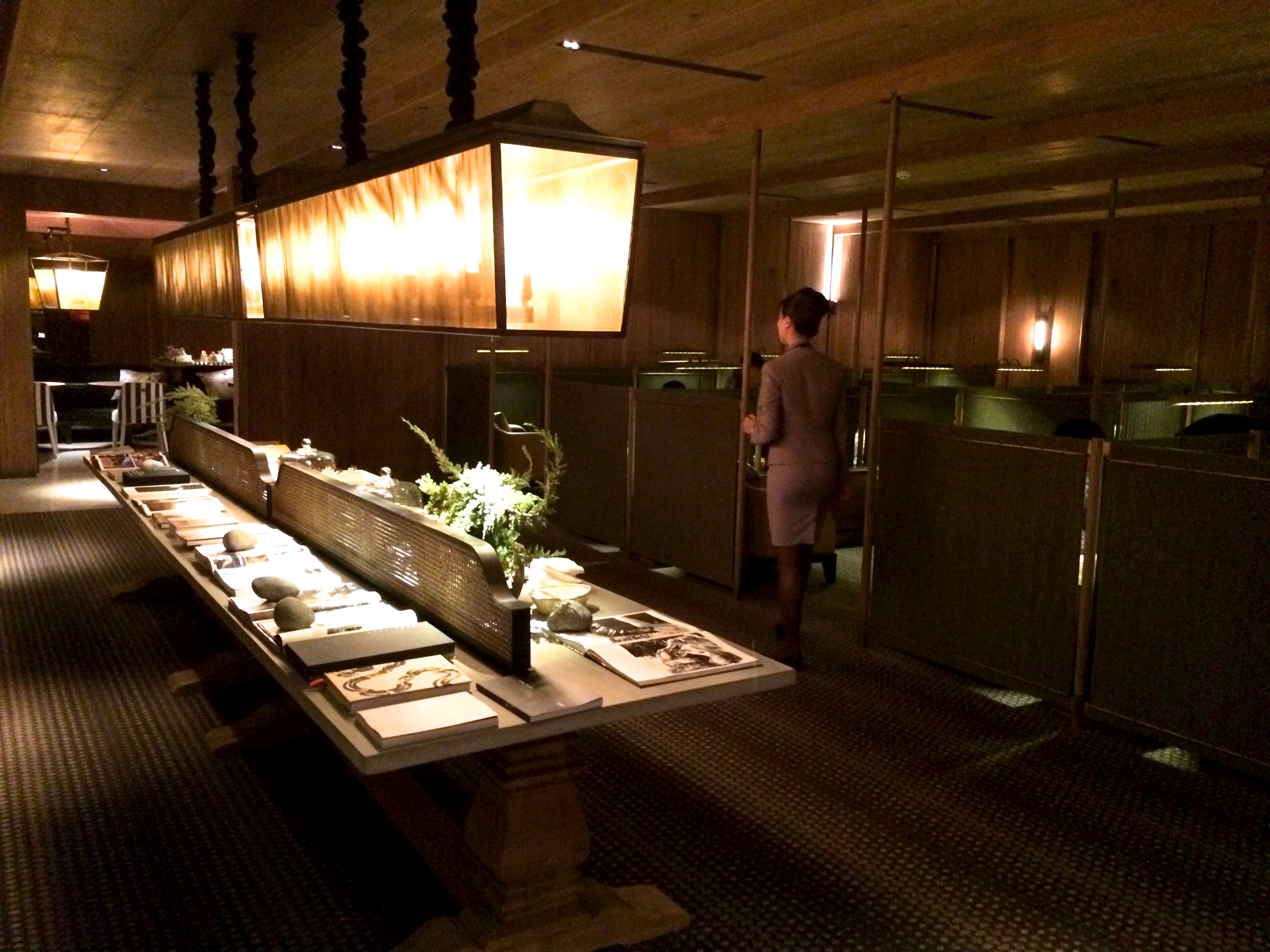
TPE T1 Lounge Exclusive Area

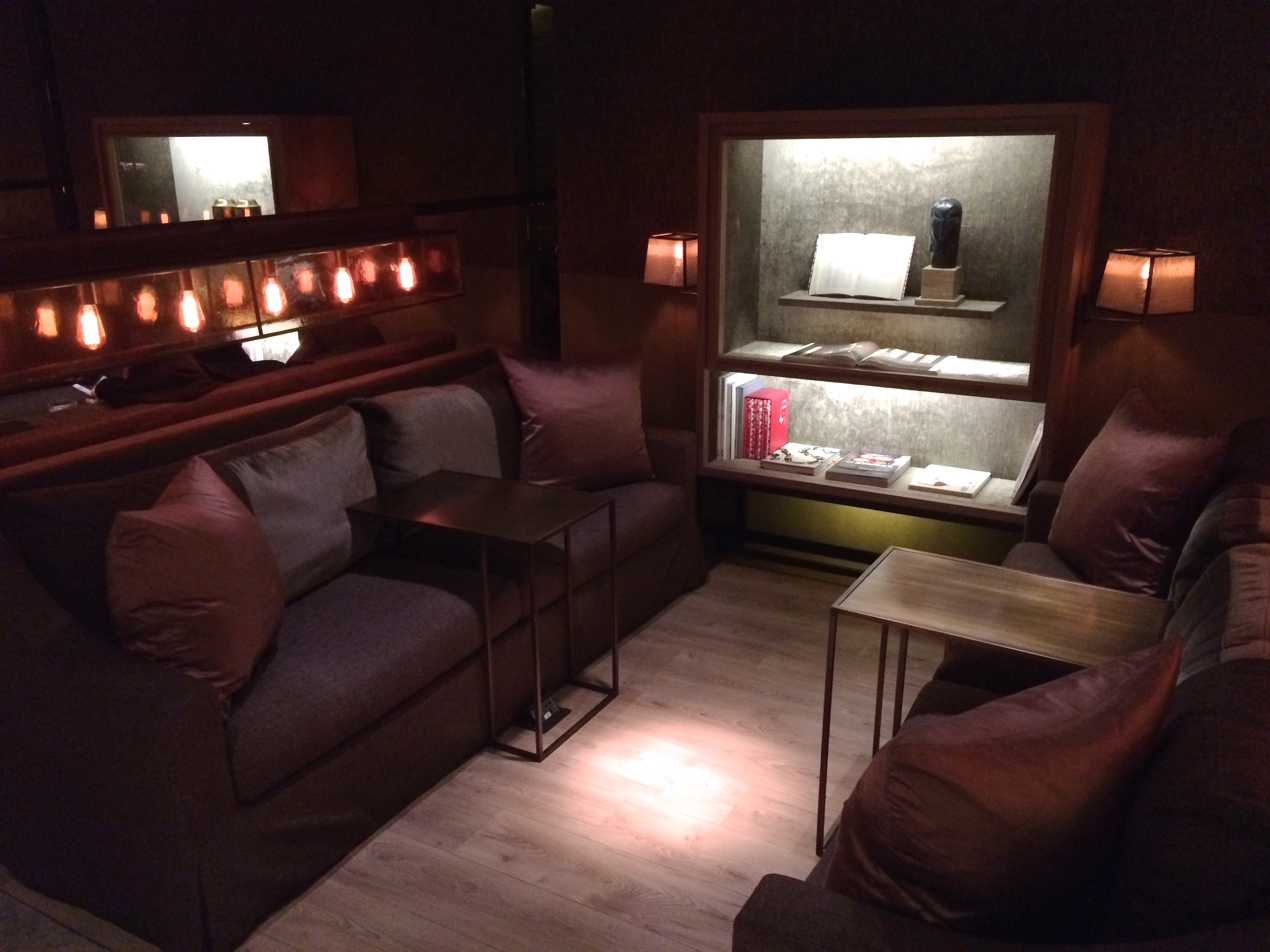
TPE T1 Lounge Business Class Area

China Airlines' airline lounges are branded as "Dynasty Lounge". There are a total of nine China Airlines lounges (including one Mandarin Airlines lounge in Taichung) at seven different airports. Lounge services at other China Airlines destinations are offered by SkyTeam, partner airlines, or local operators. Dynasty Lounge is available to Business Class passengers and Dynasty Flyer Gold, Emerald, and Paragon cardholders. Two-section lounges include an Exclusive Area, for Dynasty Flyer Emerald and Paragon cardholders, and a Business Class Area, for Business Class passengers and Dynasty Flyer Gold cardholders.

Dynasty Lounge features vary by location. Services typically include meals, refreshments, free Wi-Fi access, computers, televisions, publications, shower facilities, and breast-feeding rooms. Sleeping quarters and tea bars are featured at the newly renovated Taiwan Taoyuan International Airport Terminal 1 lounge, which was designed by Taiwanese architect Ray Chen.

Location of Dynasty Lounges:

- Taipei Taoyuan International Airport Terminal 1
- Taipei Taoyuan International Airport Terminal 2 (near Gate D4)
- Taipei Taoyuan International Airport Terminal 2 (previously branded as Dynasty Supreme Lounge)
- Kaohsiung International Airport
- Kuala Lumpur International Airport (Closed)
- Bangkok Suvarnabhumi Airport
- Tokyo Narita International Airport Terminal 2
- Honolulu International Airport
- San Francisco International Airport

==== Skyteam Lounge Hong Kong ====
At Hong Kong International Airport Terminal 1, China Airlines utilises the SkyTeam alliance lounge, in which the carrier, alliance partner China Eastern Airlines, and Plaza Premium Lounge lead the designing, management, and operations. The 1,038 square meters lounge is located near Gate 5 and provides a total of 230 seats.

=== Private bus services in the United States ===
In the United States, China Airlines operates private bus services in selected cities to transport customers between their residing location and the airport.

In Greater New York, the airline operates a bus to John F. Kennedy International Airport from Fort Lee, Parsippany-Troy Hills, and Edison in northern New Jersey, and several points in Greater Philadelphia, including Cherry Hill, New Jersey, North Philadelphia, and South Philadelphia. In Los Angeles, a bus transports customers between Los Angeles International Airport, Monterey Park and Rowland Heights.

Previously, the airline operated buses for travelers in San Francisco, Houston and Abu Dhabi. The San Francisco buses transported customers to and from Milpitas and Cupertino. The Houston bus service served Sugar Land and Southwest Houston Chinatown.

== Subsidiaries and associates ==
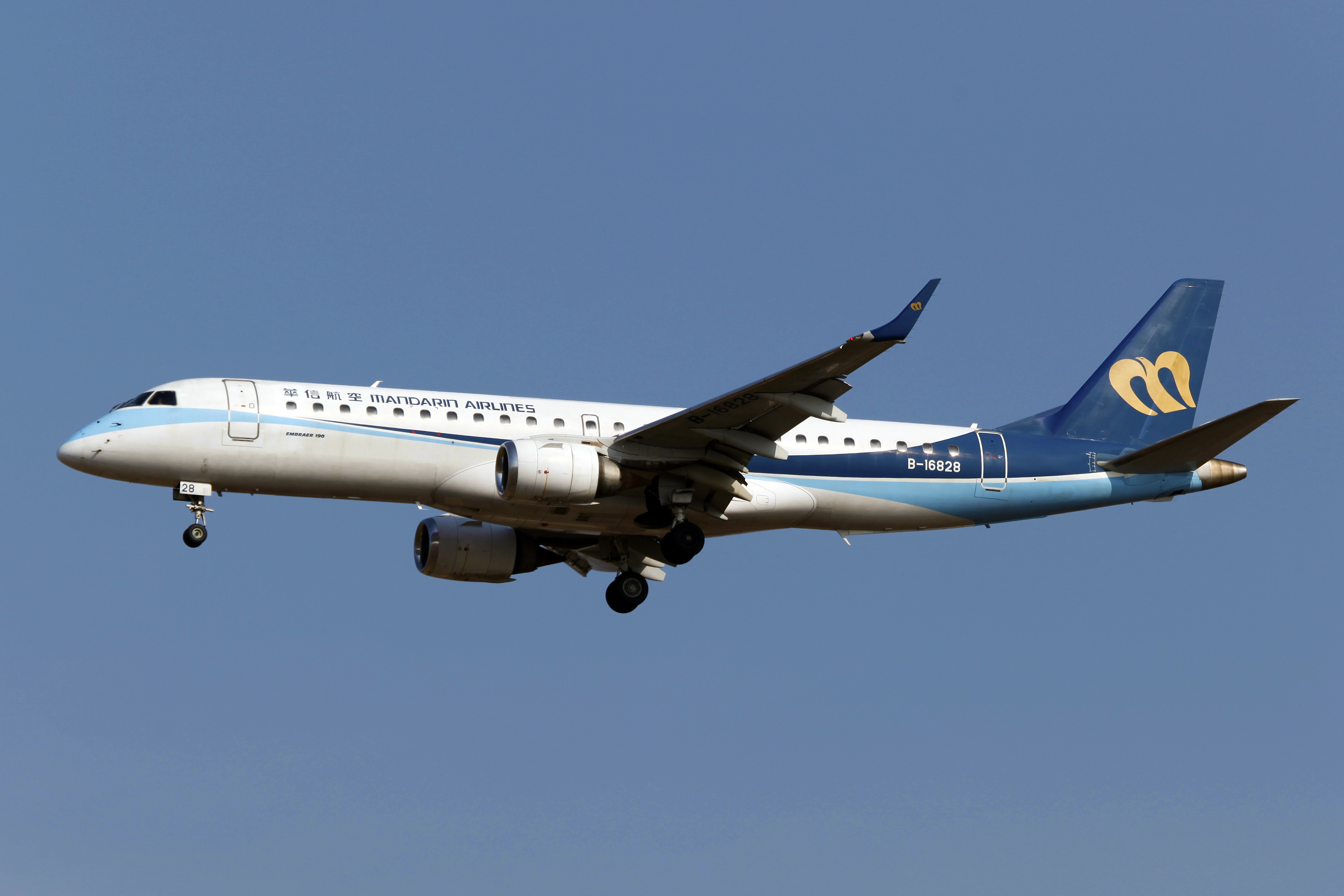
Mandarin Airlines E190

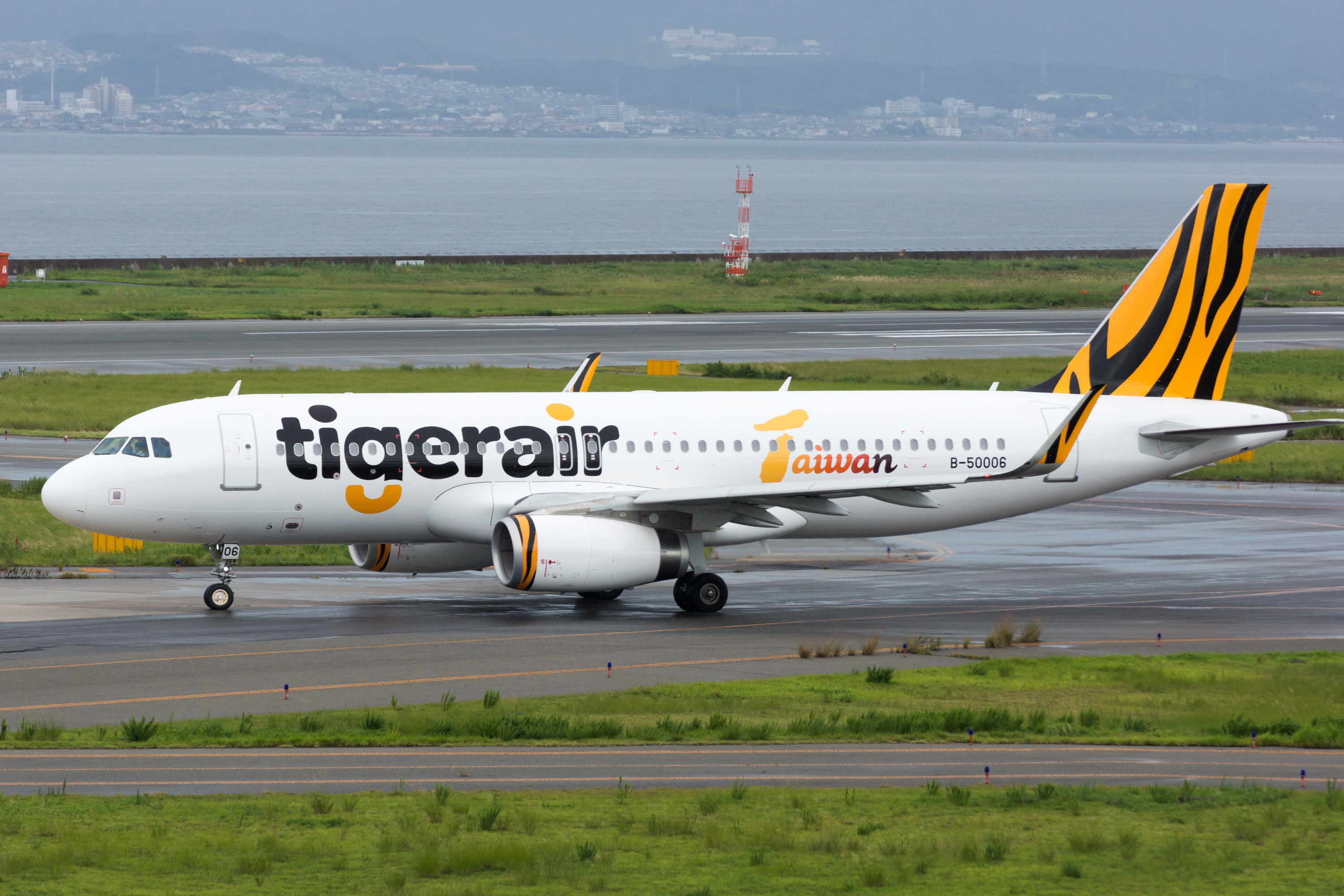
Tigerair Taiwan Airbus A320

China Airlines has diversified into related industries and sectors, including ground handling, aviation engineering, and inflight catering.

In 2022, China Airlines opened a major MRO facility at Taoyuan International Airport in a joint venture with Nordam.

Companies with a major China Airlines Group stake include:

Company	Type	Principal activities	Incorporated in	Group's equity shareholding
Cal-Asia Investment Inc.	Subsidiary	Holding company	British Virgin Islands	100%
CAL Park	Subsidiary	Headquarters	Taiwan	100%
China Aircraft Services Limited	Joint Venture	Maintenance Company	Hong Kong	20%
China Pacific Catering Services Limited	Subsidiary	Catering services	Taiwan	51%
China Pacific Laundry Services Limited	Subsidiary	Laundry	Taiwan	55%
Dynasty Holidays	Subsidiary	Travel agency	Taiwan	51%
Global Sky Express Limited	Joint Venture	Cargo loading	Taiwan	25%
Hwa Hsia Company Limited	Subsidiary	Laundry	Taiwan	100%
Mandarin Airlines	Subsidiary	Regional airline	Taiwan	93.99%
Taiwan Air Cargo Terminals Limited	Subsidiary	Cargo loading	Taiwan	54%
Taiwan Aircraft Maintenance & Engineering Co. (TAMECO)	Subsidiary	MRO company	Taiwan	100%
Taoyuan International Airport Services Limited	Subsidiary	Ground handling	Taiwan	49%
Tigerair Taiwan	Subsidiary	Low-cost carrier	Taiwan	100%

== Incidents and accidents ==
Between 1994 and 2002, China Airlines suffered four fatal accidents, three of which each resulted in more than 200 deaths. The accidents contributed to the perception of the airline having a poor reputation for safety. Since then, the airline's safety record has seen an improvement. In 2007, in an article published after the explosion of Flight 120, The Wall Street Journal quoted analysts as saying the airline has had "a marked improvement in safety and operational performance since 2002", with the mid-air disintegration of Flight 611 being "a catalyst for an overhaul" in its safety practices.

=== 1969 ===
- January 2: Flight 227, operated by a Douglas C-47A (B-309), struck the side of Mount Dawu (大武山, elevation 3090 m), Taiwan after encountering turbulence and a downdraft. The aircraft was operating a domestic scheduled passenger flight from Taitung Airport to Kaohsiung International Airport. All 24 passengers and crew were killed.

=== 1970s ===
- August 12, 1970: Flight 206, operated by a NAMC YS-11A (B-156), struck a ridge in thick fog while on approach to Taipei, killing 14 of 31 on board.
- November 20, 1971: Flight 825, operated by a Sud Aviation Caravelle III (B-1852), blew up after a bomb on board exploded, causing the deaths of 25 people over the Penghu Islands.
- March 26, 1975: Douglas C-47A (B-1553) crashed at Kompong Som following a mid-air collision with a Cessna L-19 Bird Dog.
- March 9, 1978: China Airlines Flight 831, operated by a Boeing 737 (B-1870) was hijacked at Hong Kong, the aircraft landed safely at Kai Tak Airport where the hijacker was killed, the aircraft was also later involved in China Airlines Flight 2265.
- September 11, 1979: Boeing 707-320C (B-1834), crashed shortly after take-off from Chiang Kai-shek International Airport during a training flight, killing all six crew on board.

=== 1980s ===
- February 7, 1980: China Airlines Flight 009, operated by a Boeing 747-200B (B-18255), suffered a tailstrike while landing at Kai Tak Airport. The plane was ferried unpressurized back to Taiwan to be repaired on the same day. The aircraft involved in the incident would later suffer a mid-air breakup 22 years later, in 2002, while flying as China Airlines Flight 611, due to faulty repair work following the tailstrike, which caused metal fatigue following repeated cycles of pressurisation and depressurisation during flights.
- February 27, 1980: China Airlines Flight 811, operated by a Boeing 707-309C (B-1826), crashed short of the runway at Manila International Airport, killing two of 135 on board. The same route with the same flight number was the scene of an assassination of a Filipino politician three years later.
- August 21, 1983: China Airlines Flight 811, operated by a Boeing 767-200 (B-1836) from Taipei, landed in Manila International Airport. A passenger on board the flight, Philippine opposition senator Ninoy Aquino, was returning from a self-imposed exile in the United States, only to be assassinated after being escorted from the aircraft.
- February 19, 1985: Flight 006, operated by a Boeing 747SP (N4522V), performed an uncontrolled descent over the Pacific Ocean, resulting in substantial damage to the aircraft.
- February 16, 1986: Flight 2265, operated by a Boeing 737-200 (B-1870), crashed 19.3 km (12.0 mi; 10.4 nmi) off Magong, Penghu, killing 13. During landing, a nose-wheel tire blew. The crew performed a go-around during which the aircraft crashed; the wreckage was located on March 10 in 190 feet of water.
- May 3, 1986: Flight 334, operated by a Boeing 747-200F (B-198), was hijacked by its pilot, who landed the aircraft in Guangzhou, where he defected. The ROC government sent a delegation to discuss with their mainland counterpart regarding the return of the aircraft and two remaining crew. The same aircraft crashed in 1991.
- October 26, 1989: Flight 204, operated by a Boeing 737-200 (B-180), struck a mountain near Hualien, Taiwan after the crew used the climb out procedure for a different runway, causing the aircraft to make a wrong turn. All 54 passengers and crew aboard were killed.

=== 1990s ===
- December 29, 1991: Flight 358, operated by a Boeing 747-200F (B-198, the same aircraft that was involved in the Flight 334 hijacking), hit a hillside near Wanli, Taiwan after separation of its No. 3 & 4 engines, killing all five crew on board.
- December 7, 1992: Flight 012, operated by a McDonnell Douglas MD-11 (B-150, which then crashed as Flight 642), suffered altitude loss due to turbulence at 33,000 feet near the town of Kushimoto, Japan. The aircraft recovered from the fall and continued to Anchorage, landing there uneventfully despite the loss of its control elevators, which had been ripped off during the incident.
- November 4, 1993: Flight 605, operated by a recently delivered Boeing 747-400 (B-165), overran Kai Tak Airport runway 13 while landing during a typhoon. It had touched down more than 2/3 down the runway and was unable to stop before the end of the runway, ending up in the Victoria Harbour. All 396 people on board were safely evacuated but the aircraft was written off. The vertical stabilizer was explosively removed to prevent interference with Kai Tak's Instrument Landing System (ILS).
- April 26, 1994: Flight 140, operated by an Airbus A300 (B-1816), crashed while landing at Nagoya, Japan due to crew error, killing 264 of 271 on board.
- February 16, 1998: Flight 676, an Airbus A300 crashed in a residential neighborhood in Taipei, Taiwan after requesting a go-around, killing all 196 people on board and six on the ground.
- August 22, 1999: Flight 642, operated by a McDonnell Douglas MD-11 (B-150), flipped over while attempting to land at Hong Kong International Airport (Chek Lap Kok) during a typhoon. Three people were killed.

=== 2000s ===
- May 25, 2002: Flight 611, operated by a Boeing 747-200B (B-18255), broke apart in mid-air on the way to Chek Lap Kok International Airport in Hong Kong from Chiang Kai-shek International Airport in Taiwan. All 206 passengers and 19 crew members died. The aircraft was the last B747-200 in the airline's passenger fleet, which was to be sold to Orient Thai Airlines after its return flight from Hong Kong. The cause was improper repair after a 1980 tail-strike incident in Hong Kong's Kai Tak Airport.
- August 20, 2007: Flight 120, operated by a Boeing 737-800 (B-18616) inbound from Taipei, caught fire shortly after landing at Naha Airport in Okinawa Prefecture, Japan. After stopping on the runway, the engine started smoking and burning, later exploding and causing the aircraft to catch fire. All passengers and crew were evacuated without serious injury; a ground engineer knocked over by the blast was unhurt. The aircraft was damaged beyond economical repair. The cause of the fire was attributed to a fuel tank puncture from a loose right wing slat bolt.

=== 2020s ===
- January 28, 2022: Flight 5240, operated by a Boeing 747-400F (B-18715), sustained damage to its number 2 engine after skidding on the snow-covered ground and colliding with ground equipment at O'Hare International Airport.

== See also ==
- List of airlines of Taiwan
- List of companies of Taiwan
- List of airports in Taiwan
- Transportation in Taiwan
- Air transport in Taiwan
