= Deaths in October 2005 =

The following is a list of notable deaths in October 2005.

Entries for each day are listed alphabetically by surname. A typical entry lists information in the following sequence:

- Name, age, country of citizenship at birth, subsequent country of citizenship (if applicable), reason for notability, cause of death (if known), and reference.

== October 2005 ==
=== 1 ===
- Román Torán Albero, 73, Spanish chess player.
- David Frederick Case, 73, British audiobook narrator, throat cancer.
- Bruce Chamberlain, 66, Australian politician.
- Tom Clyde, 82, American baseball player (Philadelphia Athletics).
- Robert Hanson, 85, American aviator, last-surviving crew-member of the "Memphis Belle".
- Peter Hubbard-Miles, 78, British politician.
- Herbert Huber, 74, German botanist.
- Paul Pena, 55, American blues guitarist and songwriter, complications of diabetes and pancreatitis.

=== 2 ===
- Bud Black, 73, American baseball player (Detroit Tigers).
- Hamilton Camp, 70, British-American singer and actor (Heaven Can Wait, The Smurfs, DuckTales), heart attack.
- Pat Kelly, 61, American former Major League Baseball All-Star, heart attack.
- George Pargeter, 82, Canadian ice hockey player (Montreal Canadiens).
- Nipsey Russell, 80, American comedian, poet and actor, cancer.
- August Wilson, 60, American playwright (Fences, Ma Rainey's Black Bottom, The Piano Lesson), liver cancer.

=== 3 ===
- Erdal Barkay, 77, Turkish Olympic athlete (1948, 1952).
- Ronnie Barker, 76, British actor and writer (The Two Ronnies, Porridge, Open All Hours), heart failure.
- Seymour Boardman, 83, American artist.
- Emilinha Borba, 82, Brazilian singer and actress, heart attack.
- Betty Bryant, 85, British-Australian actress.
- Alastair G. W. Cameron, 80, Canadian-American astrophysicist and pioneer on Stellar nucleosynthesis, heart failure.
- David Cohen, 90, American politician, heart failure.
- Guillaume Dustan, 39, French writer, pulmonary embolism.
- Mario Encarnación, 30, Dominican baseball player (Colorado Rockies, Chicago Cubs).
- Nurettin Ersin, 86–87, Turkish army general.
- Henry Howard, 75, American politician, member of the Georgia House of Representatives.
- Chintamoni Kar, 90, British-Indian sculptor.
- Sara Levi-Tanai, 95, Israeli choreographer and song writer.
- André Riou, 87, French football player.
- Alfredo Rodríguez, 68, Cuban pianist from the 1960s to 2000s.
- Milton Lewis Schwartz, 85, American district judge (United States District Court for the Eastern District of California).
- Franco Scoglio, 64, Italian soccer trainer, heart attack.
- Roy Sleap, 65, English footballer and Olympian (1960).
- Bolesław Szadkowski, 60, Polish footballer.
- Alvin Wistert, 89, American gridiron football player (Michigan Wolverines).
- Jeff Young, 63, Welsh rugby union player, Alzheimer's disease.

=== 4 ===
- Don Arioli, 69, American-Canadian actor and writer.
- John Falloon, 63, New Zealand politician, former New Zealand Cabinet minister, brain cancer.
- Mike Gibbins, 56, Welsh drummer (Badfinger), intracranial aneurysm.
- Stanley K. Hathaway, 81, American politician, Governor of Wyoming, (1967–1975), Secretary of the Interior (1975).
- Vakhtang Jordania, 62, Soviet and Georgian conductor, cancer.
- Harold Leventhal, 86, American folk music promoter.
- Lester Lockett, 93, American baseball player.
- Witold Majewski, 75, Polish footballer.
- Ronald Rivlin, 90, British-American physicist, mathematician, rheologist.
- William J. Ruane, 79, American philanthropist and financier, lung cancer.
- André Waterkeyn, 88, Belgian engineer and Olympic field hockey player (1948).
- Richard Zobel, 53, American actor, cancer.

=== 5 ===
- Álvaro Domecq y Díez, 88, Spanish aristocrat.
- Shirley Ellis, 76, American soul music singer and songwriter.
- Horst Floth, 71, West German bobsledder and Olympic silver medalist (1968, 1972), cancer.
- George S. Hammond, 84, American scientist and theoretical chemist.
- Leopold Horner, 94, German chemist.
- John van Hengel, 83, American entrepreneur and food bank pioneer, Parkinson's disease.

=== 6 ===
- Warren Benson, 81, American composer.
- Harry Bugin, 76, American actor (Barton Fink, The Big Lebowski, The Hudsucker Proxy).
- Ray Bumatai, 52, American comedian and actor (Rocket Power), brain cancer.
- Ettore Cunial, 99, Italian prelate, world's oldest Roman Catholic bishop.
- Louise Gore, 80, American Republican politician, cancer.
- Marta Grandi, 90, Italian entomologist.
- Egil Solsvik, 89, Norwegian wrestler and Olympian (1948).
- John V. Wehausen, 92, American applied mathematician.

=== 7 ===
- Devery Freeman, 92, American screenwriter, novelist, television producer, and union activist.
- Roger A. Freeman, 77, British military aviation historian.
- Richard Stone Reeves, 85, American equestrian portraitist.
- Charles Rocket, 56, American actor and comedian (Saturday Night Live, Dumb and Dumber, Hocus Pocus), suicide.
- Jovan Soldatović, 84, Serbian and Yugoslav sculptor.
- Michael Ward, 80, English surgeon and an expedition doctor on the 1953 first ascent of Mount Everest with Sir Edmund Hillary.

=== 8 ===
- Tin Dekkers, 89, Dutch Olympic boxer (1936).
- Sonny Fisher, 73, American singer, songwriter, and guitarist.
- Alfred Goldie, 84, English mathematician.
- Erik Grønseth, 80, Norwegian sociologist.
- George Hislop, 78, Canadian gay activist, Parkinson's disease.
- Swede Larsen, 91, American baseball player (Boston Bees).
- Juan Malo, 83, Spanish Olympic sports shooter (1960).
- Harry Pitt, 91, British mathematician.
- Micaela Portilla, 83, Spanish anthropologist and historian.

=== 9 ===
- Clóvis Bornay, 89, Brazilian carnival designer and museum curator, heart attack.
- Sergio Cervato, 76, Italian football player.
- Tom Cheek, 66, American sportscaster, longtime Toronto Blue Jays announcer, brain cancer.
- Serge Lancel, 77, French archaeologist, historian and philologist.
- Madurai N. Krishnan, 76, Indian musician.
- Billy Myles, 81, American R&B songwriter and singer.
- Louis Nye, 92, American comedian, lung cancer.
- Zora Singh, 77, Indian Olympic racewalker (1960).

=== 10 ===
- Angelo Argea, 75, Greek longtime caddy for legendary golfer Jack Nicklaus, liver cancer.
- Wayne C. Booth, 84, American professor, literary critic, and rhetorician, complications of dementia.
- Per Frantzen, 85, Norwegian footballer.
- Nick Hawkins, 40, English guitarist (Big Audio Dynamite), heart attack.
- Tomislav Krizmanić, 76, Croatian Olympic boxer (1952).
- Roland Kuhn, 93, Swiss psychiatrist.
- Gerd Lauck, 74, German footballer.
- Gene Lenz, 68, American swimmer and Olympian (1960).
- Apollo Milton Obote, 79, Ugandan political leader, president (1980-1985), kidney failure.
- Zecharia Ratzabi, 71, Israeli footballer.
- Attilâ İlhan, 80, Turkish poet and writer, heart attack.

=== 11 ===
- Sergio Citti, 72, Italian screenwriter and film director, heart attack.
- Shan-ul-Haq Haqqee, 87, Pakistani Urdu poet, writer, journalist, broadcaster, and lexicographer.
- Oscar Hold, 86, English football player and manager, bladder cancer.
- Jan Holden, 74, British actress (The Cheaters).
- Joseph Neri, 91, French cyclist.
- Arthur Seldon, 89, British libertarian economist.
- Edward Szczepanik, 90, Polish economist and last Prime Minister of the Polish Government in Exile.
- Cor Veldhoen, 66, Dutch soccer player (Feyenoord and national team).
- Aloysius John Wycislo, 97, American prelate, Bishop Emeritus of Green Bay, Wisconsin.

=== 12 ===
- Zhang Bairen, 90, Chinese underground Roman Catholic bishop, heart disease.
- Robert Sidney Foster, 91, British colonial officer (Governor of Fiji).
- Frank Galbally, 82, Australian lawyer.
- Erwin Graf, 88, American basketball player.
- Ghazi Kanaan, 63, Syrian politician and Interior Minister, suicide by gunshot.
- Baker Knight, 72, American songwriter ("Lonesome Town").
- Franco Manfroi, 66, Italian cross-country skier and Olympian (1964, 1968).
- Mike Naymick, 88, American baseball player (Cleveland Indians, St. Louis Cardinals).
- C. Delores Tucker, 78, American politician and civil rights activist.
- Jack White, 63, American reporter.

=== 13 ===
- Eevald Äärma, 93, Estonian pole vaulter and Olympian (1936).
- Mustapha Bettache, 74, Moroccan football player.
- Emile Capouya, 80, American publisher, author, and literary critic.
- István Eörsi, 74, Hungarian left-wing intellectual, leukemia.
- Vivian Malone Jones, 63, American civil rights pioneer, stroke.
- Theda Marshall, 81, American baseball player.
- Israel Sánchez, 76, Cuban Olympic wrestler (1948).
- Volker Tulzer, 65, Austrian Olympic middle-distance runner (1964).
- Wayne Weiler, 70, American racecar driver, heart attack.
- Marian Zieliński, 75, Polish weightlifter and Olympic medalist (1956, 1960, 1964, 1968).

=== 14 ===
- Edmund Bacon, 95, American urban planner.
- Ian Breakwell, 62, British artist, cancer.
- Winifred Mary Curtis, 100, British-Australian botanist, author, and researcher.
- Oleg Lundstrem, 89, Russian jazz musician.
- Louis Polonia, 70, French footballer and Olympian (1960).
- Elda Pucci, 77, Italian politician and professor.

=== 15 ===
- Leo Bogart, 84, American sociologist, babesiosis.
- Giuseppe Caprio, 90, Italian cardinal of the Roman Catholic Church.
- Jason Collier, 28, American basketball player (Houston Rockets, Atlanta Hawks), heart arrhythmia.
- Earl Gardner, 82, American basketball player (Minneapolis Lakers).
- Ramón Gaya, 95, Spanish painter and writer.
- Penn Kemble, 64, American political activist, brain cancer.
- Alfred Obschernikat, 79, German Olympic water polo player (1956).
- Louis Pojman, 70, American philosopher and professor.
- Sundara Ramaswamy, 74, Indian novelist, poet, translator, and literary critic.
- Don Rowe, 69, American baseball player (New York Mets), and pitching coach, Parkinson's disease.
- Mildred Shay, 94, American actress.
- Raymond Tuckey, 95, English tennis player.
- Rik Van Nutter, 76, American actor, heart attack.
- Al Widmar, 80, American MLB pitcher and pitching coach, colon cancer.
- Matti Wuori, 60, Finnish advocate and politician, cancer.

=== 16 ===
- Jean Bastia, 86, French film director, screenwriter and film producer.
- Jack Carpenter, 82, American football player (Buffalo Bills, San Francisco 49ers).
- Elmer Dresslar Jr., 80, American voice actor and vocalist, voice of the Jolly Green Giant, cancer.
- Francesco Fortugno, 54, Italian politician, homicide.
- Ursula Howells, 83, British character actress (The Forsyte Saga).
- Alvin M. Josephy, Jr., 90, American history professor, expert on native american history.
- John Larch, 91, American character actor.
- José María Medina, 84, Uruguayan football player.
- Barrington Moore, Jr., 92, American sociologist.
- Børge Mortensen, 83, Danish Olympic cyclist (1948).
- David Reilly, 34, American musician (God Lives Underwater), accidental death.

=== 17 ===
- Alfonso Bortolotti, 93, Italian sculptor.
- Tom Gill, 92, American comic book artist (The Lone Ranger).
- Ba Jin, 100, Chinese writer, cancer and Parkinson's disease.
- Jean Lescure, 93, French poet.
- Antal Moldrich, 71, Hungarian Olympic modern pentathlete (1956).
- Donald Kofi Tucker, 67, American civil rights activist, complications of diabetes.

=== 18 ===
- William Evan Allan, 106, Australian soldier, last Australian World War I veteran.
- Carlos António Gomes, 73, Portuguese goalkeeper with Sporting Lisbon and Portugal's national team, Parkinson's disease.
- Johnny Haynes, 71, English footballer, car accident.
- John Hollis, 77, British actor of TV and film.
- Stephen Katz, 59, American teacher and screenwriter, prostate cancer.
- Bill King, 78, American sports broadcaster, pulmonary embolism.
- Heini Nettesheim, 89, German Olympic wrestler (1936, 1952).
- Alexander Yakovlev, 81, Russian politician and architect of perestroika, stroke.

=== 19 ===
- Bob Carpenter, 87, American baseball player (New York Giants, Chicago Cubs).
- Jim Morgan, 62, Australian rugby league footballer.
- Ron Mrozinski, 75, American baseball player (Philadelphia Phillies).
- Wolf Rilla, 85, German-British film director and writer.
- Luis Adolfo Siles Salinas, 80, Bolivian politician, President (1969), heart attack.
- Nguyen Van Toan, 73, South Vietnamese Lieutenant general in the ARVN.

=== 20 ===
- Dan Anca, 58, Romanian footballer and manager.
- Jean-Michel Folon, 71, Belgian artist, leukemia.
- Michael Gill, 81, British television producer, Alzheimer's disease.
- Chalmers Goodlin, 82, American test pilot (Bell X-1 supersonic rocket plane).
- Shirley Horn, 71, American jazz singer, complications of diabetes.
- André van der Louw, 72, Dutch politician, cancer.
- Otto Luedeke, 89, American Olympic cyclist (1932).
- Endon Mahmood, 64, Malaysian Prime Minister's wife, breast cancer.
- Stanley Prince, 78, British footballer and Olympian (1956).
- Willie Sojourner, 57, American basketball player (Virginia Squires, New York Nets), traffic collision.
- Dane Zajc, 75, Slovenian poet, playwright, and writer, cancer.
- Eva Švankmajerová, 65, Czech surrealistic painter.

=== 21 ===
- Karin Adelmund, 56, Dutch politician, heart attack.
- Robert Badham, 76, American politician, Republican US Representative from California, heart attack.
- Marshall Clagett, 89, American historian of science, professor emeritus at the Institute for Advanced Study at Princeton.
- Tara Correa-McMullen, 16, American actress, gunshot wound.
- Robert Gentleman, 82, British Olympic water polo player (1948).
- Oscar Giacché, 82, Argentine Olympic cyclist (1948, 1952).
- John Lesinski, Jr., 90, American politician, U.S. Representative from Michigan (1951–1965).
- Herman N. Neuberger, 87, German-American rabbi.
- Lou Rossini, 84, American former basketball coach of New York University, Alzheimer's disease.
- Doris Storey, 85, English breaststroke swimmer and Olympian (1936).

=== 22 ===
- Tony Adams, 53, Irish-American film and stage producer (The Pink Panther) (Victor Victoria), stroke.
- Arman, 76, French-American sculptor, cancer.
- Ted Bonda, 88, American former owner of the Cleveland Indians baseball team, Alzheimer's disease.
- David Clapham, 74, South African racing driver and motor sport journalist.
- Franky Gee, 43, Cuban-American musician and lead singer of Captain Jack, cerebral haemorrhage.
- Liam Lawlor, 61, Irish Fianna Fáil Teachta Dála (TD), car accident.
- Reginald Lisowski, 79, American professional wrestler known as "The Crusher", brain tumor.
- Cheick Oumar Diarra, 61, Malian general, deputy executive secretary of ECOWAS, plane crash.

=== 23 ===
- Harry Dalton, 77, American Major League Baseball executive, Parkinson's disease.
- William Hootkins, 57, American actor (Star Wars, Batman, Raiders of the Lost Ark), pancreatic cancer.
- Yon Hyong-muk, 73, North Korean politician, Premier (1988-1992), pancreatic cancer.
- Nils Lundh, 84, Swedish Olympic ski jumper (1948).
- John S. Monagan, 93, American politician, US Representative from Connecticut (1959-1973), heart failure.
- John Muth, 75, American economist.
- Reginald R. Myers, 85, United States Marine Corps officer and recipient of the Medal of Honor.
- Stella Obasanjo, 59, Nigerian First Lady, wife of president Olusegun Obasanjo, complications from surgery.
- Jaime del Burgo Torres, 92, Spanish official, writer and a Carlist activist.
- Ahmet Özacar, 68, Turkish football player.

=== 24 ===
- Ricardo Brinzoni, 60, Argentine army Lieutenant General, pancreatic cancer.
- Howie Carl, 67, American basketball player (DePaul Blue Demons, Chicago Packers).
- José Azcona del Hoyo, 78, Honduran politician, President of Honduras (1986–1990), heart attack.
- Mokarrameh Ghanbari, 77, Iranian painter.
- Immanuel C.Y. Hsü, 82, American sinologist, historian, and acamdemic.
- Jun Negami, 82, Japanese actor.
- Rosa Parks, 92, American civil rights pioneer, "founding symbol of the Civil Rights Movement".
- Edward Ross Roybal, 89, Mexican-American US Representative from California, pneumonia.
- Robert Sloman, 79, English screenwriter and actor.
- Maria Luise Thurmair-Mumelter, 93, German Roman Catholic theologian, hymnodist and writer.
- Frank Wilson, 81, Australian actor, singer, TV celebrity, diabetes.

=== 25 ===
- Zarina Baloch, 70, Pakistani folk singer.
- Jesse E. Eschbach, 84, American federal judge.
- Oswald Hanfling, 77, German philosopher.
- Enid A. Haupt, 99, American publisher and philanthropist.
- Martti Huhtala, 86, Finnish Nordic combined athlete and Olympic silver medalist (1948).
- Barbara Keogh, 76, British actress.
- Wellington Mara, 89, American gridiron football executive, lymphoma.
- Morteza Momayez, 69, Iranian graphic designer.
- Margarita Nazarova, 78, Russian circus performer, tiger trainer and actress, heart attack.
- Henryk Pielesiak, 50, Polish Olympic boxer (1980).
- Nirmal Verma, 76, Indian author and literary critic, heart attack.

=== 26 ===
- Carlo Giustini, 82, Italian actor.
- Jany Holt, 96, Romanian-French actress.
- Michael Kilian, 66, American author and comics writer (Dick Tracy), liver failure.
- Emil Kyulev, 48, Bulgarian millionaire banker and suspected money launderer, murdered.
- Keith Parkinson, 47, American fantasy and science fiction artist and illustrator, leukemia.
- María Luisa Robledo, 93, Spanish film and television actress.
- Richard Southwood, 74, British biologist, cancer.
- George Swindin, 90, English football goalkeeper and manager (Arsenal and Cardiff City), Alzheimer's disease.
- David Townsend, 50, American musician.
- Rong Yiren, 89, Chinese politician, Vice President of China (1993-1998).

=== 27 ===
- Jozef Bomba, 66, Slovak footballer.
- Georges Guingouin, 92, French Communist Party militant and resistance leader during World War II.
- Kurt Jarasinski, 66, German Olympic equestrian gold medalist (1964).
- Jun Papa, 60, Filipino basketball player and Olympian (1968, 1972).
- Grady Webster, 78, American plant systematist and taxonomist, heart attack.

=== 28 ===
- Henry Adams, 89, American football player (Pittsburgh Panthers, Chicago Cardinals).
- Adhemar Bianchini, 65, Brazilian footballer.
- Eugene K. Bird, 79, American longtime Spandau prison guard of Rudolf Hess.
- Bob Broeg, 87, American Hall of Fame baseball sports writer, pneumonia.
- Boris Goykhman, 86, Soviet Olympic water polo player (1952, 1956, 1960).
- Raymond Hains, 78, French artist.
- Tony Jackson, 62, American basketball player, cancer.
- Adel Ibrahim Moustafa, 75, Egyptian Olympic wrestler (1948, 1952).
- Alberto Ormaetxea, 66, Spanish football player and coach.
- Fernando Quejas, 83, Cape Verdean singer and musician.
- Paul Reynard, 78, French-American painter, lung cancer.
- Richard Smalley, 62, American Nobel Prize-winning chemist, co-discoverer of fullerenes, leukemia.
- Ljuba Tadić, 76, Serbian actor.
- Tahsin Özgüç, 89, Turkish archaeologist.

=== 29 ===
- Fernando Alegría, 87, Chilean poet, kidney failure.
- H. K. L. Bhagat, 84, Indian politician.
- Lloyd Bochner, 81, Canadian actor (Dynasty, Point Blank, Batman: The Animated Series), cancer.
- Mor Julius Yeshu Cicek, 63, Turkish prelate, highest-ranking Syriac Orthodox Church priest in Europe.
- Ion Irimescu, 102, Romanian sculptor and sketcher.
- Valery Kokov, 64, Russian politician, former President of Kabardino-Balkaria, cancer.
- Sergey Savelyev, 57, Russian cross-country skier and Olympic champion (1976, 1980).
- Elsa Skjerven, 85, American politician.
- Joan Kennedy Taylor, 78, American journalist, author, and political activist.
- Elizabeth Wilde, 92, American Olympic sprinter (1932).

=== 30 ===
- Bob Allen, 91, American baseball player (Philadelphia Phillies).
- Gordon A. Craig, 91, American historian, congestive heart failure.
- Doris Eckert, 90, German Olympic hurdler (1936).
- John N. Erlenborn, 78, American lawyer and U.S. Representative from Illinois, Lewy body disease.
- Tetsuo Hamuro, 88, Japanese breaststroke swimmer and Olympic gold medalist (1936).
- Johan von Koss, 83, Norwegian Olympic fencer (1948, 1952).
- Al Lopez, 97, American baseball manager (Chicago White Sox) and member of the Baseball Hall of Fame.
- Joseph Owens, 97, Canadian Roman Catholic priest and philosopher.
- Horace Trevor-Cox, 97, British farmer, landowner and politician.
- Emiliano Zuleta, 93, Colombian vallenato musician, respiratory disease.

=== 31 ===
- Hal Anger, 85, American biophysicist, pioneer of nuclear medicine.
- William O. Baker, 90, American scientist and former Bell Labs president, respiratory failure.
- Evert Hingst, 35, Dutch lawyer, allegedly involved in organized crime, shot.
- P. Leela, 72, Indian film playback singer.
- Åke Nilsson, 67, Swedish Olympic canoeist (1960).
- Amrita Pritam, 86, Indian poet and writer.
- Mary Wimbush, 81, British actress (The Archers), stroke.
