= Bellview =

Bellview or Belview can refer to:

== Places ==
=== United States ===
- Bellview, Florida, a census-designated place
- Bellview, Georgia, an unincorporated community
- Belview, Minnesota, a city
- Bellview, New Jersey, an unincorporated community
- Bellview, New Mexico, an unincorporated community
- Bellview, North Carolina, an unincorporated community

=== Ireland ===
- Belview, County Westmeath, Ireland - see List of townlands of County Meath
- Belview Port

== Businesses ==
- Bellview Airlines, a Nigerian airline which operated from 1992 to 2009
- Bellview Airlines (Sierra Leone), which operated from 1995 until its license was revoked in 2008
- Bellview Winery, a winery in Atlantic County, New Jersey

== Other uses ==
- Bellview School, near Pikeville, Tennessee, United States, a former rural schoolhouse, on the National Register of Historic Places

== See also ==
- Bellevue (disambiguation)
