= Bellview Airlines Flight 210 =

2005 aviation accident

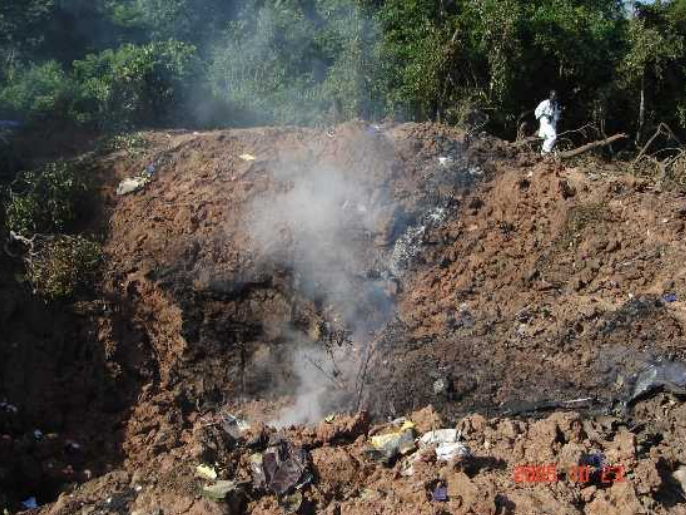
- The crater left by the aircraft

Accident
- Date: 22 October 2005
- Summary: Crashed shortly after takeoff, cause undetermined
- Site: Lisa Village, Ogun State, Nigeria; 6°48′43″N 3°18′19″E

Aircraft
- The aircraft involved in the accident, pictured while still in operation with Halisa Air in 1996
- Aircraft type: Boeing 737-2L9
- Aircraft name: Resilience
- Operator: Bellview Airlines
- IATA flight No.: B3210
- ICAO flight No.: BLV210
- Call sign: Bellview 210
- Registration: 5N-BFN
- Flight origin: Murtala Muhammed International Airport, Lagos, Nigeria
- Destination: Nnamdi Azikiwe International Airport, Abuja, Nigeria
- Occupants: 117
- Passengers: 111
- Crew: 6
- Fatalities: 117
- Survivors: 0

Bellview Airlines Flight 210 was a scheduled Nigerian domestic passenger flight of a Boeing 737-200 airliner from Lagos to Abuja, operated by Lagos-based Bellview Airlines. On 22 October 2005, the aircraft nose-dived and crashed at high speed a few minutes after takeoff, killing all 117 people on board.

The investigation of the crash was hampered by the lack of physical evidence on the crash site, which was caused by the aircraft's high speed during impact and by looting afterward. The flight recorders were not recovered, and forensic analysis of the pilots could not be conducted. As a result, the investigation was not able to conclude the cause of the crash.

The crash of Flight 210 was followed by the crashes of Sosoliso Airlines Flight 1145 in 2005 and ADC Airlines Flight 053 in 2006. In response, then-president Olusegun Obasanjo vowed to overhaul the aviation sector.

== Background ==
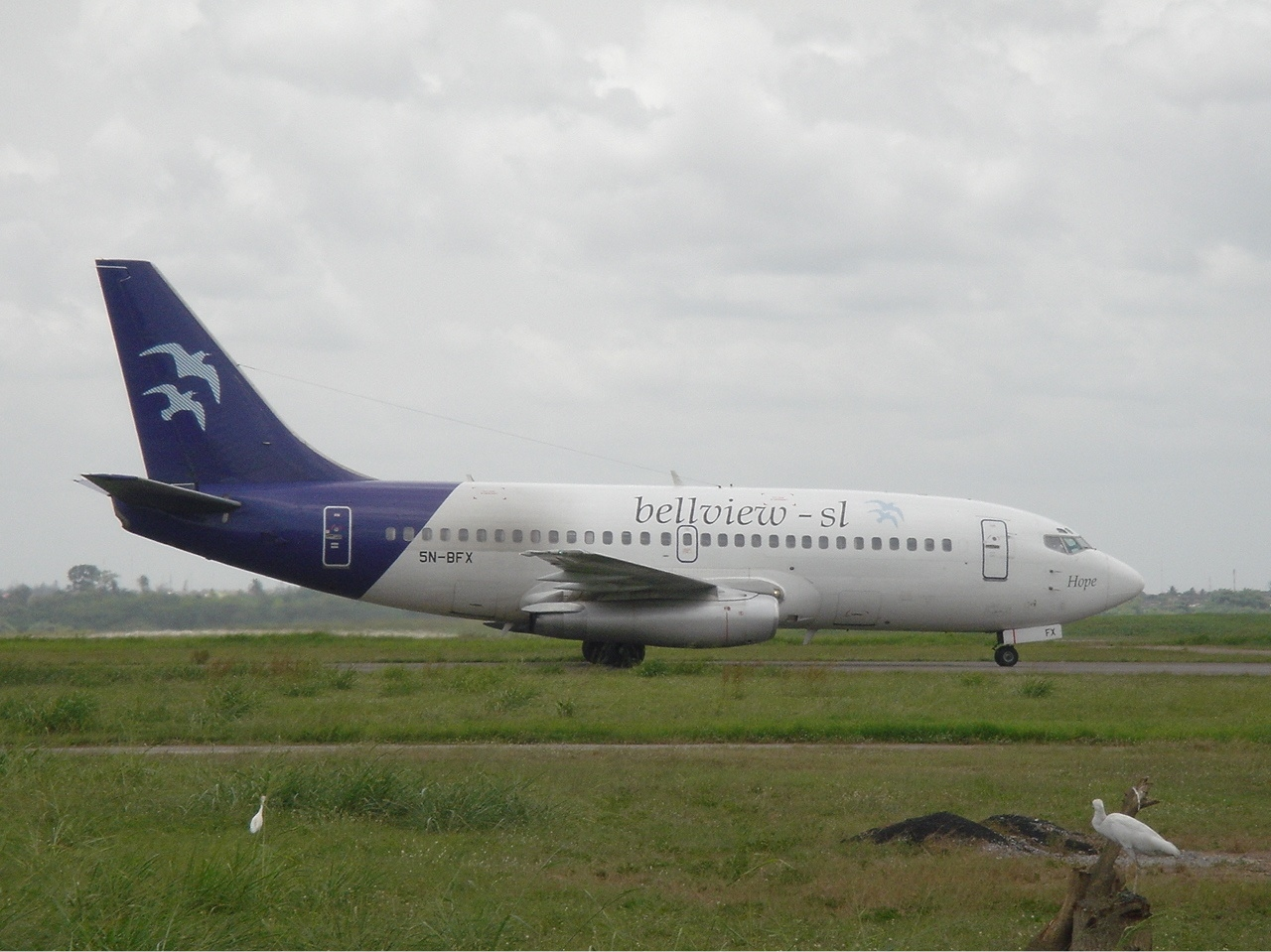
Flight 210 would have been displayed in a livery similar to this Bellview Airlines Boeing 737-200 named Hope at Murtala Muhammed International Airport in 2005

=== Aircraft ===
The aircraft was a 24-year-old Boeing 737-2L9 with two Pratt & Whitney JT8D-17 engines. It was manufactured in 1981 and was acquired by Bellview Airlines in 2003. It was registered under the Nigerian aircraft registration of 5N-BFN. The aircraft had logged more than 55,000 flight hours at the time of the crash.

Inspections were carried out at the facility of Royal Air Maroc in Morocco between December 2004 and February 2005. The last check was performed on the aircraft by Bellview Airlines Engineers at Lagos in October 2005. Review of the engine records showed that the last overhaul of the No. 1 engine was in August 2004, while the No. 2 engine was overhauled in May 2005.

=== Passengers ===
The aircraft was carrying 111 passengers and six crew members, most of whom were thought to be Nigerians. There were also at least 10 Ghanaians; two Malian-French; two British people; two Gambians; and one passenger from Germany and South Africa. United States officials also confirmed the presence of a US army officer, Major Joseph Haydon, on the flight. There was also a Sierra Leone citizen aboard. The flight was popular among Nigerians and expatriates shuttling between the two cities.

Among the passengers were Cheick Oumar Diarra, a general from Mali and Economic Community of West African States (ECOWAS) deputy executive secretary; Waziri Mohammed, chairman of Nigeria Railway Corporation and a close aide to incumbent president Obasanjo; and Nigerian postmaster general Abubakar Musa Argungu. Usman Umar, a member of local council who was also the chairman of Nigeria's Board of Directors of the National Programme on Immunisation, was also on board the flight.

=== Crew ===
The cockpit crew consisted of Captain Imasuen Lambert, First Officer Eshun Ernest and Flight Engineer Steve Sani. Captain Lambert joined Bellview Airlines in October 2004. He had logged 13,429 hours of flight experience, including 1,053 hours on the Boeing 737. Lambert had worked for Imani Aviation, Okada Air, Gas Air and Kabo Air. He was out of active flying for 12 years, between 1992 and 2004, after suffering injuries as a victim of an attempted robbery.

First Officer Eshun Ernest was a Ghanaian national whose wife Sarah was also on board. He was less experienced than Captain Lambert, having a total of 762 flight hours, with 451 of them on the Boeing 737.

== Accident ==
Flight 210 was the final leg of a one-day round trip from Abuja to Abidjan with intermediate stops in Lagos and Accra. The flight was uneventful until the fifth leg. While in Accra, the crews had a discussion on the low pressure reading of the brake accumulator system. The reading, approximately 4,500 kPa (650 psi), was significantly lower than its normal value of 6,900 kPa (1,000 psi). The flight was continued and the reading was logged by crews.

The issue with the brake accumulator system was then discussed by engineer and the maintenance crews. They tried to troubleshoot the system by verifying the pressure reading with another Bellview Airlines Boeing 737. It was later discovered that the faulty reading had originated from a faulty brake accumulator. This was not fixed as the maintenance engineers decided that the aircraft was still within its safe operation limits, and thus the Boeing 737 was allowed to fly from Lagos to Abuja.

On the flight to Abuja, the aircraft was carrying 111 passengers and six crew members, consisting of two flight crews, one engineer and three flight attendants with a destination of Nnamdi Azikiwe International Airport in the nation's capital of Abuja. The flight crews were Captain Imasuen Lambert (49), First Officer Eshun Ernest (42) and Flight Engineer Steve Sani (57).

Flight crews requested start-up clearance at 7:17 p.m. The aircraft then taxied to Runway 18L, and the controller issued the route clearance for Flight 210, with an altitude of 25,000 feet (7,600 m) and right turn-out on course. The flight crews requested a left turn-out, and their request was granted. The wind was blowing at 7 knots (13 km/h; 8 mph) from 270 degrees. The controller then cleared Flight 210 for takeoff. The flight crews asked for another change on the departure, changing it back to a right turn-out on course. The controller granted the request.

Flight 210 took off from Lagos at 7:30 p.m. The controller then instructed the crews to contact Lagos Approach Control. According to the controller, the flight sounded and appeared normal. The pilot made initial contact with Lagos Approach Control and at 07:32 p.m had replied to the controller's instruction. This was the last known transmission from the flight. The controller tried to regain contact with Flight 210 but failed. As a result, the flight was declared missing.

The Nigerian National Emergency Management Agency (NEMA) was then notified for search and rescue operation. Helicopters were deployed to the site where contact with Flight 210 was last made. Search and rescue personnel were not able to pick up signals from the aircraft's Emergency Locator Transmitter (ELT). Conflicting reports then began to emerge, with the aircraft's wreckage reportedly being found by a police helicopter in Oyo State. A spokesman of Oyo State, Abilola Oyoko, initially claimed that more than half of those on board had survived the crash. This statement was later retracted as search and rescue personnel located the wreckage in a village in Ogun State, about 50 kilometres (31 mi; 27 nmi) from Lagos.

The impact left a 9-metre-deep (30 ft) crater and the aircraft was completely destroyed. No major parts of the aircraft were left intact. All 117 passengers and crew on board were killed.

== Investigation ==
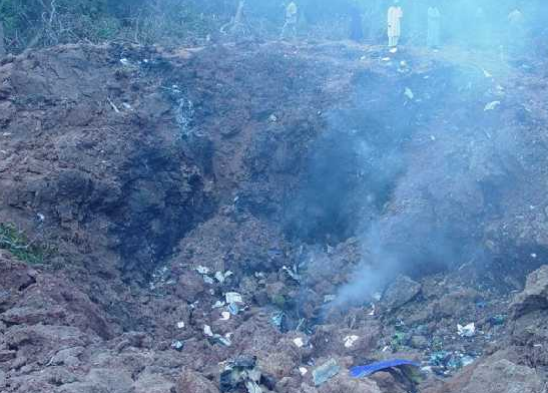
The impact was so powerful that nearly all of the aircraft parts had been turned into bits, hampering the investigation effort.

The accident was investigated by the Nigerian AIB and the US NTSB. Several factors were investigated as possible causes of the crash, including human error, weather condition and sabotage.

Smoke continued to spew out from the crater for several days and investigators stated that the crash was not survivable. The aircraft impacted at a nearly vertical angle at approximately 400 knots (740 km/h; 460 mph), causing most of the aircraft's components to be severely damaged and unidentifiable. Investigators reportedly found human remains with their sizes described as "nothing bigger than toes and fingers." About 60% of the wreckage was recovered. The investigation was hampered by the lack of data recorder evidence as searchers were unable to find either the cockpit voice recorder (CVR) or flight data recorder (FDR) and the airport radar was switched off at the time of the crash for maintenance so the exact path the plane took from takeoff to impact couldn't be determined. There were reports of looting at the crash site.

=== Involvement of bad weather ===
According to The Aviation Herald, Nigerian authorities initially reported that the aircraft had stalled at an altitude of 13,000 feet (4,000 m). The interim report on the crash suggested that the flight was brought down by a lightning strike as thunderstorms were reportedly present during the time of the crash.

The AIB noted that there was a formation of a large convective system near Flight 210 at the time of the accident. As they received satellite imagery information from Nigerian Meteorological Agency, the satellite imagery showed that both infrared and water vapor images revealed the presence of large circular shaped clouds in couplet, especially over the south western portion including Lagos and also over the coastal part of southern Nigeria. The couplet cells appeared to remain stationary or slow moving while intensifying and eventually merging to become a large cloud cell at midnight over the southwestern part of the country. Satellite imagery obtained from Boeing also indicated strong convective storm activity near Flight 210.

The presence of storm cells near Flight 210 could have caused disorientation to the pilots as it might have caused deterioration of the visibility, especially at night. Since neither the horizon nor surface references existed due to the deteriorating visibility, the pilots had to depend on the flight instruments. The pilot's sense of motion might have conflicted with the actual state of the aircraft. The lack of sufficient data rendered the theory to be inconclusive.

=== Sabotage and in-flight fire ===
There were widespread fear of sabotage as some terrorist groups had claimed responsibility for the crash. There was also unverified rumour that the crash was an assassination attempt as one of the passengers was Waziri Mohammed, a close aide to then-Nigerian President Olusegun Obasanjo. Bellview Airlines also raised the possibility of a low level explosion aboard the flight considering that Flight 210 immediately nose dived shortly after take off and that the pilots were not able to declare an emergency.

The Nigerian government invited the Nigerian State Security Services and the American Federal Bureau of Investigation (FBI) to confirm the presence of an explosion on Flight 210. Pieces of burnt fuselage parts of the left side of the underbelly of the aircraft were found approximately 100 feet (30 m; 33 yd) away from the crater. The burnt parts contained a portion of the registration number and another section of the skin with the other part of the registration number. The two pieces matched and were suspected to come from the left side of the fuselage.

The FBI took a piece of the burnt part for laboratory analysis and screened the piece for the presence of explosive residue. The analysis revealed no signs of high explosives on board the aircraft.

According to The Aviation Herald, the FBI had found evidence of a slow fire inside the aircraft, particularly on the luggage compartment with its panel being molten by the intense fire, though it was not hot enough to melt the aircraft's outer skin. The conclusive evidence which would have allowed further identification of a post impact or inflight fire however had disappeared from the crash site. Thus, a conclusion could not be reached.

=== Excessive defects ===
The aircraft had suffered many defects prior to its crash on 22 October. In the past six months, at least 5 defects had been listed in the aircraft's technical log. According to the investigation, the licensed aircraft engineers and technicians often did not carry out the required maintenance work on the aircraft. As such, several of these defects remained on the aircraft until its final flight in 22 October.

On April 6, the technical log recorded a defect on the No.2 fuel flow indicator. This was not replaced until six months later in 13 October. On the next day, 14 October, several other defects were recorded. Both the No.1 and No.2 fuel flow indicators had failed. These defects, however, were not repaired. The AIB stated that the aircraft should have been grounded as there were no working fuel indicator. A major maintenance was conducted later on 17 October but both defects were not repaired again and the aircraft was returned to operate passenger flights.

On 29 September, a stiff on the aircraft's control column with engaged autopilot was recorded in the technical log. A faulty pitch servo motor was noted as the source of the failure, but no maintenance actions were taken by the engineers. The same problem was reported again on 16 October. During a major maintenance on 17 October, the defect was not repaired and it remained in that same state until the accident flight on 22 October.

On 5 October, a surge on engine No.2 compressor during take-off was noted. Again, the defect was not repaired and the aircraft was returned to service. On 14 October, the technical log recorded a defect on one of the aircraft's thrust reversers. In this case, the engineer tried to fix the malfunction. The same problem then appeared again on 21 October. This time, it was not fixed.

Investigators could not determine the role of the five defects on the accident flight. Investigators did rule out a thrust reverser malfunction from the possible causes of the crash, but they could not prove that any of the defects had either singularly or collectively caused the crash.

=== Flight crews ===
Records obtained by Associated Press revealed that Captain Lambert had gone back to work as a pilot just 9 months after being shot in the head in a robbery attempt. He had been hired by Bellview Airlines after he had been working at a dairy for about 14 years. There was also an unverified report that he had been suspended for 2 weeks from the airline for refusing to fly an airplane that was unsafe.

AIB noted that there was a possibility for fatigue and stress to being included as the cause of the crash as examination on the Captain's logbook revealed that he had been burdened by massive workload. Captain Lambert's cumulative flight hours for the past 12 months was 1,864 hours, a gross violation of the maximum 1,000 flight hours. This was also the case with First Officer Ernest as he had flown for a total of 118 hours within a period of 19 days. The Nigerian air regulations stipulates that the maximum flight hours is 100 hours in 30 consecutive days. The investigation also revealed that the pilots' manual included blank pages instead of key safety information.

Considering the possibilities that Captain Lambert had been fatigued or even incapacitated due to his prior head injury, the AIB decided to investigate the issues further. However, it was later discovered that a pathological examination on the Captain could not be conducted due to the severity of the crash. The absence of both flight recorders also made it impossible for the investigators to examine on the possibility of pilot incapacitation.

Records retrieved by AIB revealed that the crew training was not adequate enough for Captain Lambert to fly the Boeing 737 as he had only accumulated a total of 47 hours of line training. This might have been adequate if the captain was an active pilot. As he had been inactive for more than 10 years, he required several other training including full ground school, more line training, and flight simulator. He had been allowed to fly a Boeing 737 as a Captain as he had met the required criteria, in which he should have flown for about 3,500 hours in the Boeing 737. AIB stated that he actually had not acquired the said flight hours.

The crash caused the United States Federal Aviation Administration (FAA) to criticise the Federal Airports Authority of Nigeria (FAAN) as they failed to enforce safety regulations and oversight.

=== Conclusion ===
AIB could not identify the cause of the accident, but considered several factors:

- The pilot-in-command (PIC) training of the Captain was inadequate, and the cumulative flight hours of the pilot in the days before the accident which was indicative of excessive workload that could lead to fatigue. The investigation was unable to determine the captain's medical condition at the time of the accident.
- The aircraft had a number of technical defects and should not have been flown for either the accident flight or earlier flights. The airline failed to maintain an operating and maintenance regime within the regulations and the Civil Aviation Authority's safety oversight of the operator's procedures and operations was inadequate.

With no ability to reconstruct the flight, the investigation was unable to come to any conclusion of the aircraft or crews performance or the effect of the weather on the flight. The AIB could not reach a conclusion about the cause but made four safety recommendations in the report:

1. The Nigerian Civil Aviation Authority should improve oversight of airline maintenance and operations.
2. The Nigerian Airspace Management Agency should increase radar coverage to enhance air traffic services and assist in search and rescue operations.
3. Bellview should improve its maintenance procedures and authorisations.
4. Bellview should review its safety and quality control regime.

== Aftermath ==
Nigerian state television announced three days of national mourning in response to the deaths of the 117 passengers and crew members on board. Nigeria's National Broadcasting Commission added that it would suspend the operation of a local TV station for "showing explicit images" of the crash scene to the public and "delivering unsubstantiated information on the disaster".

President of Nigeria Olusegun Obasanjo personally joined the search and rescue effort. He later urged Nigerians to pray for the victims and their families, later asked the Ministry of Aviation to "plug loopholes" on the safety of Nigeria's aviation sector and ordered tighter and stricter maintenance and safety procedures in the country.

In response to the crash, the government of Ogun State and the Nigerian federal government decided to build a memorial garden in Lisa Town. However, the memorial has been neglected and abandoned since President Obasanjo left the office in 2007. There were attempts to revitalise the memorial, but those attempts never came to fruition.

This accident was mentioned in the short story "The Shivering", published in the book The Thing Around Your Neck, by the Nigerian writer Chimamanda Ngozi Adichie.

The accident is also mentioned in Teju Cole's novel Every Day is for the Thief.

== See also ==
- ADC Airlines Flight 053
- List of unrecovered and unusable flight recorders
- Sosoliso Airlines Flight 1145
- Tatarstan Airlines Flight 363
