= AVH =

AVH may refer to:

- Alex Van Halen, drummer of hard rock band Van Halen
- Alexander von Humboldt
- Alexander von Humboldt German International School Montreal
- Antelope Valley Hospital, a hospital in Lancaster, California
- AVH: Alien vs Hunter, a low budget science fiction film by The Asylum
- A.V.H., a song by Ozzy Osbourne from the album No More Tears
- Armand Van Helden, a DJ
- State Protection Authority, the Hungarian Secret Police between 1948 and 1956 (Államvédelmi Hatóság)
- The Aviation Herald, an aviation incident and accident news reporting site
- AVH: Australasian Virtual Herbarium, an online database containing records of more than 5 million plant specimens kept in some Australian & New Zealand herbaria
- Auditory/visual hallucinations, in medicine
