= Flydubai Flight 981 =

2016 aircraft accident in Russia

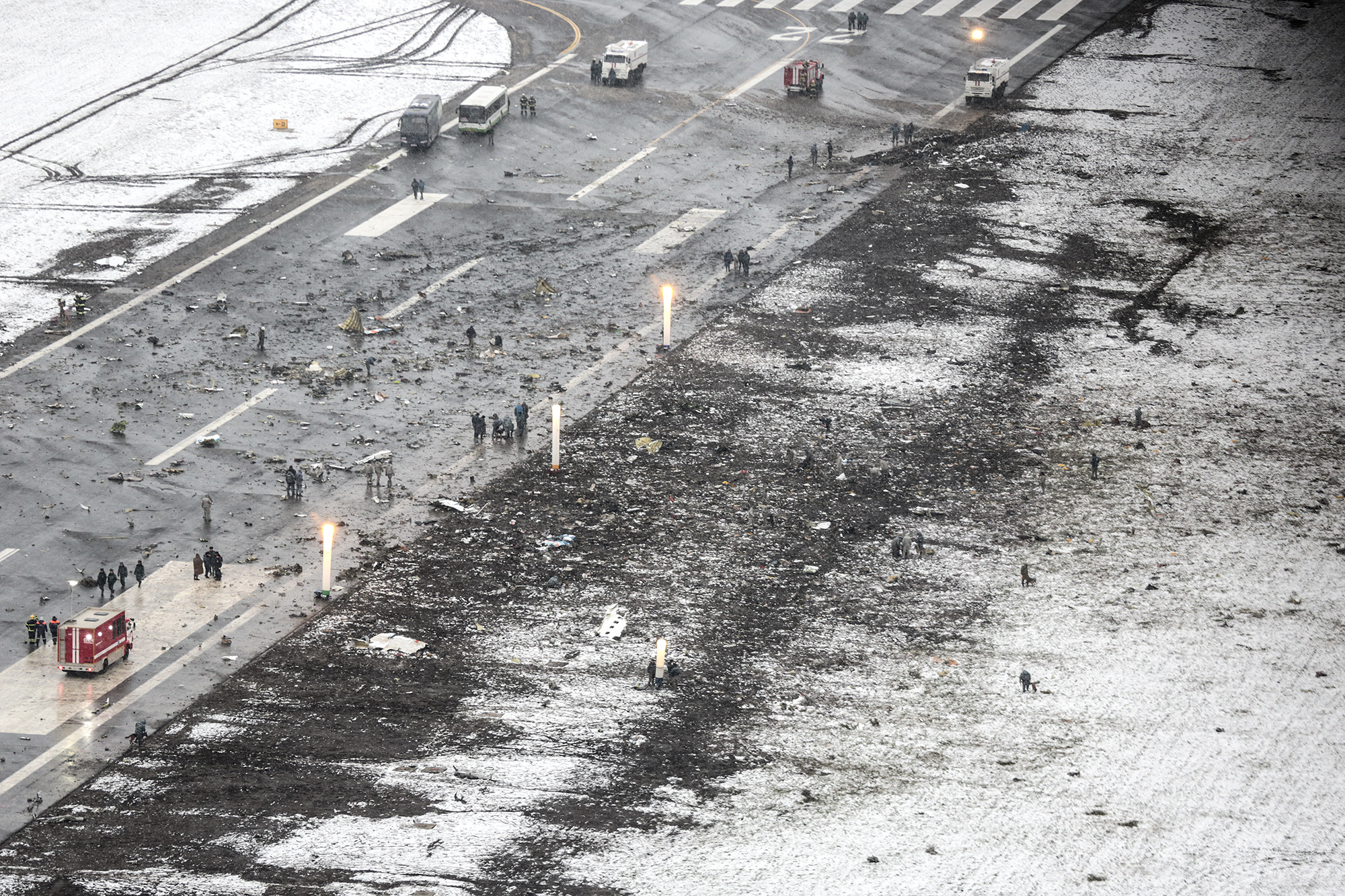
- Aerial view of the crash site

Accident
- Date: 19 March 2016
- Summary: Spatial disorientation during go-around due to pilot error and lack of situational awareness leading to loss of control
- Site: Rostov-on-Don Airport, Rostov-on-Don, Russia; 47°15′54.7″N 39°49′43.8″E

Aircraft
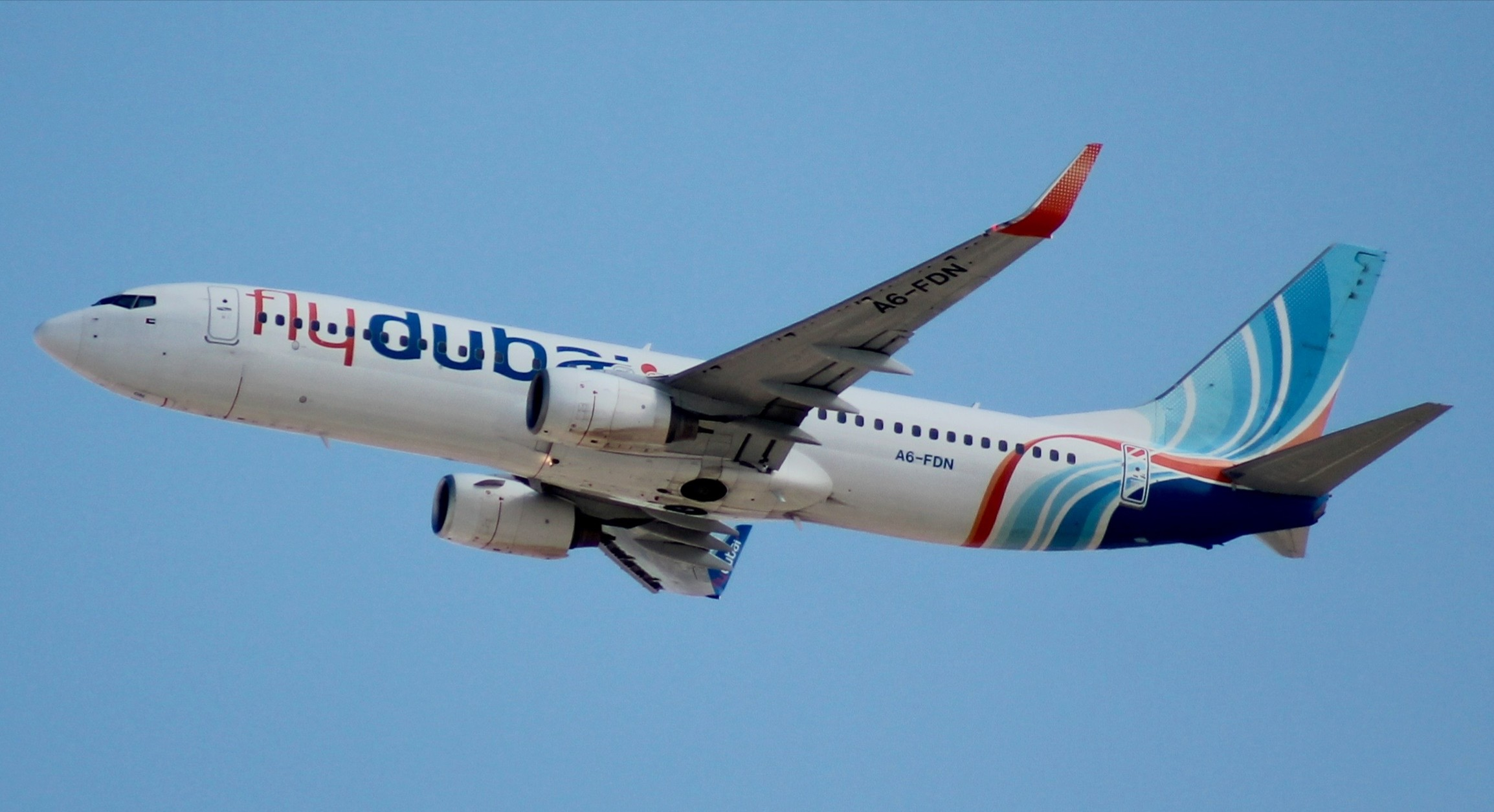
- A6-FDN, the aircraft involved in the accident, pictured in 2015
- Aircraft type: Boeing 737-8KN
- Operator: Flydubai
- IATA flight No.: FZ981
- ICAO flight No.: FDB981
- Call sign: SKYDUBAI 981
- Registration: A6-FDN
- Flight origin: Dubai International Airport, Dubai, United Arab Emirates
- Destination: Rostov-on-Don Airport, Rostov-on-Don, Russia
- Occupants: 62
- Passengers: 55
- Crew: 7
- Fatalities: 62
- Survivors: 0

Flydubai Flight 981 (FZ981/FDB981) was a scheduled international passenger flight from Dubai, United Arab Emirates, to Rostov-on-Don, Russia. On 19 March 2016, the Boeing 737-800 aircraft operating the flight crashed during a go-around, killing all 62 passengers and crew on board.

The accident occurred at night and the weather at Rostov-on-Don was poor. Flight 981 aborted its first landing attempt and entered a holding pattern for nearly two hours before making a second landing attempt. After aborting the second attempt, the aircraft climbed sharply during the go-around procedure and then descended rapidly and crashed onto the runway.

== Background ==
The flight's origin and destination

=== Airline ===
Flydubai is an Emirati state-owned low-cost carrier with its hub in Dubai. Its chairman Sheikh Ahmed bin Saeed Al Maktoum is also the chairman of Dubai-based Emirates. Flydubai was founded and commenced operations in 2009, and expanded rapidly. At the time of the crash, it flew to over 100 destinations, including 11 in Russia, with its entire fleet consisting of Boeing 737-800s. Flydubai launched its Rostov-on-Don service in September 2013 with two scheduled flights per week.

The airline had no previous fatal accidents and had an excellent safety record. In 2015, Flydubai passed the safety audit of the IATA, and several days before the crash had become an official member of the organization. In the aftermath of the crash, Flydubai pilots raised concerns about duty-related fatigue. One pilot who told BBC News that staff had insufficient time to rest between shifts also informed senior management, who replied that "we don't have a fatigue issue at Flydubai." Another employee estimated that most of the 25 pilots (from a total of 600) who resigned from the airline in 2016 had done so because of "fatigue, rosters and quality of life." Some of the pilots believed that an accident was inevitable. In response to the allegations, Flydubai stated: "We are unable to disclose confidential information relating to our employees."

=== Aircraft ===
The aircraft involved was a six-year-old Boeing 737-8KN, (Note: The aircraft was a Boeing 737-800 model; Boeing assigns a unique customer code for each company that buys one of its aircraft, which is applied as a suffix to the model number at the time the aircraft is built. Boeing's code for FlyDubai is "KN", hence "737-8KN".) registered as A6-FDN, MSN 40241, and was powered by two CFM International CFM56-7B27 engines. Its first flight occurred on 19 December 2010 and it was delivered to Flydubai on 24 January 2011. The aircraft had passed a C-grade maintenance check on 21 January 2016.

The plane, which carried enough fuel for 8.5 hours of flight, had been flying for six hours prior to the crash.

=== Flight crew ===
The captain was 37-year-old Aristos Sokratous from Cyprus, who had over 6,000 hours of total flying time, including 4,905 hours on the Boeing 737. Sokratous was promoted to captain a year and a half before the crash. At the time of the crash, he intended to quit the airline after accepting a job from Ryanair that would allow him to return to be with his family in Cyprus. His wife was due to give birth to their first child a few weeks after the crash. According to several Flydubai staff members, Sokratous decided to leave the airline mainly because of fatigue and lifestyle issues, and Flight 981 was one of his last flights with the airline.

The first officer, 36-year-old Alejandro Álava Cruz from Spain, had more than 5,700 hours of flying time, with 1,100 on the Boeing 737. He began work with Flydubai in 2013 and had previously flown for two regional airlines in the Spanish Canary Islands, Binter Canarias and NAYSA, before joining the airline.

According to the final report by the Interstate Aviation Committee (IAC), the accident flight was both pilots' first-ever flight to Rostov. The captain had experience flying into other Russian airports, but the first officer did not.

=== Weather ===
The meteorological conditions at Rostov-on-Don Airport were described as "adverse." The cloud base was at 630 metres (2,070 ft), with light rain showers and a haze. The wind velocity was 13 m/s (25 kn; 47 km/h; 29 mph), gusting to 18 m/s (35 kn; 65 km/h; 40 mph), from 230 degrees, with severe turbulence and moderate wind shear on the final-approach course.

== Accident ==
Flight 981 was scheduled to depart from Dubai International Airport at 21:45 Gulf Standard Time (UTC+4) on 18 March 2016 and arrive at Rostov-on-Don Airport at 01:20 Moscow Standard Time (UTC+3) the next day. It departed from Dubai after a 35-minute delay at 22:20 GST. When Flight 981 arrived at the initial fix to begin the approach to Rostov-on-Don, two other flights had landed during the previous 20 minutes.

An alert from Flight 981's onboard windshear-warning system caused the pilots to abandon their landing approach a few kilometres from the runway. The flight entered a holding pattern near the airport, awaiting improvement to the weather. While Flight 981 was holding, Aeroflot Flight 1166 made three unsuccessful attempts to land and then diverted to nearby Krasnodar International Airport, landing there at 02:59.

Nearly two hours later, during the crew's second approach to Runway 22, the airspeed suddenly increased by 23 knots (43 km/h; 26 mph), an indication that the aircraft had encountered windshear, and again the crew initiated a go-around. In contrast to the first go-around, the pilots retracted the landing gear and reduced the flaps setting. This caused the nose to pitch up significantly, and the captain (who was flying the airplane) attempted to counter the force with considerable effort on the control column. The captain pressed the nose-down trim switch, but continued to push the control column as well. This caused the aircraft to pitch down and enter a 45-degree descent. At 03:42, it crashed onto the runway near the threshold and caught fire. There were no survivors. Pieces of the aircraft were strewn across Runway 22 following the impact.

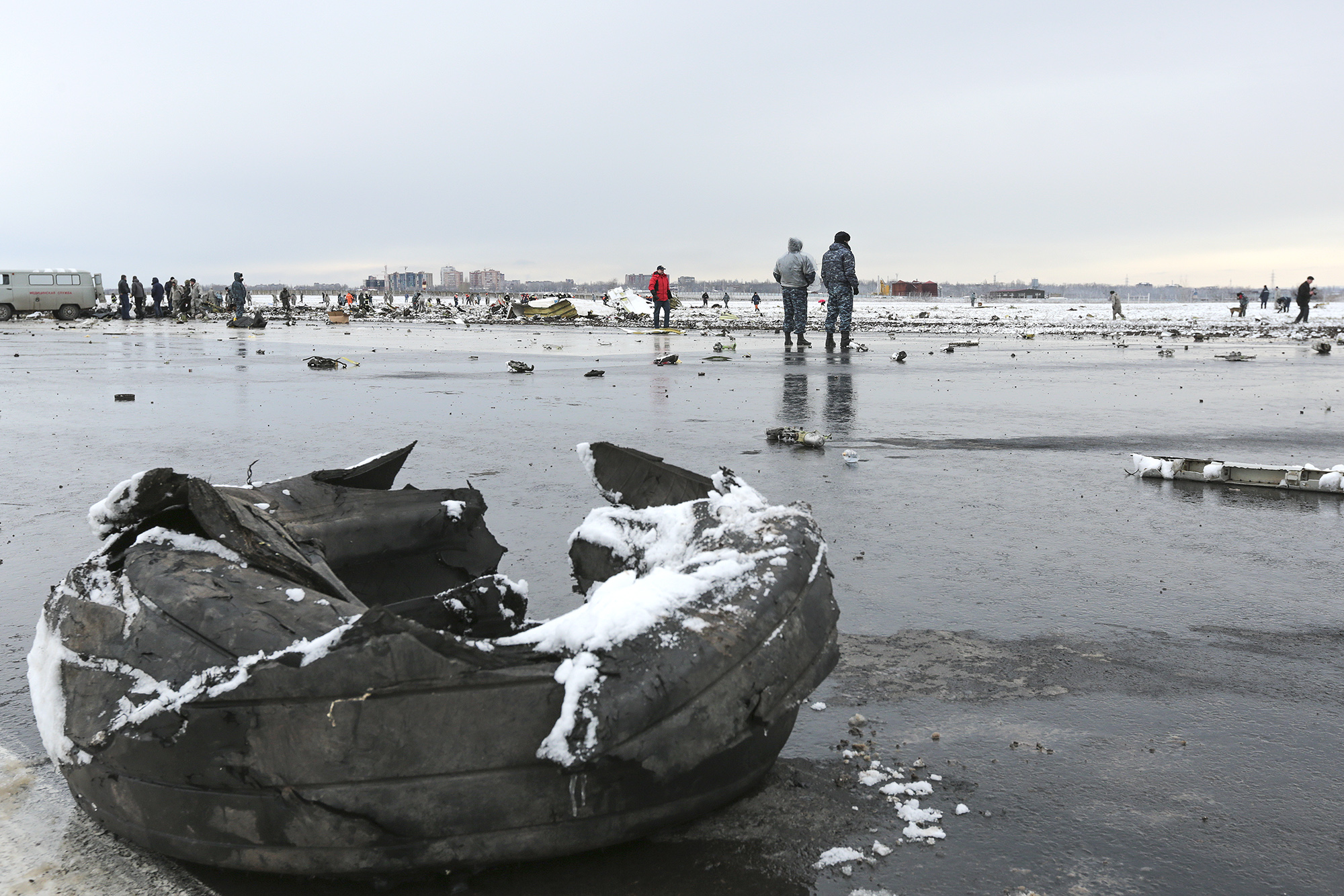

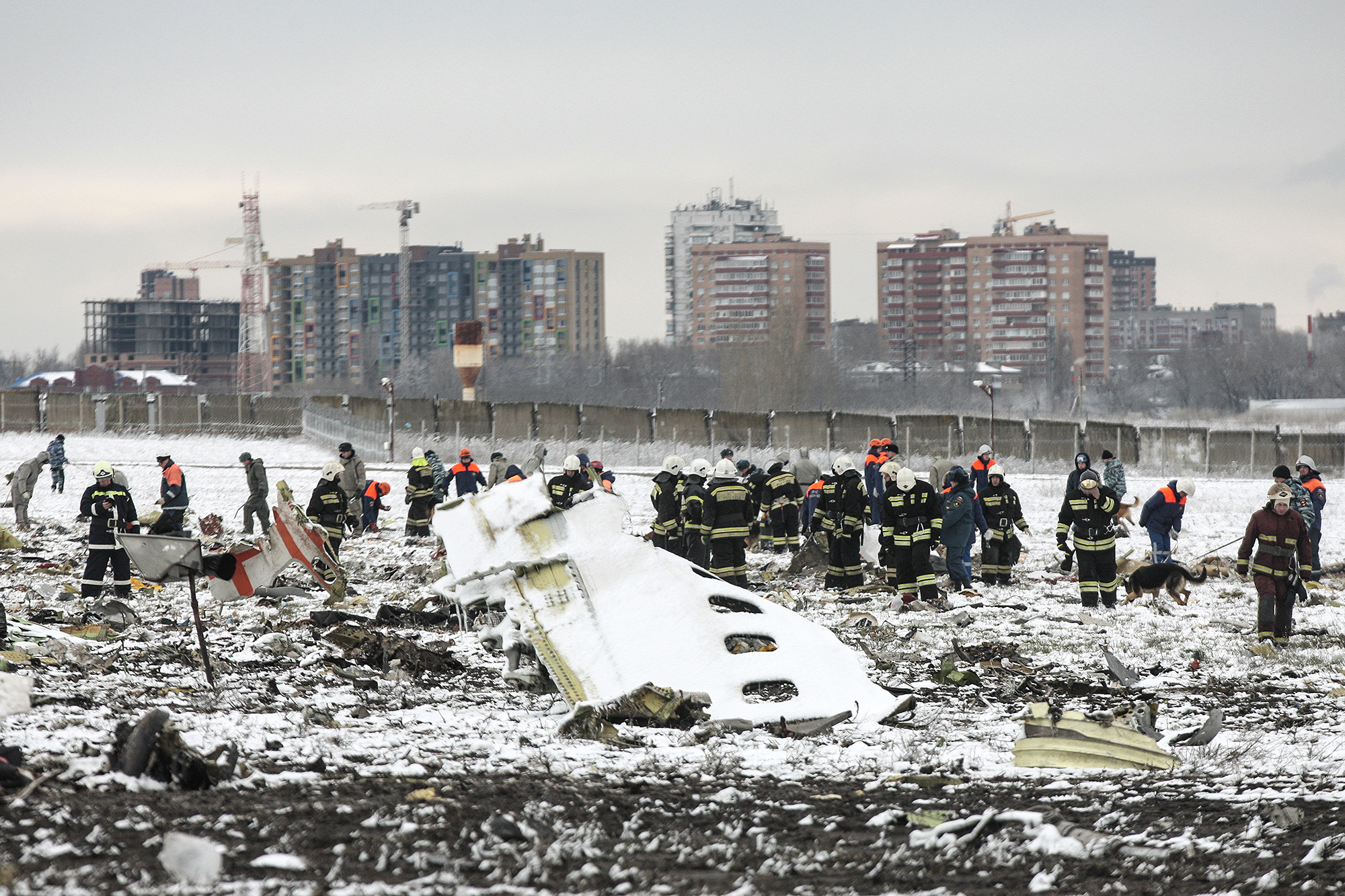

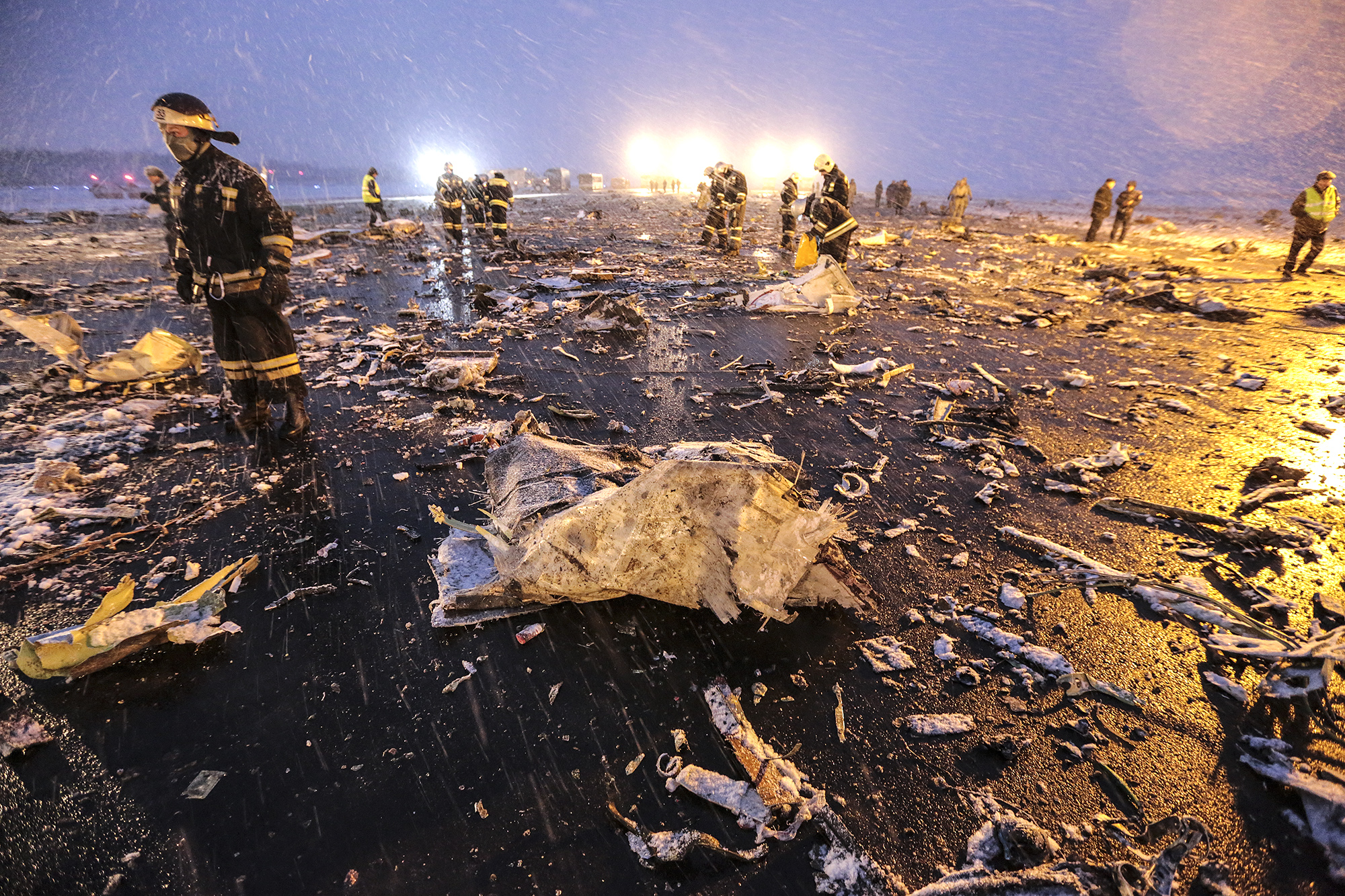

== Victims ==
People on board by nationality
Nation	Passengers	Crew	Total
Russia	44	1	45
Ukraine	8	0	8
India	2	0	2
Uzbekistan	1	0	1
Spain	0	2	2
Colombia	0	1	1
Cyprus	0	1	1
Kyrgyzstan	0	1	1
Seychelles	0	1	1
Total	55	7	62

All 62 people on board, consisting of 55 passengers and 7 crew members, were killed in the crash. Of the passengers, 44 (including four children) were Russian citizens. Eight other passengers came from Ukraine, two from India and one from Uzbekistan. Thirty of the passengers were tourists on a package tour offered by Natalie Tours, one of the largest Russian tour operators. The seven crew members included Alex Confait, son of Seychellois Olympic sprinter Vincent Confait.

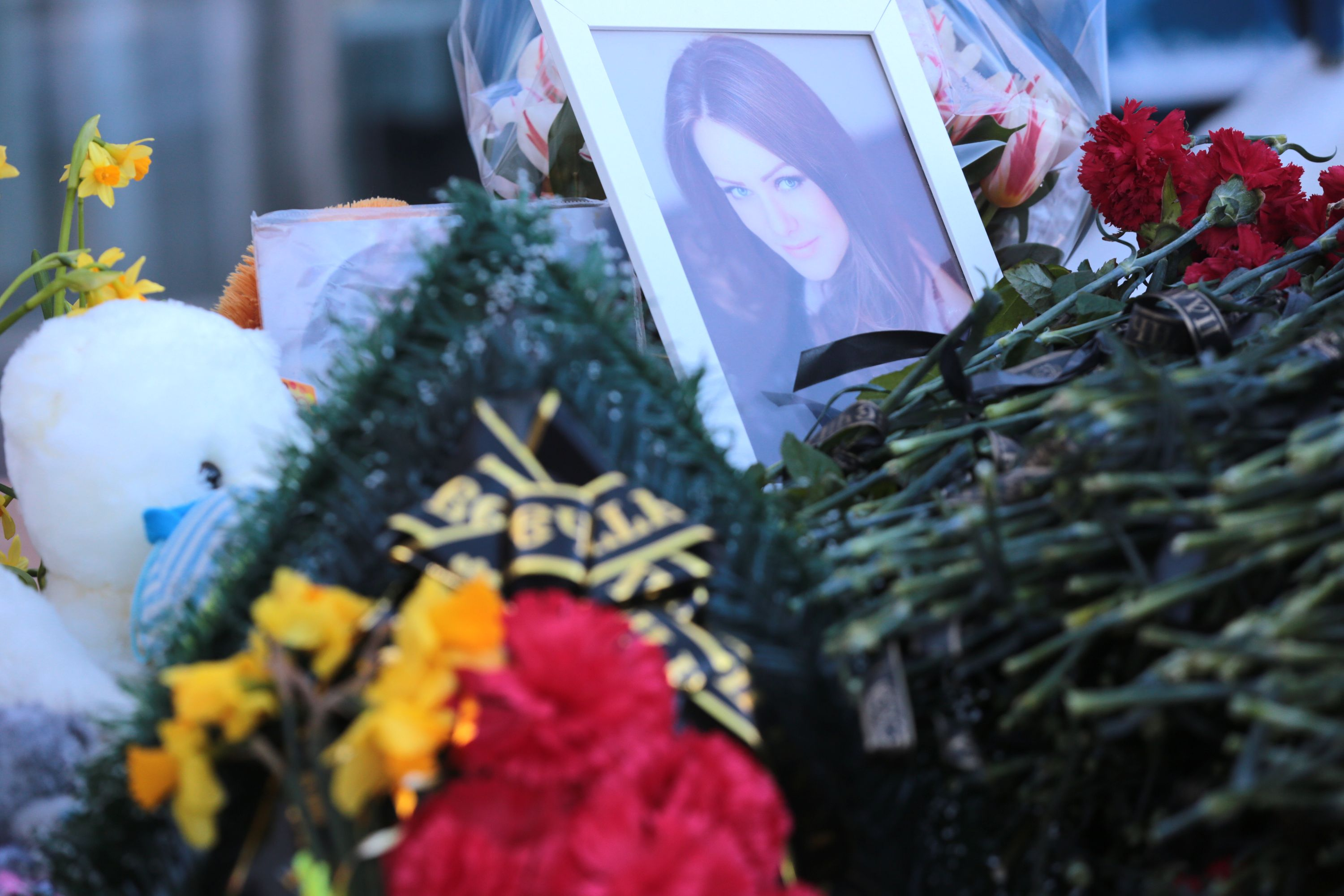
Memorial at the airport

== Investigation ==
A NASA animation depicting an aircraft's elevator pitch

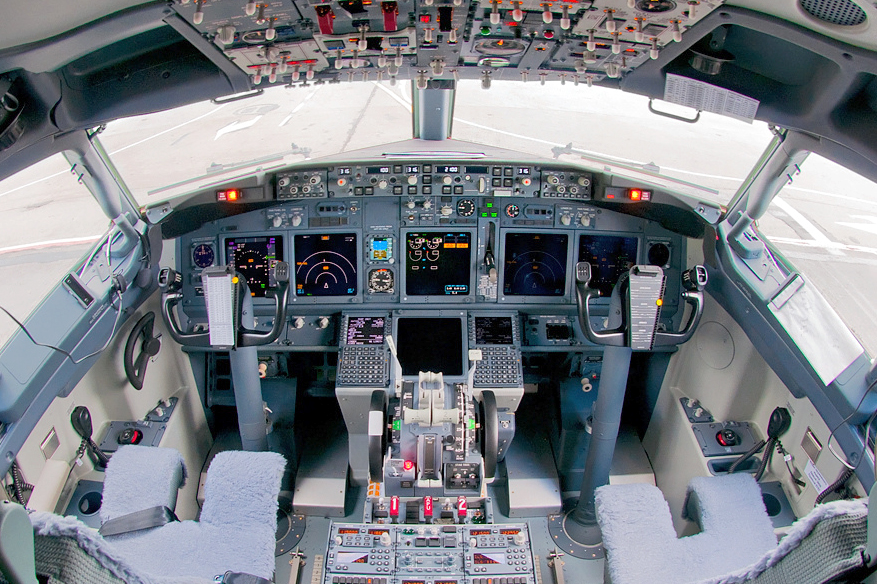
A Boeing 737-800 cockpit

On the day of the crash, an investigative commission was established by the Interstate Aviation Committee (IAC) to determine the circumstances and causes of the crash. The investigation was led by Russian air accident investigators, and included representatives of the aviation authorities of the United Arab Emirates, the United States (the country of the aircraft's design and manufacture) and France (the country where the aircraft's engines were designed). The American team consisted of air-accident investigators from the National Transportation Safety Board, experts from Boeing and representatives of the Federal Aviation Administration.

The Russian Investigative Committee opened an investigation into possible safety violations leading to the crash and allocated more than 50 investigators to work on the case. In a statement, it listed "crew error, technical failure, adverse weather conditions and other factors" as possible reasons for the crash. Terrorism was eliminated as a possibility as no traces of explosives were found.

=== Progress ===
On 20 March 2016, investigators completed a survey of the wreckage. Russian and Emirati experts started an analysis of the radar data, flight crew–ATC communications and meteorological information. Both flight recorders were recovered from the crash site and delivered to the Interstate Aviation Committee in Moscow.

On 20 and 21 March 2016, investigators from Russia, the United Arab Emirates (UAE) and France extracted the memory modules from their protective casings and downloaded the data from both the flight data recorder (FDR) and the cockpit voice recorder (CVR). Both recorders functioned normally until the time of impact. While their outer casings sustained some damage, the quality of both recordings was good. A transcript of the communication between the captain and first officer was prepared, and the data was analyzed. Investigators also began synchronizing information from the flight recorders, ATC data and meteorological information.

On 21 March 2016, investigators in Rostov-on-Don finished collecting debris from the crash site and started reconstructing the fuselage layout in a hangar. Another group of investigators based in Moscow, together with Emirati investigators, airline representatives and experts from Cyprus and Spain, started to collect and analyse materials related to the aircraft's airworthiness, Flight 981's preparation before departure and the training of its flight crew.

On 23 March 2016, Russian and foreign investigators began to test the Rostov Airport's radio-communication equipment, examine ATC communications with other flight crews before the crash and evaluate the actions of the ATC and the airport's meteorological services. Using data retrieved from the flight recorders, as well as information from the aircraft maintenance log and flight documentation, the investigators began to analyse the operation of all Flight 981's aircraft systems, including the flight-control system and engines, and also analysed the actions and state of the crew during the entire flight.

On 29 March 2016, the IAC announced that preliminary analysis of information from the flight recorders showed no evidence of the failure of any aircraft systems, engines or other components. The airworthiness certificate was valid and all necessary maintenance history was in proper order at the time of departure. A transcript of more than two hours of the last crew communications was prepared but was not released to the press, as international and Russian rules of air-crash investigation forbid publication. The IAC requested that Boeing provide technical documentation to aid in the assessment of the aircraft's system operations as well as information about all similar previous incidents with Boeing airframes.

On 20 April 2016, a first interim report was published by the IAC.

In August 2018, the IAC began reconstructing data from the head-up display (HUD) system.

=== Final report ===
On 26 November 2019, the IAC published its final report, which stated the cause as a combination of incorrect aircraft configuration, pilot error and the subsequent loss of the pilot-in-command's situational awareness in nighttime storm conditions. The go-around procedure with retracted landing gear and flaps but with the maximum available thrust consistent with the windshear escape manoeuver, combined with the lightness of the aircraft, led to the excessive nose-up attitude.

== Reactions ==
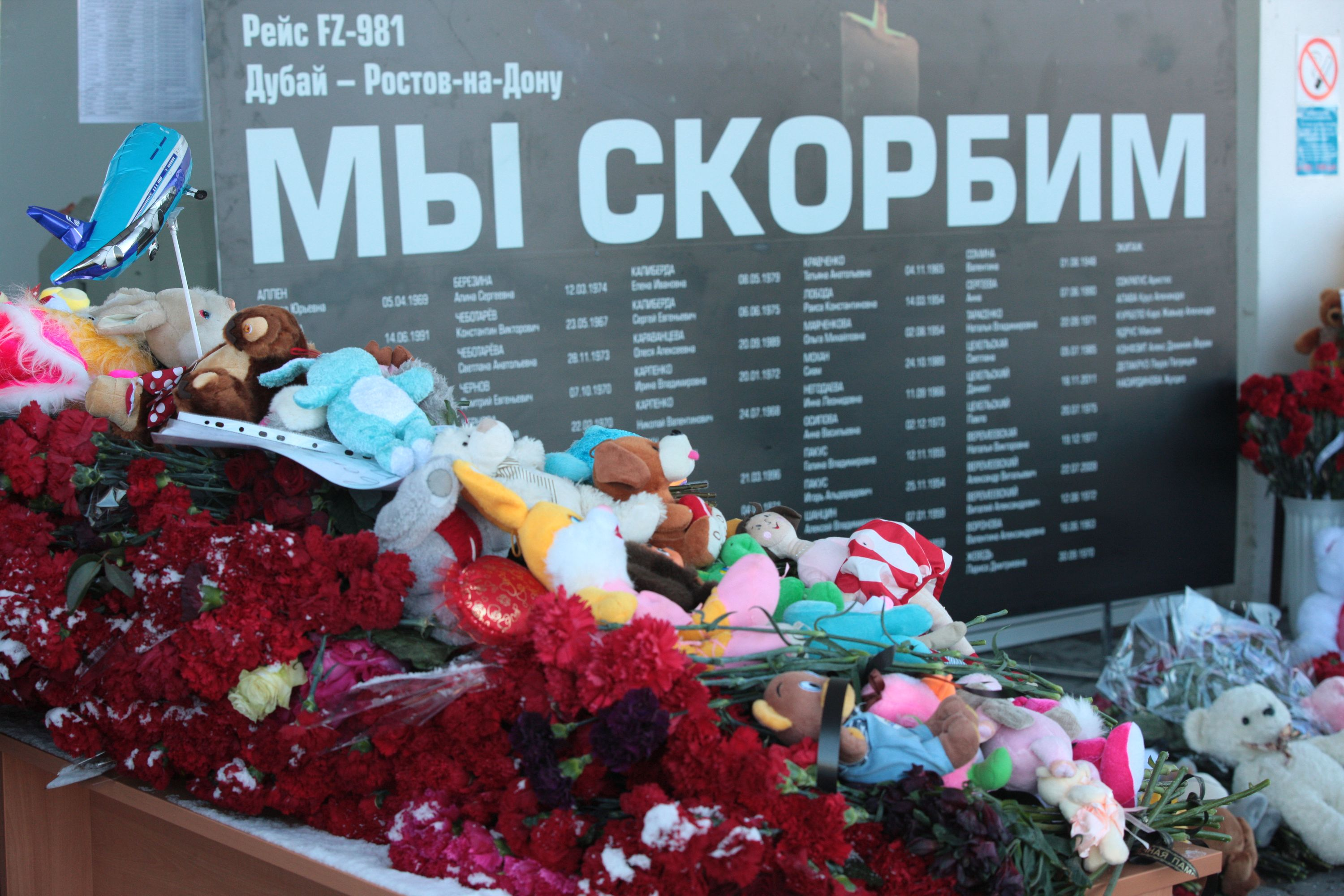
Memorial at the airport

In light of the disaster, Rostov Oblast governor Vasily Golubev announced that the government would pay one million rubles (about 15,000 USD) to the families of the victims. The day after the crash, 20 March, was designated as a day of mourning in the region.

On 21 March 2016, Flydubai opened a family-assistance centre for the families of the victims in Rostov-on-Don. It announced a payment of US$20,000 per passenger for the "immediate financial needs" of their families, but it subsequently paid only US$1,913 per passenger. The airline resumed regular flights to Rostov as soon as the airport reopened after the crash, but assigned a different flight number for the route.

At a press conference, Flydubai CEO Ghaith Al Ghaith informed Emirati journalists that specialists from the company's engineering, safety and security departments were working closely on the ground with the Russian investigators. He asked the media to refrain from speculation and "give the investigators time to do their job and come out with results."

On 24 March 2016, crown prince of Abu Dhabi Mohammed bin Zayed Al Nahyan travelled to Moscow to discuss the course of the crash investigation with Russian president Vladimir Putin.

Aviation expert Alexander Knivel highlighted multiple similarities between Flight 981 and Tatarstan Airlines Flight 363. In both cases, a Boeing 737 impacted the airfield at a high vertical speed while attempting a go-around. The Flight 363 investigation, conducted by the Interstate Aviation Committee, ruled that the 2013 accident was the result of pilot error. However, a dissenting opinion report claimed that the commission ignored a possible mechanical malfunction of the Boeing 737's elevator controls.

On 28 March 2016, Artyom Kiryanov, a Russian Civic Chamber member, called for Russia's Federal Air Transport Agency and the IAC to suspend the flying certificates of all Russian owned-and-operated Boeing 737 Classics and Next Generation series, until the end of the Flight 981 investigation, citing concerns about the elevator controls in all 737s. After this news reached the U.S., Boeing's stock fell 0.81% on the New York Stock Exchange.

On 12 April 2016, the American law firm Ribbeck Law, on behalf of several relatives of the victims, filed a lawsuit against Boeing in the Circuit Court of Cook County in Chicago, pursuing financial compensation of US$5 million per passenger on the flight.

== Aftermath ==
On 23 March 2016, as a result of the crash, Flydubai officially retired the flight number 981 and replaced with the new number for the Dubai to Rostov-on-Don flight as Flight 935.

== In popular culture ==
The crash was featured in season 22, episode 1 of the Canadian documentary series Mayday, titled "Holding Pattern."

== See also ==
The IAC reports refer to the following accidents:

- Armavia Flight 967: An Airbus A320 that crashed during a go-around at sea in 2006
- China Airlines Flight 140: An Airbus A300 that crashed near the runway during a go-around in 1994
- Pulkovo Aviation Enterprise Flight 9560
- Aeroflot Flight N-528: An accident caused by pilot error during an attempted go-around
- Aeroflot Flight 821: A 737 that crashed before landing in Russia as a result of pilot spatial disorientation
- Tatarstan Airlines Flight 363: A 737 that crashed before landing in Russia as a result of pilot spatial disorientation
- 1999 Martha's Vineyard plane crash, a Piper PA-32R that crashed near Martha's Vineyard mainly as the result of spatial disorientation
- 2020 Calabasas helicopter crash, a helicopter that crashed in Calabasas, California as the result of spatial disorientation and pilot error.
