= Tatarstan Airlines =

Regional airline of Tatarstan, Russia

JSC Tatarstan Airlines ОАО «Авиакомпания „Татарстан“» (Russian)
IATA	ICAO	Call sign
U9	TAK	TATARSTAN
- Founded: 1993
- Commenced operations: 1999
- Ceased operations: 1 January 2014
- Hubs: Kazan International Airport
- Focus cities: Begishevo Airport
- Fleet size: 9
- Destinations: 13
- Headquarters: Kazan Airport; Kazan, Russia
- Key people: Aksan Rimovich Giniyatullin (CEO)
- Website: www.tatarstan.aero

Tatarstan Airlines (Note: Tatar: Татарстан Һава Юллары, romanized: Tatarstan Hawa Yulları; Russian: ОАО «Авиакомпания „Татарстан“», romanized: «Aviakompaniya „Tatarstan“») was a regional airline of the Republic of Tatarstan, part of the Russian Federation. It was based at Kazan Airport in Kazan, Tatarstan, Russia and operated from 1993 until 2013.

== History ==
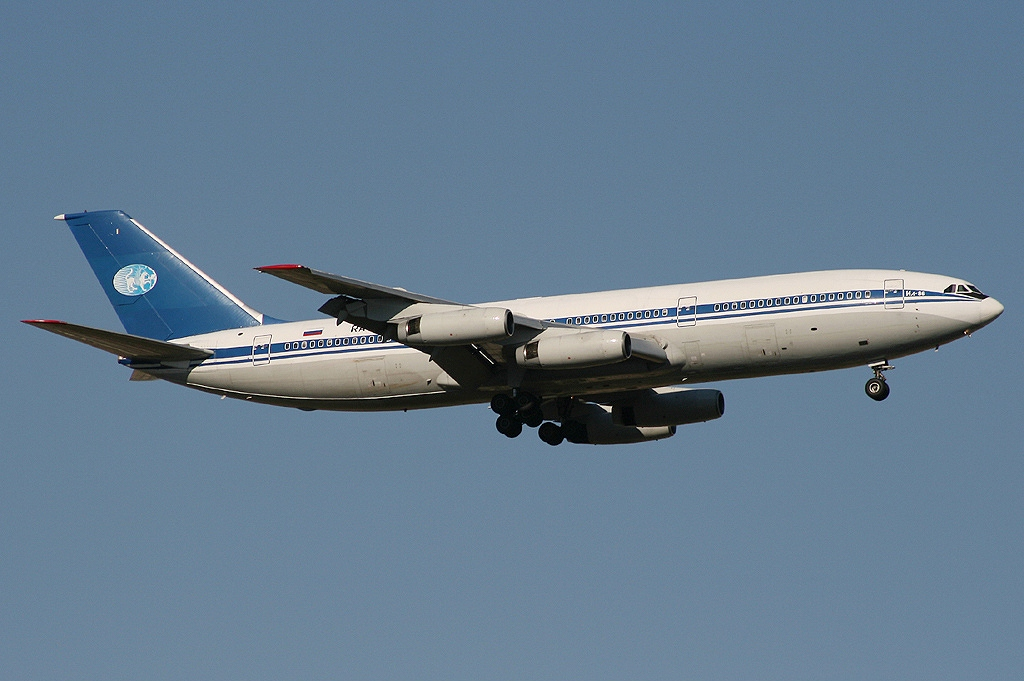
An Ilyushin Il-86 of Tatarstan Airlines landing at Antalya Airport in 2007

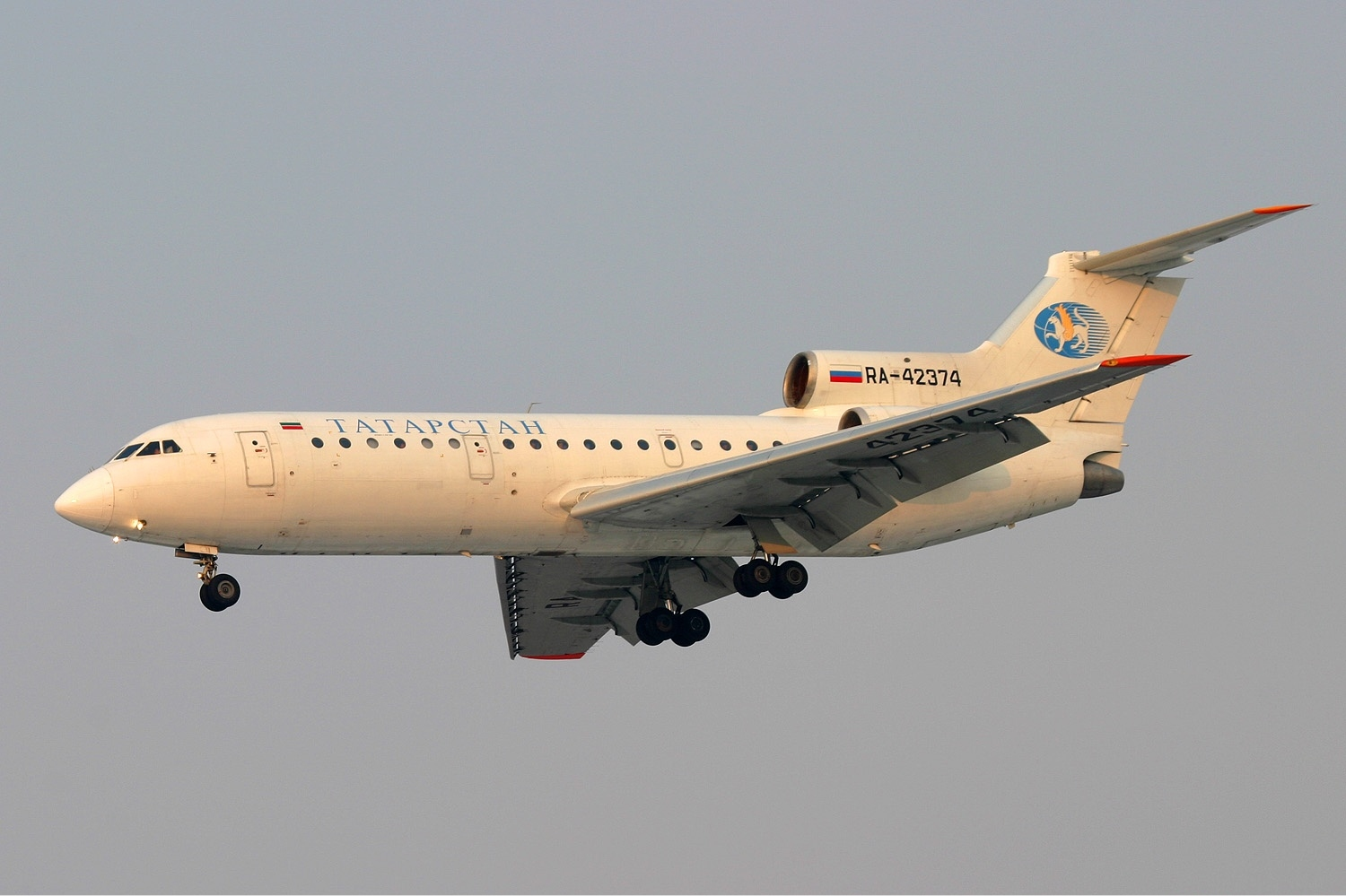
A Tatarstan Airlines Yakovlev Yak-42 approaches Domodedovo International Airport in 2005.

Tatarstan Airlines was founded in 1993 and started flights in 1999. It operated scheduled flights to destinations in Russia and abroad including seasonal charter flights to holiday destinations.

In 2012, Tatarstan Airlines announced that it would work with Turkish Airlines to make Kazan airport a federal hub.

In November 2013, the crash of Tatarstan Airlines Flight 363 killed all 50 passengers and crew. Russia's air transport regulator Rosaviatsiya recommended that Tatarstan Airlines' operating license be withdrawn after air incident investigators concluded that the crash was due to overworked and inadequately trained crew. The airline's operating license was revoked on 31 December 2013 and its aircraft were transferred to Ak Bars Aero.

== Destinations ==
Tatarstan Airlines operated scheduled passenger services to cities in Russia including Moscow, Saint Petersburg and Makhachkala as well as international destinations Baku, Dushanbe, Yerevan, Tashkent, Khujand, Istanbul, Prague, and Tel Aviv. Tatarstan Airlines operated charter services in Russia, Bulgaria, Egypt, Greece and Turkey. In 2010–2011, Tatarstan Airlines flew 40 routes. In 2009 it carried 577,000 passengers, which grew to 603,000 in 2010 and 824,000 in 2011.

=== Commercial partnership/Interline agreements ===
Tatarstan Airlines had a close commercial partnership with its sister carrier Ak Bars Aero and interline agreements with Turkish Airlines and Czech Airlines.

- Ak Bars Aero
- Czech Airlines (SkyTeam)
- Turkish Airlines (Star Alliance)

== Fleet ==
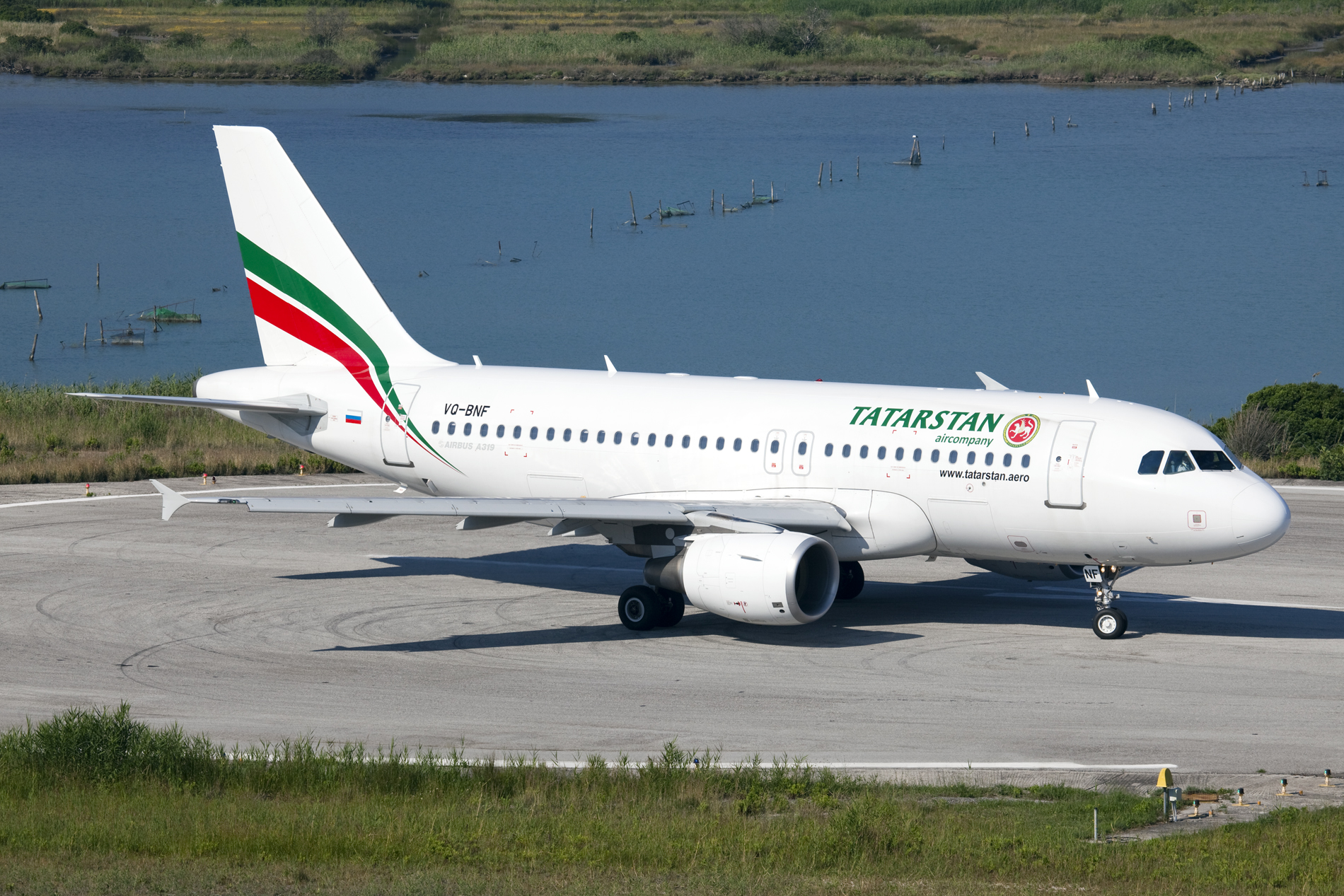
An Airbus A319 of Tatarstan Airlines at Corfu International Airport in 2012

Tatarstan Airlines fleet
Aircraft	In Fleet	Orders	Passengers			Notes
Aircraft	In Fleet	Orders	B	Y	Total	Notes
Airbus A319-100	4	1	0	156	156	Charter routes only
Boeing 737-400	1	0	12/0	138/150	150	
Bombardier CRJ-200	0	2				
Tupolev Tu-154M	2	0	0	164	164	
Yakovlev Yak-42	2	0	16/0	84/120	100/120	
Total	9	3				

== Accidents and incidents ==
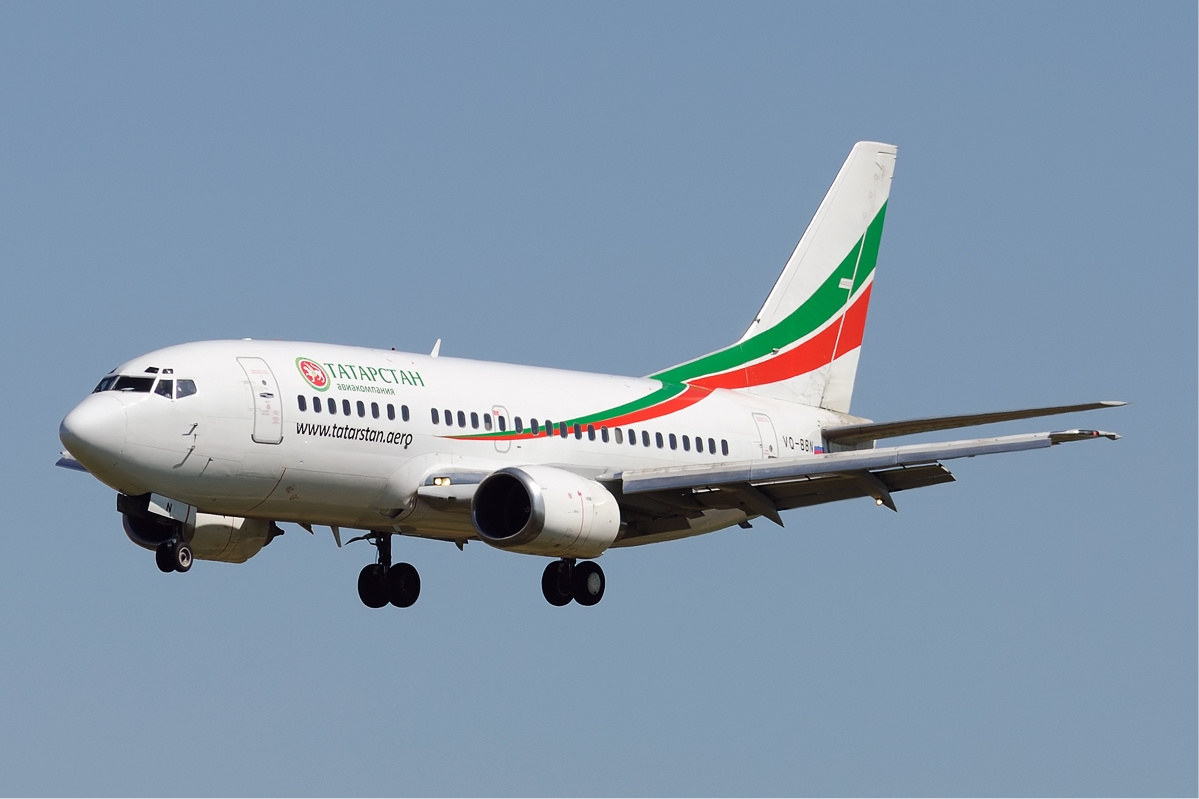
This Boeing 737-500, registered VQ-BBN, was destroyed on 17 November 2013 in the crash of Flight 363, seen here approaching Kazan Airport in 2009.

On 17 November 2013, Boeing 737-500 (VQ-BBN) arriving from Moscow crashed on landing at Kazan International Airport. All 44 passengers and 6 crew members were killed. The crash resulted in the temporary closure of the airport.
