= Cheick Oumar Diarra =

Minister of Transport and Public Works
- In office April 5, 1991 – August 26, 1991

Personal details
- Born: January 30, 1944 Markala, Mali
- Died: October 22, 2005 (aged 61) Lisa, Ogun State, Lagos, Nigeria

Military service
- Rank: Divisional general

Cheick Oumar Diarra (January 30, 1944 – October 22, 2005) was a Malian soldier and major general.

== Biography ==
Diarra trained at the Joint Military School (EMIA). After graduating in 1969, Diarra continued his military training at the Kiev Aviation Training School in present-day Ukraine. He then trained at the staff school and the war school of Paris. When he returned to Mali, he exercised various military functions. In 1991, following the overthrow of president Moussa Traoré, Diarra was appointed as Minister of Transport and Public Works in the transitional government.

In 2000, Diarra was appointed as itinerant ambassador of Mali to the Economic Community of West African States (ECOWAS). He served as deputy executive secretary and was in charge of political affairs, defense and security. On October 22, 2005, while still holding this position, Diarra was killed in the crash of Bellview Airlines Flight 210 in Nigeria.

Diarra was buried on October 30 in Bamako in a national funeral ceremony led by president Amadou Toumani Touré who posthumously awarded Diarra Grand Officer of the National Order of Mali.
