= Bellview Airlines (Sierra Leone) =

IATA	ICAO	Call sign
B3	BVU	BELLVIEW AIRLINES
- Founded: 1995
- Ceased operations: 2008
- Destinations: See Destinations below
- Parent company: Bellview Airlines (Nigeria)
- Headquarters: Sierra Leone

Bellview Airlines was an airline based in Sierra Leone. It was established and started operations in 1995, and was jointly owned by Bellview Airlines and Sierra-Leonean investors. It has since been merged back into the parent company in Nigeria.

The airline was on the banned from flying in European Union skies. In 2008, Bellview Airlines had its licence revoked.

== Code data ==
- IATA Code: O3
- ICAO Code: BVU
- Callsign: Not Allocated

== Destinations ==
A variety of destinations in West Africa, including Freetown, Abidjan and Accra, as well as flights between Freetown and London Heathrow.
