= Alfred Obschernikat =

German water polo player

Personal information
- Nationality: German
- Born: 14 May 1926 Duisburg, Germany
- Died: 15 October 2005 (aged 79) Duisburg, Germany

Sport
- Sport: Water polo

Alfred Obschernikat (14 May 1926 – 15 October 2005) was a German water polo player. He competed in the men's tournament at the 1956 Summer Olympics.
