= Halisa Air =

Haitian airline (1991-1998)

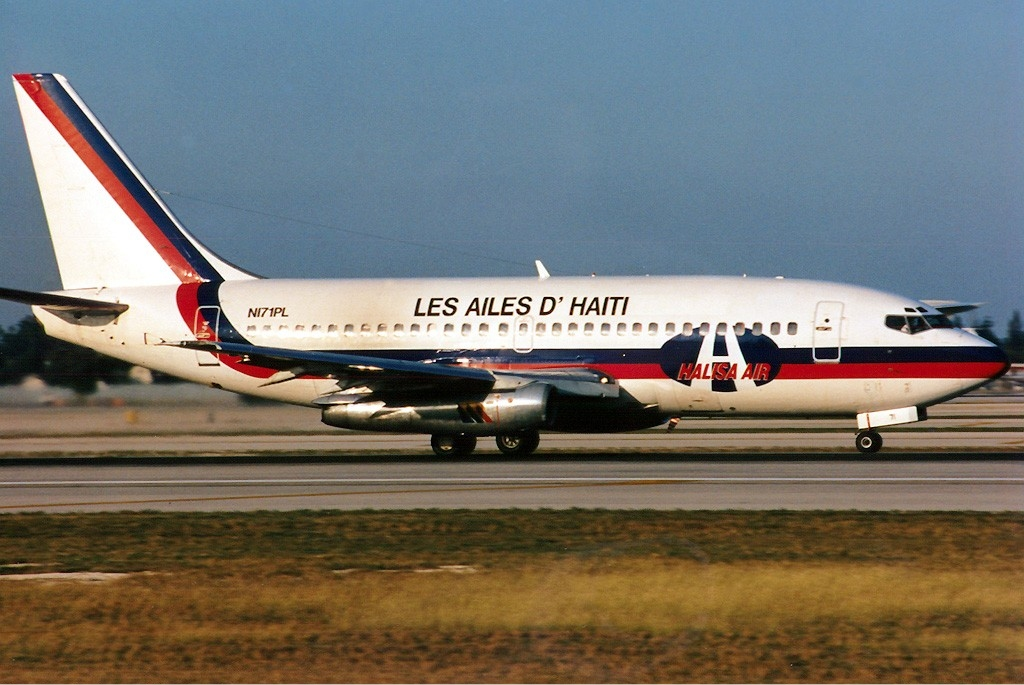
- A Halisa Air Boeing 737-200
IATA	ICAO	Call sign
WD	HBC	Halisa
- Commenced operations: 1991
- Ceased operations: 1998
- Operating bases: Toussaint Louverture International Airport
- Fleet size: 4
- Destinations: Miami International Airport
- Headquarters: Port-au-Prince, Haiti
- Key people: Frantz Cheron

Halisa Air (IATA: WD, ICAO: HBC, call sign: Halisa) was an airline from Haiti, which was operational from 1991 to 1998.

== Company history ==
Halisa Air (Haitian Aviation Line SA) was founded in April 1994 by Frantz Cheron. It operated mostly between Port-au-Prince, Toussaint Louverture International Airport (PAP) and Miami International Airport (MIA). It was a passenger charter operator. It is unclear when Halisa Air stopped flying.

== Fleet details ==
- 2- Boeing 727-224F registration N6673Z
- 1- Boeing 727-251 registration N260US
- 1- Boeing 737-2L9 registration N171PL

All aircraft were leased.
