= Tatarstan Airlines Flight 363 =

2013 aircraft accident in Kazan, Russia

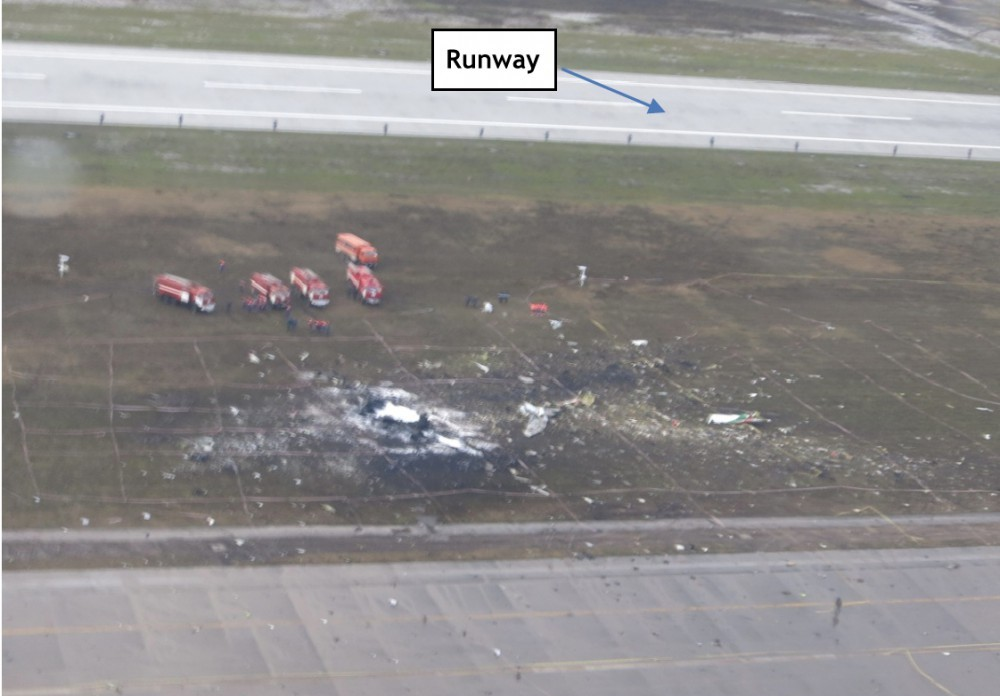
- Aerial view of the crash site

Accident
- Date: 17 November 2013
- Summary: Crashed during aborted landing following spatial disorientation
- Site: Kazan International Airport, Kazan, Russia; 55°36′32″N 49°16′37″E

Aircraft
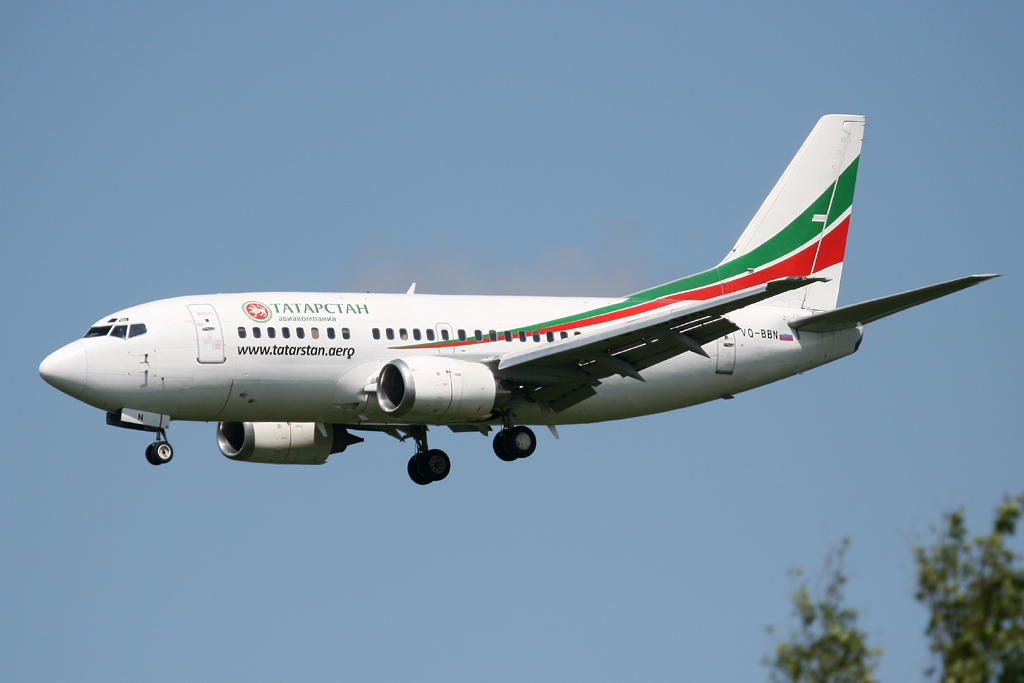
- VQ-BBN, the aircraft involved in the accident, photographed in 2011
- Aircraft type: Boeing 737-53A
- Operator: Tatarstan Airlines
- IATA flight No.: U9363
- ICAO flight No.: TAK363
- Call sign: TATARSTAN 363
- Registration: VQ-BBN
- Flight origin: Domodedovo International Airport, Moscow, Russia
- Destination: Kazan International Airport, Kazan, Russia
- Occupants: 50
- Passengers: 44
- Crew: 6
- Fatalities: 50
- Survivors: 0

Tatarstan Airlines Flight 363 was a scheduled domestic passenger flight, operated by Tatarstan Airlines on behalf of Ak Bars Aero, from Moscow to Kazan, Russia. On 17 November 2013, at 19:24 local time (UTC+4), the Boeing 737-500 crashed during an aborted landing at Kazan International Airport, killing all 44 passengers and 6 crew members on board.

According to the official investigation report by the Interstate Aviation Committee (IAC), the crash was a result of pilot error, arising from a lack of skill to recover from an excessive nose-up attitude during a go-around procedure. The pilots' deficiencies were caused by a problem with the airline's safety management and a lack of regulatory oversight. One member of the commission filed an alternative opinion report, however, claiming that the commission had ignored the possible malfunction of the aircraft's elevator controls.

== Background ==
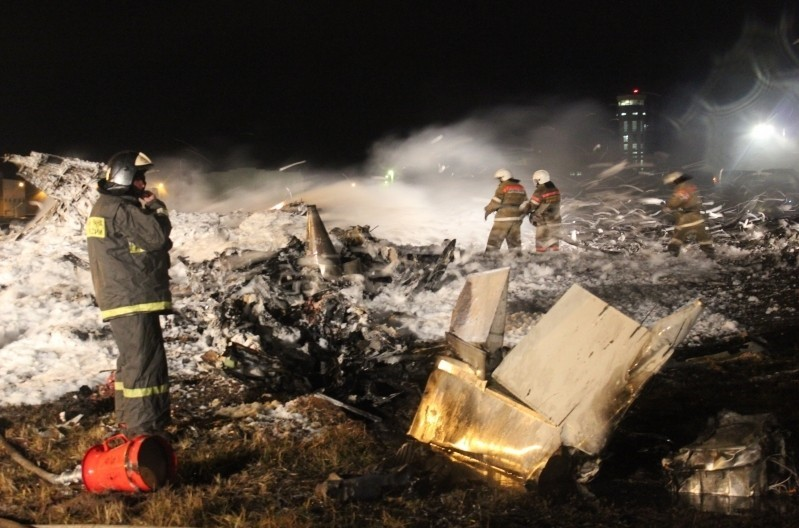
Remains of the plane the night after the accident

The plane operating Tatarstan Airlines Flight 363, with the registration of VQ-BBN, had been built in the year 1990. This plane was previously leased from Bulgaria Air in 2008, prior to which it had been leased by Euralair, Air France, Uganda Airlines, Rio Sul Airlines, and Blue Air.

=== Aircraft ===
The Boeing 737-53A, registration number VQ-BBN, had been in service for more than 23 years.

The airframe had been involved in two prior incidents:

1. While in service with Rio Sul, on 17 December 2001, the aircraft crashed about 70 metres (230 ft) short of the runway while landing at Tancredo Neves International Airport under adverse weather conditions, damaging its landing gear. All 108 passengers and crew on board survived.
2. On 26 November 2012, the aircraft made an emergency landing in Kazan due to problems with cabin depressurization shortly after takeoff.

=== Crew ===
The captain was 47-year-old Rustem Gabdrakhmanovich Salikhov (Russian: Рустем Габдрахманович Салихов), who had been with the airline since 1992. He had 2,755 flight hours, including 2,509 hours on the Boeing 737, 527 of them as a captain. He had also served as a navigator from 1991 to 2010. After that, he became a captain after training in the Boeing 737. The captain had a limited knowledge of the English language. The first officer was Viktor Nikiforovich Gutsul (Russian: Виктор Никифорович Гуцул), who was also 47. He had been with the airline since 2008 and had 2,093 flight hours, with 1,943 of them on the Boeing 737. Gutsul used to be a flight engineer from 1989 to 2008.

== Accident ==
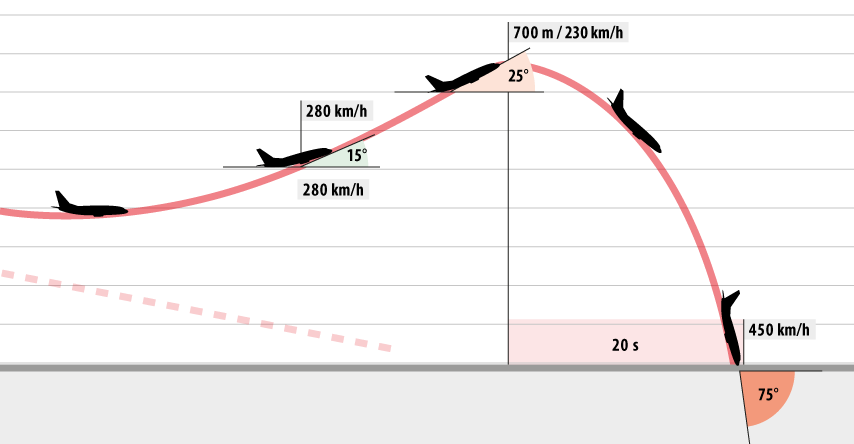
Crash profile

Flight 363 took off from Domodedovo International Airport in Moscow at 6:25 p.m. local time, destined for Kazan International Airport, some 800 kilometres (500 mi; 430 nmi) east of Moscow.

While on final approach to Kazan International Airport, the crew initiated a go-around due to an unstable approach but crashed onto the runway in a 75-degree-nose-down attitude, at a speed of 242 knots (448 km/h; 278 mph) moments later and exploded upon impact with the ground. A second explosion occurred 40 seconds after impact. One of the airport's surveillance cameras caught the crash on video. All 44 passengers and 6 crew members were killed; there were no casualties on the ground. High winds and cloudy conditions were reported at the airport at the time of the crash.

Footage of the aircraft crashing

The Kazan International Airport was kept closed for about 24 hours, serving only transit flights, before it was fully reopened on 18 November.

== Victims ==
Nationality	Passengers	Crew	Total
Russia	42	6	48
United Kingdom	1	—N/a	1
Ukraine	1	—N/a	1
Total	44	6	50

The full list of the passengers and crew was published by the Ministry of Emergency Situations. One of the victims was Irek Minnikhanov, the son of the incumbent President of the Republic of Tatarstan, Rustam Minnikhanov.

== Investigation ==
The IAC launched an investigation into the crash and arrived at the site on 18 November. Both flight recorders, the flight data recorder (FDR) and the cockpit voice recorder (CVR), were recovered from the wreckage. The Tatarstan Transport Prosecution Office opened a criminal investigation into the crash. The American National Transportation Safety Board (NTSB) dispatched a team of investigators to the crash site.

On 19 November, Aksan Giniyatullin, the director of Tatarstan Airlines, declared that although the cockpit crew was experienced, the captain of the airliner may have lacked experience performing a go-around maneuver. Moments before the crash the pilot informed the control tower that the aircraft was not properly configured for landing and initiated a go-around, before plunging into the ground as if it had stalled. Investigators said the possible causes of the accident included technical malfunction as well as pilot error.

On 22 November, the British Air Accidents Investigation Branch (AAIB) announced they had joined the investigation and dispatched investigators to Kazan.

=== Official reports ===
According to the criminal case report, released 14 November 2019 by the Investigative Committee of Russia, the investigation determined the crash was a direct result of erroneous actions on the part of the captain (Salikhov) and the first officer (Gutsul). Based on information obtained during the investigation, Salikhov was lacking sufficient piloting skills and was granted piloting on a basis of falsified documents.

On 19 November 2013, the Investigation Board of the IAC reported the following preliminary details after recovering some information from the flight data recorder:

Tatarstan Airlines Boeing 737-500 Accident Technical Investigation Board of IAC informs about preliminary results of flight data recorder information recovery.

During the final approach, the flight crew were unable to follow a standard landing pattern defined by the regulating documentation. Having realized the aircraft was not lined-up properly relative to the runway, the crew reported to the ATC and started a go-around using the TOGA (take off / go around) mode. One of the two autopilots, which was active during the final approach, had been switched off and the flight was being controlled manually.

The engines reached thrust level close to full. The crew retracted the flaps from 30 degrees to 15 degrees.

Affected by the upturn moment generated by the engine thrust, the aircraft started to climb, reaching a pitch angle of about 25 degrees. Indicated airspeed started to decrease. The crew retracted the landing gear. From initiating the go-around maneuver up to this moment, the crew did not perform control actions through the yoke.

After the airspeed decreased from 150 to 125 knots (278 to 232 km/h; 173 to 144 mph), the crew started control actions through the yoke, pitching the nose down, which stopped the climb then started a descent with increasing airspeed. Maximum angles of attack have not exceeded operational limits during the flight.

After reaching an altitude of 700 metres (2,300 ft), the aircraft started a steep nosedive, with the pitch angle reaching −75° by the end of the flight (end of the recording).

The aircraft collided with terrain at high speed (exceeding 450 km/h (240 kn; 280 mph)) and with highly negative pitch angle.

About 45 seconds had passed between the start of the go-around maneuver and the moment the recording stopped, the descent took about 20 seconds.

The propulsion systems were operating up to the collision with terrain. No single commands have been detected by the preliminary analysis, which would indicate failure of systems or units on the aircraft or engines.

=== Final report ===
On 24 December 2015, the IAC released their final report stating that the crash was caused by an under-qualified crew who lacked the skills to recover from an excessive nose up attitude during a go-around procedure. The go-around was necessitated by a positional error in the navigation system—a map drift. The pilots' deficiencies were caused by lack of airline safety management and lack of regulators' oversight.

According to the final report, during the final approach the crew initiated a go-around, but being under high workload, which possibly caused a "tunnel vision effect", they did not perceive warning messages related to auto-pilot disconnection. When the plane climbed to 700 m, its pitch angle reached 25 degrees and the airspeed dropped to 230 km/h. At that moment the captain, who had not performed a go-around outside of training, moved the yoke, pitching nose down, which stopped the climb and started a descent and an increase in the aircraft's airspeed. After reaching the altitude of 700 m, the aircraft started a steep nosedive, with the pitch angle reaching −75° on ground impact. The plane crashed on the airport's runway with a speed exceeding 450 km/h. The time from the start of the go-around maneuver until the impact was about 45 seconds, including 20 seconds of descent.

=== Alternative opinion report ===
Nikolay Studenikin, the official representative of the Rosaviatsiya in the air accident investigation commission, filed an alternative opinion report, in which he expressed his disagreement with the conclusions of the commission.

In it he stated that the IAC commission concentrated the investigation on the search of the shortcomings in the flight crew training in Russia, and that no direct connection between such shortcomings and the Flight 363 crash was actually established. He also criticized, that the investigation into the possible malfunction of the aircraft's elevators' controls was entrusted to their manufacturer, the US-based Parker Aerospace, which ruled that their controls operated normally during the accident. According to Studenikin, a flight simulation of the crashed flight, which was conducted on the Boeing facilities, was aimed only on proving the crew's fault and didn't simulate a possible mechanical failure in the Boeing aircraft.

=== Aircraft certificate suspension ===
Rosaviatsiya refused to accept the results of the IAC's Flight 363 accident investigation, citing their concern over the Boeing 737's elevator controls. The IAC suggested that the position by Rosaviatsiya was caused by its reluctance to accept the shortcomings of its own regulatory oversight of pilot training in Russia, which was revealed in the report. On 4 November 2015, the IAC unexpectedly announced the suspension of Boeing 737 flying certificates in Russia, explaining it by Rosaviatsiya's refusal to accept the absence of safety issues with 737 elevator controls.

With the Boeing 737 being a work-horse of several Russian airlines, the suspension meant that within days a significant part of the country's passenger fleet could be grounded for an uncertain period of time. Dmitry Peskov, a spokesman for the Russian President, said that the Kremlin was aware of the IAC decision to suspend Boeing 737 operation in Russia and believed that the specialized agencies and the Cabinet would make the necessary analysis of the situation. The Ministry of Transport said that only 6 out of 150 Boeing 737 aircraft in Russia had their certificates issued by the IAC, while the rest got their certificates in other countries, and thus the IAC had no right to suspend them. Rosaviatsiya announced that the IAC had no right to ban any Boeing 737 operation in Russia, as such a decision could be made only by the federal executive bodies. It called an emergency meeting to discuss the future of Boeing 737s in Russia with the participation of the Ministry of Transport, Rostransnadzor, airline representatives, and a Boeing representative in Russia, but the IAC refused to attend it. The next day the IAC withdrew its suspension of Boeing 737 certificates.

On 10 December 2015, the IAC met and officially accepted its Flight 363 final accident investigation report. Rosaviatsiya and Studenikin refused to participate in the meeting or provide their approval for the report.

== Aftermath ==
In early December 2013, Russia's Federal Air Transport Agency recommended that the airline's certificate should be revoked. The revocation was announced on 31 December 2013, and the company's aircraft were transferred to Ak Bars Aero.

== See also ==
- Aeroflot Flight 821 – Another 737-500 that also crashed in similar circumstances in 2008
- Flydubai Flight 981 – a Boeing 737 crashed in similar circumstances in 2016
