= Lisa, Ogun State =

Lisa Lisa Igbore
- Village
- Location of Lisa in Nigeria
- Coordinates: 6°49′9.255″N 3°11′34.908″E
- Country: Nigeria
- State: Ogun State
- LGA: Ifo

Government
  - Type: Monarchy
  - Chief: Najeem Oladele Odugbemi
- Time zone: UTC+1 (WAT)
- ZIP code: 112104

Lisa is a small village located in Ifo Local Government Area of Ogun State, Nigeria. Occupied immensely by the Egba people, the village rely mainly on farming as a means of survival. On 22 October 2005, Lisa came into worldwide recognition after a Boeing 737-200 aircraft crashed in the village killing all 117 people on board.
