= Per Frantzen =

Norwegian footballer (1920-2005)

Personal information
- Date of birth: 17 July 1920
- Place of birth: Bergen, Norway
- Date of death: 10 October 2005 (aged 85)
- Position: Midfielder

International career
Years	Team	Apps	(Gls)
1946	Norway	1	(0)

Per Frantzen (17 July 1920 – 10 October 2005) was a Norwegian footballer. He played in one match for the Norway national football team in 1946.
