= Sonny Fisher =

American singer-songwriter

Therman "Sonny" Fisher (November 13, 1931 in Chandler, Texas – October 8, 2005 in Houston, Texas) was an American rockabilly singer, songwriter, and guitarist. His career overlapped with another Texas-based rock 'n' roll musician, Benny Joy.

He was inducted into the Rockabilly Hall of Fame .
