= Bellview, Georgia =

Unincorporated community in Georgia, U.S.

Coordinates: 31°09′27″N 84°35′58″W

Bellview is an unincorporated community in Miller County, in the U.S. state of Georgia.

== History ==
A variant name was "Bait". A post office called Bait was established in 1887, and remained in operation until 1907. In 1900, the community had 27 inhabitants.
