= Micaela Portilla =

Spanish anthropologist

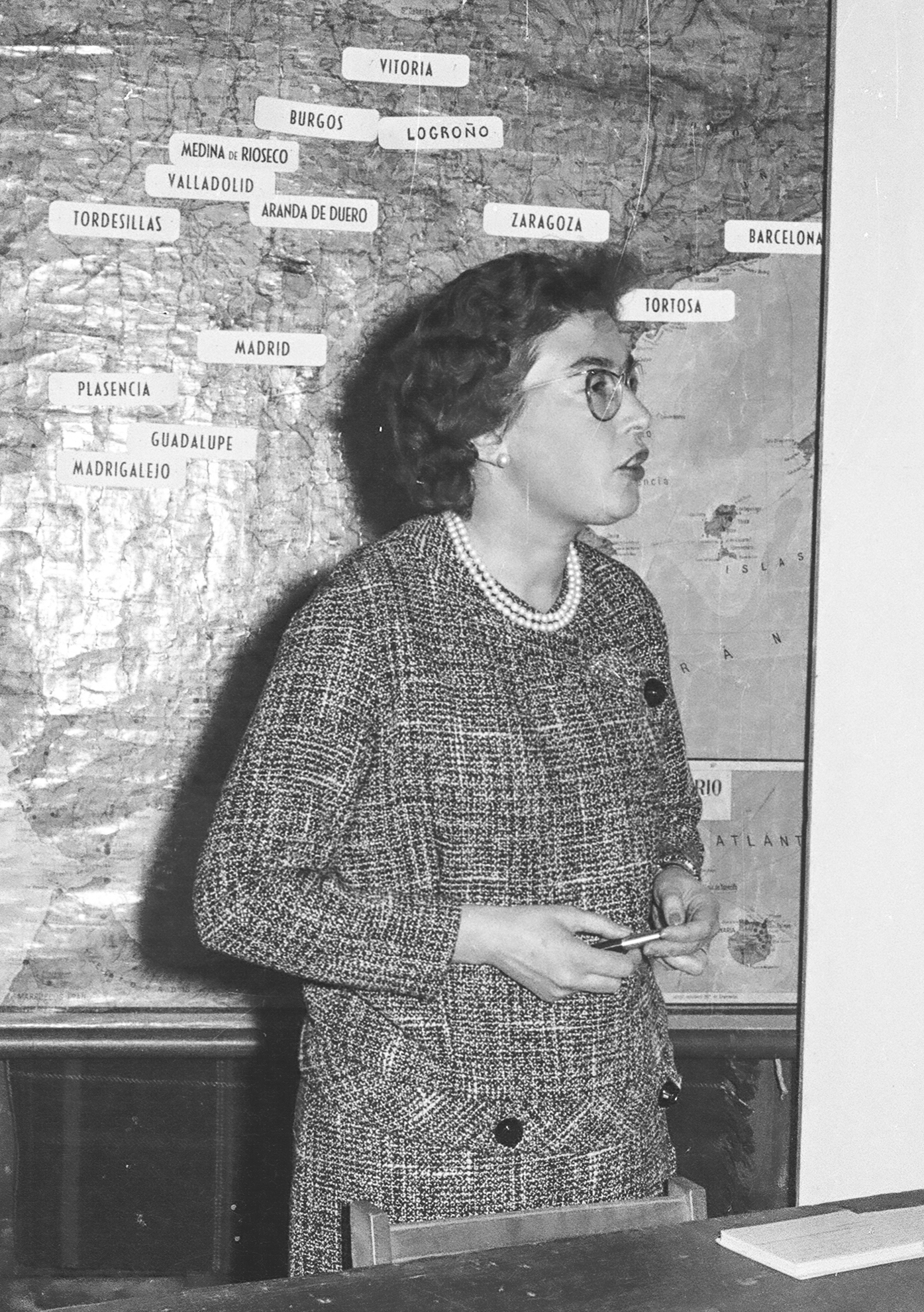
- Born: July 1922; Vitoria, Spain
- Died: 8 October 2005 (aged 83); Vitoria, Spain
- Education: Complutense University
- Occupations: Anthropologist, historian
- Known for: Historical studies of Basque Country

Micaela Portilla (1922–2005) was a Spanish anthropologist and historian. She was born in Vitoria, Basque Country in July 1922 and died there on 8 October 2005. She was an important Basque anthropologist and historian, having led many studies and other works in these fields through more sensitive and comprehensive methodological work. She created a school of followers in the province of Álava.

== Education and career ==
Micaela Portilla completed her first studies at the Colegio del Niño Jesús in Vitoria and in 1933 went to the secondary school in the same city. She studied Teaching in 1941 and later Philosophy and Letters.

Portilla began her professional career as an elementary and vocational school teacher in various locations in the province of Álava (Aramaiona and Salvatierra) and finally in Vitoria. She later extended her studies at the Complutense University, majoring in Geography and History. For her thesis in 1954, she presented a work entitled Torres de Mendozas, Guevaras y Ayalas en Álava (The towers of Mendoza, Guevara and Ayala in Álava), which established a starting point for her investigative work later.

In the words of Henrike Knörr, professor of Basque philology, Portilla was not only an outstanding historian but was also a great disseminator who was always full of enthusiasm. Her explanations about old roads (very important in Portilla's work), "about hermitages still standing or that have disappeared, about stonecutters or carvers, about lineages. There was great wisdom and a special gift for explaining all this news to people, with an incomparable pedagogical sense."

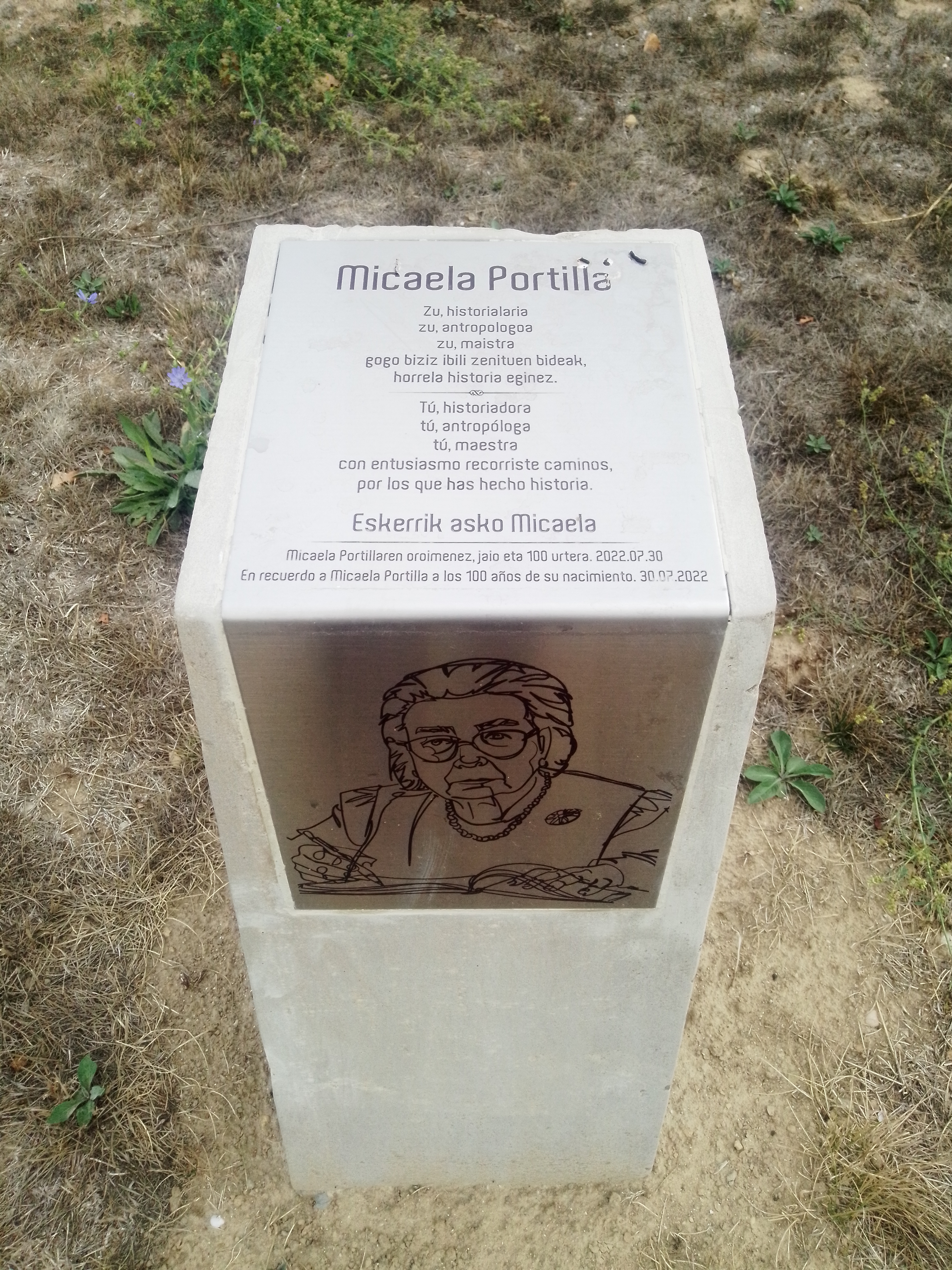
Commemorative plaque in Fontecha, Basque Country

She was a corresponding member of the Royal Academies of Fine Arts and History, and she was the first woman to receive an honorable doctorate from the University of the Basque Country.

The importance of her ethnographic contributions is such that the Basque organization, Eusko Ikaskuntza, and the Real Sociedad de Amigos (Royal Society of Friends) of the Basque Country organized a conference in her honor in February 2007 with the participation of the Sancho el Sabio Foundation, the Provincial Council of Álava and the City Council of Vitoria.

== Selected works ==
Micaela Portilla's documentary work and editorial legacy contains thousands of pages and over a hundred publications, some of which are:

- Torres de Mendozas, Guevaras y Ayalas en Álava (1954) - The towers of Mendoza, Guevara and Ayala in Álava.
- El retablo de San Blas de Hueto Abajo (Álava) (1958) - The altarpiece of San Blas de Hueto Abajo.
- Torres y casas fuertes de Álava (1978) - Towers and fortified houses in Alava.
- Una ruta europea. Por Álava a Compostela. Del paso de San Adrián al Ebro (1991) - A European route. From Álava to Compostela. From the San Adrian de Ebro passage.
- Catálogo Monumental. Diócesis de Vitoria (9 volumes) (1967-2007) - Monumental Catalog. Diocese of Vitoria.

== Awards and recognition ==
- Lekuona Manuel Award (1997)
- Art History Studies Paper in memory of Professor Michelle Portilla (Jose Javier Velez Chaurri, Pedro Luis Echeverria Goñi and Felicitas Martínez Salinas Entertainment), Department of Culture of the Provincial Council of Alava (2009) ISBN 9788478217182
- Lan Onari distinction granted by the Basque Government in 2000 in recognition of her professional work.
- In 2017, the Micaela Portilla Research Center of the UPV/EHU was inaugurated.
- Documentary film about Portilla (2022).
