= The Aviation Herald =

Aviation accident and incident news website

- Website type: Aviation accident and incident reporting
- Available in: English
- Owner: NOMIS SOFT Datenverarbeitung GmbH
- Creator: Simon Hradecky
- Website: avherald.com
- Registration: No
- Launched: 12 May 2008
- Current status: Active

The Aviation Herald is an English-language website that publishes reports of accidents and incidents in commercial aviation. It was launched in 2008 by Austrian technical software developer Simon Hradecky. In May 2018, the website had around 3.5 million visitors per month, and as of January 2020 over 25,000 individual news items had been published. It is sometimes referred to in international mainstream media reports on aviation incidents.

== History ==
The site was launched on 12 May 2008 as a one-man project by Austrian technical software developer Simon Hradecky. Hradecky's search for safety-related incidents in aviation began in 1995, so despite its launch in 2008, reports on events up to 19 June 1999 can be found on the website. The site garnered over 1,000 readers in the first month, and after eight months it had over 100,000. In May 2018, the website had around 3.5 million visitors per month. As of January 2020, over 25,000 individual news items had been published.

== Website ==
The website records incidents that occur during commercial flights (aircraft with at least 19 seats). According to its own statements, the published news is based on its own research and is only included if there are reports from at least one official source or two unofficial, independent sources.

The website, which is visually designed in a no-frills style, lists the headlines of the latest events and news in aviation, all of which fall into one of the following categories:

- Crash (C) – an accident that killed multiple people or caused catastrophic damage
- Accident (A) – an incident that caused injury, death or extensive damage
- Incident (I) – an incident that did not cause injury, death or extensive damage
- News (N) – an article about an event other than a crash, accident or incident
- Report (R) – an article about an accident or incident investigation report where the site did not report the original event.

The user can filter articles by category. The articles are kept up to date even years after an aircraft accident. For example, the final reports of the associated aircraft accident investigations are often incorporated into the original article. Accordingly, the website enables the sorting of articles by "Occurrence" or "Update".

The website also allows comments on articles. These do not require registration; there is a provision for an optional email address and screen name.

When an event report is launched by the user for display, the website reports the user's IP address. As a result, the site is capable of collecting personal information using the user's email address and IP address. The moderator/owner of the site has the ability to block submissions from a particular IP address for any reason, which may be done indiscriminately.

== Reception ==
The Aviation Herald was included in a 2012 CNN article on "aviation geeks". In 2016, it was described by Reuters as "a respected independent website monitoring air accidents" and by The New Zealand Herald as a "highly respected website". It is sometimes referred to in international mainstream media reports on aviation incidents.

On 3 December 2012, The Aviation Herald reported on a risky landing made by a Ryanair plane at Allgäu Airport Memmingen, Germany, in September. A day later, Ryanair made a legal threat of defamation against the website in response to critical reader comments below the article. The airline subsequently withdrew its threat six days later, according to the website.

The portal came under criticism following the crash of Azerbaijan Airlines Flight 8243, where even days later, the shooting down of the aircraft, which was considered safe, was dismissed as 'anti-Russian agitation and anti-Russian propaganda'.

The portal also came under criticism when, around the 10th anniversary of the crash of Germanwings Flight 9525, the operator published theories that most experts considered implausible or conspiracy theories. According to Simon Hradecky's theories, contrary to the fact-based findings of the air accident investigators, First Officer Andreas Lubitz may not have been to blame for the crash. Instead, a computer error automatically triggered the Airbus's descent, at the same moment the pilot in the cockpit lost consciousness and the other pilot was unable to return to the cockpit because the panel for entering the access code was defective. Hradecky also suggests that it may not have been Andreas Lubitz at all, but the captain who was alone in the cockpit at the time of the crash. Renowned experts and Düsseldorf public prosecutor Christoph Kumpa have dismissed such speculation as 'conspiracy theories' and reiterate that there is no doubt about Andreas Lubitz's actions. Austrian aviation expert and author Patrick Huber also refuted Hradecky's main argument that the altitude adjustment on the FCU from 38,000 to 100 feet could not have been made within a second, with a video showing exactly that. German aviation journalist David Haße, editor of the portal 'Airliners.de', demonstrated that Hradecky even contradicts himself in his argumentation and that it is therefore inconclusive.
