= Bellview Airlines =

Nigerian airline

Bellview
| IATA | ICAO | Call sign |
|---|---|---|
| assigned to different airlines Bhutan Airlines | BLV | BELLVIEW AIRLINES |
- Founded: 1992
- Ceased operations: 2009
- Hubs: Murtala Mohammed International Airport
- Focus cities: Nnamdi Azikiwe International Airport; Port Harcourt International Airport; Cairo International Airport; Julius Nyerere International Airport
- Frequent-flyer program: Premium Club
- Fleet size: 21 (When ceased operation)
- Parent company: Bellview Airlines Nig. Ltd.
- Headquarters: Ikeja, Lagos State, Nigeria
- Key people: Tunde Yusuf (Chairman), Kayode Odukoya (CEO)
- Website: https://web.archive.org/*/http://www.flybellviewair.com/

Bellview Airlines was an airline headquartered at Bellview Plaza in Ikeja, Lagos State, Nigeria. Founded in 1992 and having had 308 employees, it operated scheduled passenger flights within Africa as well as international flights to London Heathrow Airport; Amsterdam Airport Schiphol; Dubai International Airport; Madrid–Barajas Airport; Düsseldorf Airport and Madrid–Barajas Airport out of Murtala Mohammed International Airport, Lagos. The airline was shut down in 2009.

== History ==
In 1992, Bellview Airlines emerged from Bellview Travels Limited, a Lagos-based travel agency, originally concentrating on offering executive charter services using a single Yakovlev Yak-40 aircraft. In 1993 scheduled domestic passenger services commenced with a leased Douglas DC-9-30. In order to expand further, a subsidiary in Sierra Leone was founded in 1995, which later merged back into its parent company.

The Government of Nigeria set a deadline of April 30, 2007, for all airlines operating in the country to re-capitalise to avoid being grounded, in an effort to ensure better services and safety. Bellview Airlines satisfied the criteria of the Nigerian Civil Aviation Authority (NCAA) and was subsequently re-registered for operation .

In October 2009, Bellview Airlines ceased operations after the International Air Transport Association (IATA) suspended the airline from its Billing and Settlement Plan (BSP) system. The suspension followed the grounding of Bellview’s domestic and regional flights due to a lack of aircraft. The airline announced it was undergoing restructuring and awaiting the delivery of new planes. As a result, ticketing and refund processes were halted, interline partnerships were affected, and passengers with existing bookings faced significant disruption, with no immediate access to refunds through the IATA system.

== Destinations ==
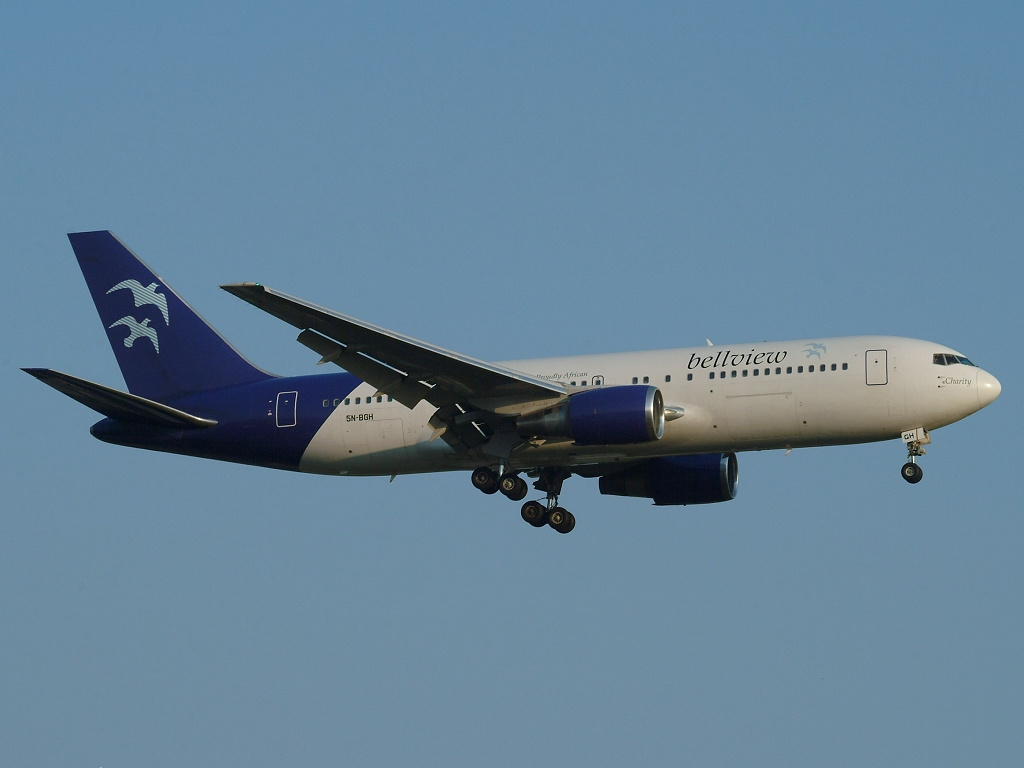
A Boeing 767-200 of Bellview Airlines (named "Charity") on approach of London Heathrow Airport in 2006.

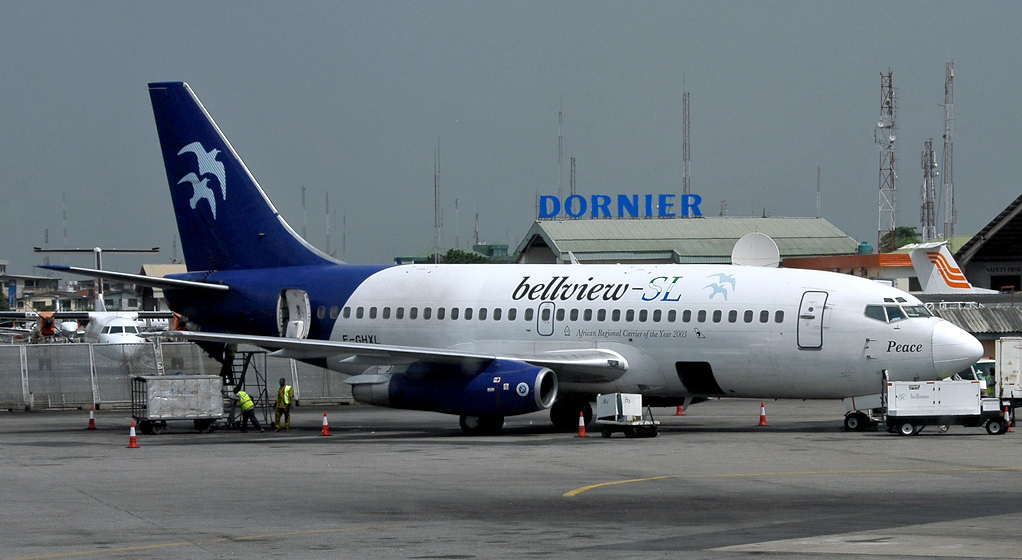
A Bellview Airlines Boeing 737-200 (named "Peace") at Murtala Muhammed International Airport in 2007.

In July 2009, Bellview Airlines offered scheduled flights to the following destinations:

=== Africa ===
- Angola
  - Luanda (Quatro de Fevereiro Airport)
- Cameroon
  - Douala (Douala International Airport)
- Côte d'Ivoire
  - Abidjan (Port Bouet Airport)
- Egypt
  - Cairo (Cairo International Airport) focus city
- Ethiopia
  - Addis Ababa (Bole International Airport)
- Gabon
  - Libreville (Libreville International Airport)
- The Gambia
  - Banjul (Banjul International Airport)
- Ghana
  - Accra (Accra International Airport)
- Guinea
  - Conakry (Conakry International Airport)
- Kenya
  - Nairobi (Jomo Kenyatta International Airport)
- Liberia
  - Monrovia (Roberts International Airport)
- Morocco
  - Marrakesh (Marrakesh Menara Airport)
- Nigeria
  - Abuja (Nnamdi Azikiwe International Airport) focus city
  - Lagos (Murtala Mohammed International Airport) hub
  - Kano (Mallam Aminu Kano International Airport)
  - Port Harcourt (Port Harcourt International Airport) focus city
- Senegal
  - Dakar (Dakar-Yoff-Léopold Sédar Senghor International Airport)
- Sierra Leone
  - Freetown (Lungi International Airport)
- South Africa
  - Johannesburg (O. R. Tambo International Airport)
- Sudan
  - Khartoum (Khartoum International Airport)
- Tanzania
  - Dar es Salaam (Julius Nyerere International Airport focus city
- Tunisia
  - Tunis (Tunis–Carthage International Airport)

=== Europe ===
- United Kingdom
  - London (London Heathrow Airport)
- Germany
  - Düsseldorf (Düsseldorf Airport)
- Netherlands
  - Amsterdam (Amsterdam Airport Schiphol)
- United Arab Emirates
  - Dubai (Dubai International Airport)
- Spain
  - Madrid (Madrid–Barajas Airport)

== Incidents and accidents ==
- On October 22, 2005, Bellview Airlines Flight 210, a Boeing 737-200 aircraft with 117 people on board, crashed shortly after taking off from Murtala Mohammed International Airport en route to Nnamdi Azikiwe International Airport, killing all 117 people on board. Bellview grounded all flights on the next day, but resumed operation again on October 24.
- On December 19, 2005, a Boeing 737 operating a Bellview Airlines flight between Lagos and Freetown made an emergency landing at Accra International Airport in Accra, Ghana due to hydraulical problems. On the following day, Nigerian authorities ordered all Bellview flights to be grounded and suspended the airline's license until December 22.

== Fleet ==
Over the years, Bellview Airlines operated the following aircraft types:
| Aircraft | In service | Retired | Passengers | | | | Notes |
| Aircraft | In service | Retired | F | C | Y | Total | Notes |
|---|---|---|---|---|---|---|---|
| Yakovlev Yak-40 | 1 | 1993 | — | — | — | 24 | The aircraft was sold for parts. |
| Douglas DC-9-30 | 1 | 1998 | 16 | | 84 | 100 | The aircraft was scrapped. |
| Airbus A300-600 | 3 | 2009 | — | 28 | 238 | 266 | Register # 5N-BVU, 5N-BVV, 5N-BVX. |
| Boeing 737-200 | 5 | 2009 | 8 | — | 106 | 114 | One crashed as Flight 210. |
| Boeing 737-300 | 4 | 2009 | 12 | — | 116 | 128 | |
| Boeing 767-200ER | 3 | 2009 | — | 18 | 186 | 204 | Register #'s 5N-BGH-Stored, PP-VNS Sold to Varig Airlines, 5N-BHC-Returned to the lessor. |
| Boeing 767-300ER | 2 | 2009 | 18 | 24 | 178 | 220 | Both aircraft sold to Japan Airlines as J614 and J615. |

== See also ==
- Airlines of Africa
