= Thai Airways International fleet =

List of aircraft operated by Thai Airways International

Thai Airways International operates a fleet of wide-body aircraft from Airbus and Boeing and narrow-body aircraft from Airbus.

== Current fleet ==
As of February 2026, Thai Airways International operates the following aircraft:

Aircraft	In Service	Orders	Passengers						Notes
Aircraft	In Service	Orders	F	C	W	Y	Total	Ref	Notes
Airbus A320-200	20	—	—	—	—	168	168		
Airbus A320-200	20	—	—	—	—	174	174		
Airbus A321neo	1	31	—	16	—	159	175		Deliveries commenced 2025.
Airbus A330-300	6	—	—	31	48	185	264		Three aircraft were acquired from Virgin Atlantic. Four aircraft to be retired by 2033.
Airbus A330-300	6	—	—	31	—	263	294		Three aircraft were acquired from Virgin Atlantic. Four aircraft to be retired by 2033.
Airbus A350-900	23	—	—	32	—	289	321		To be retrofitted with new Royal Silk and Economy cabins, along with the introduction of Economy Plus seats, starting in 2028.
Airbus A350-900	23	—	—	33	—	301	334		To be retrofitted with new Royal Silk and Economy cabins, along with the introduction of Economy Plus seats, starting in 2028.
Airbus A350-900	23	—	—	30	—	309	339		To be retrofitted with new Royal Silk and Economy cabins, along with the introduction of Economy Plus seats, starting in 2028.
Boeing 777-200ER	3	—	—	30	—	262	292		To be retired by 2026.
Boeing 777-300ER	17	—	8	40	—	255	303		To be retrofitted with new Royal Silk and Economy cabins, along with the reintroduction of Economy Plus seats and removal of first class seats, starting in 2027.
Boeing 777-300ER	17	—	—	42	—	306	348		To be retrofitted with new Royal Silk and Economy cabins, along with the reintroduction of Economy Plus seats and removal of first class seats, starting in 2027.
Boeing 787-8	6	10	—	22	—	234	264		Two will be leased to LOT Polish Airlines. Ten former China Southern Airlines aircraft to be leased from Avalon Leasing.
Boeing 787-9	4	42	—	30	—	262	292		Deliveries are planned to begin in 2027 with 35 options. Six orders were converted to 787-10s.
Boeing 787-9	4	42	—	30	—	268	298		Deliveries are planned to begin in 2027 with 35 options. Six orders were converted to 787-10s.
Boeing 787-10	—	6	TBA						Orders were converted from 787-9s.
Total	80	89							

=== Gallery ===
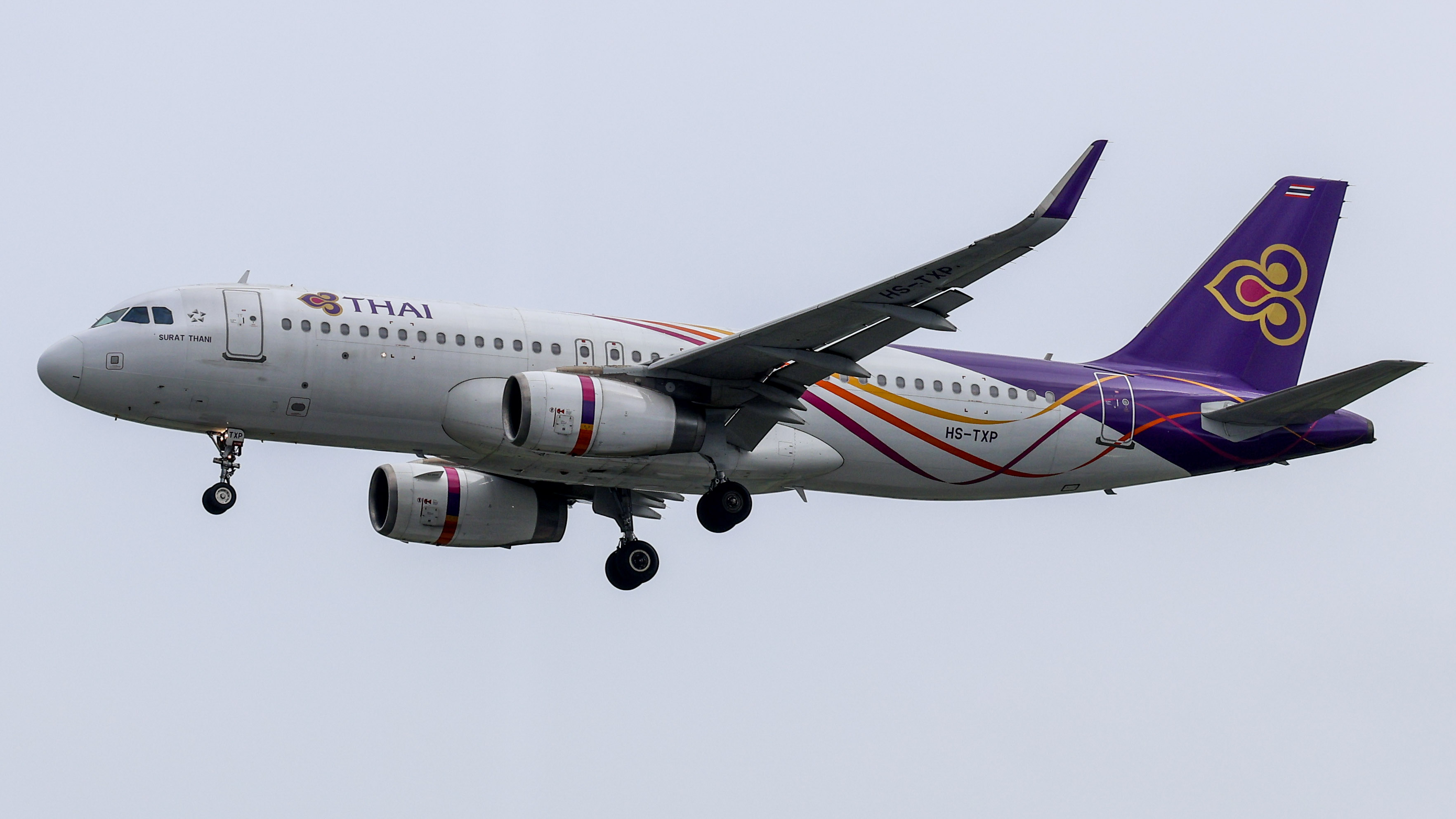
Airbus A320-200

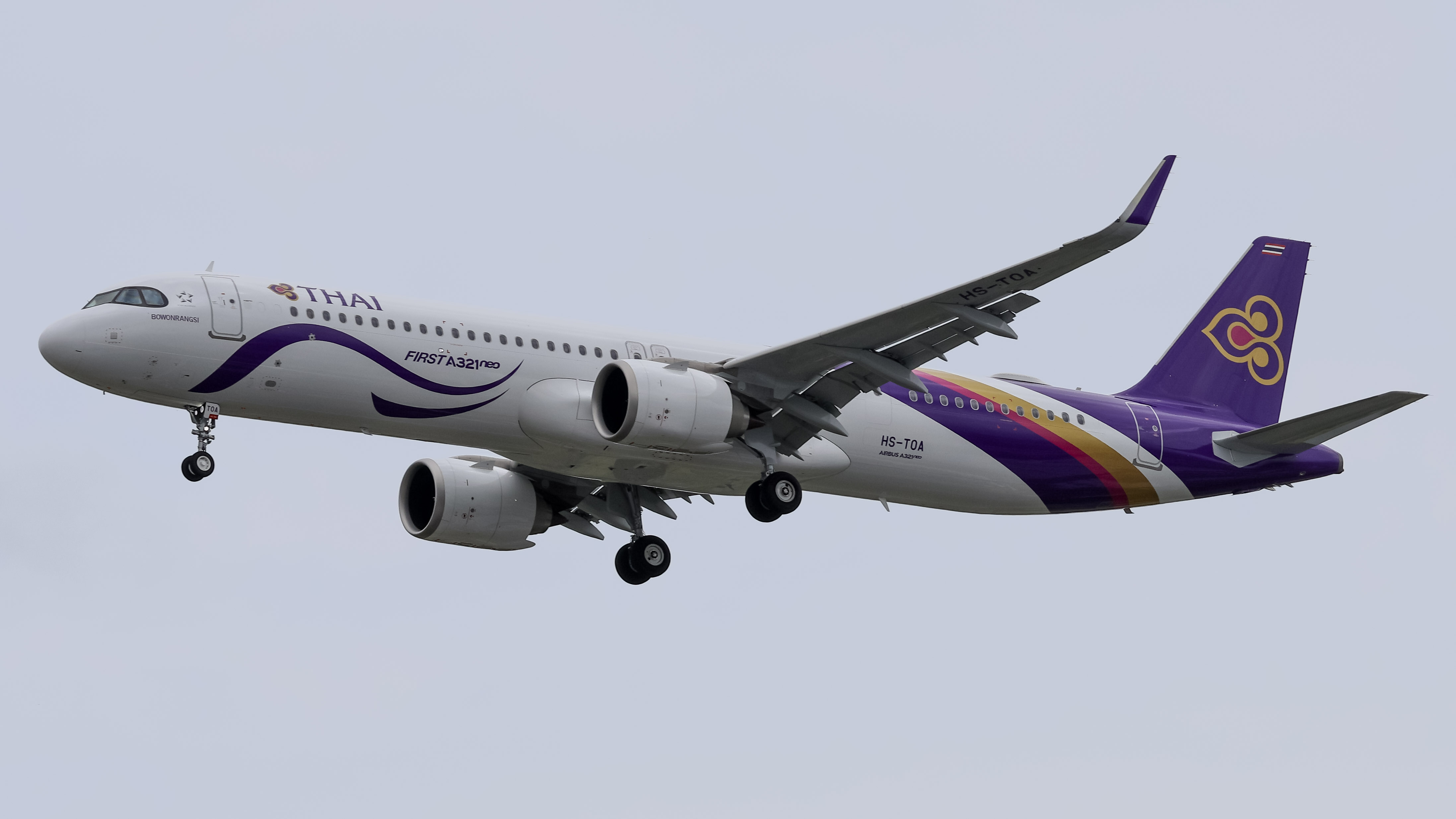
Airbus A321neo

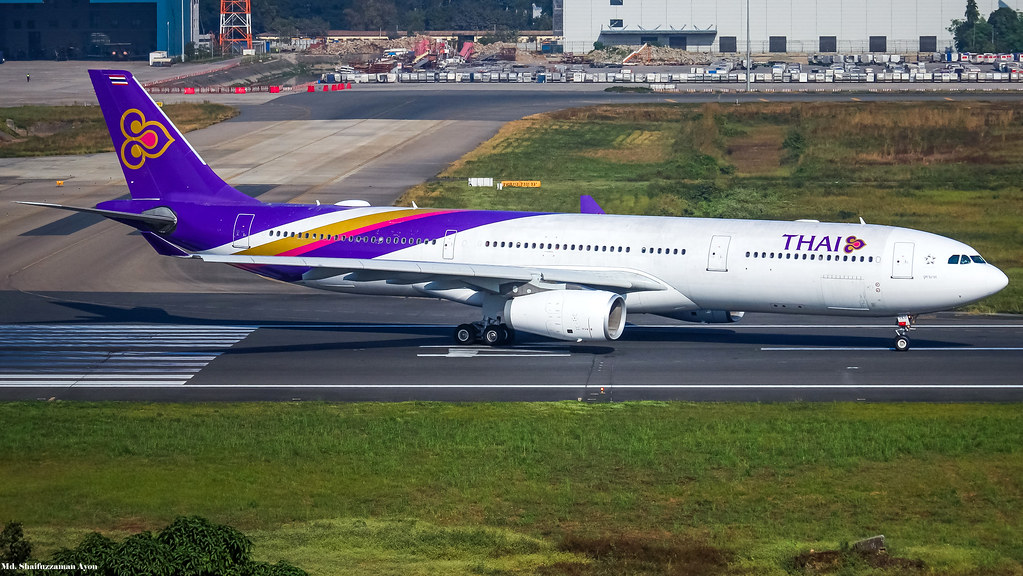
Airbus A330-300

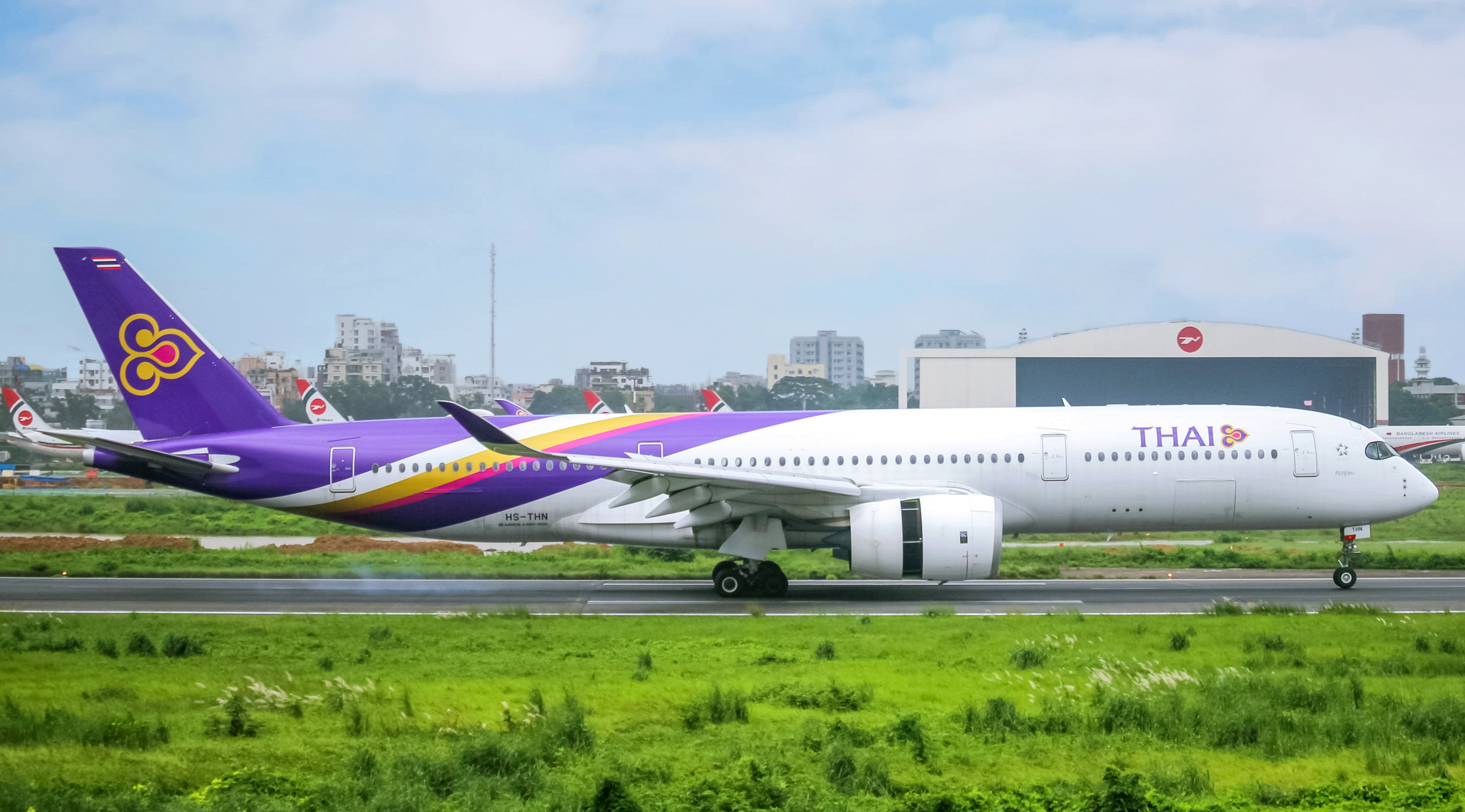
Airbus A350-900

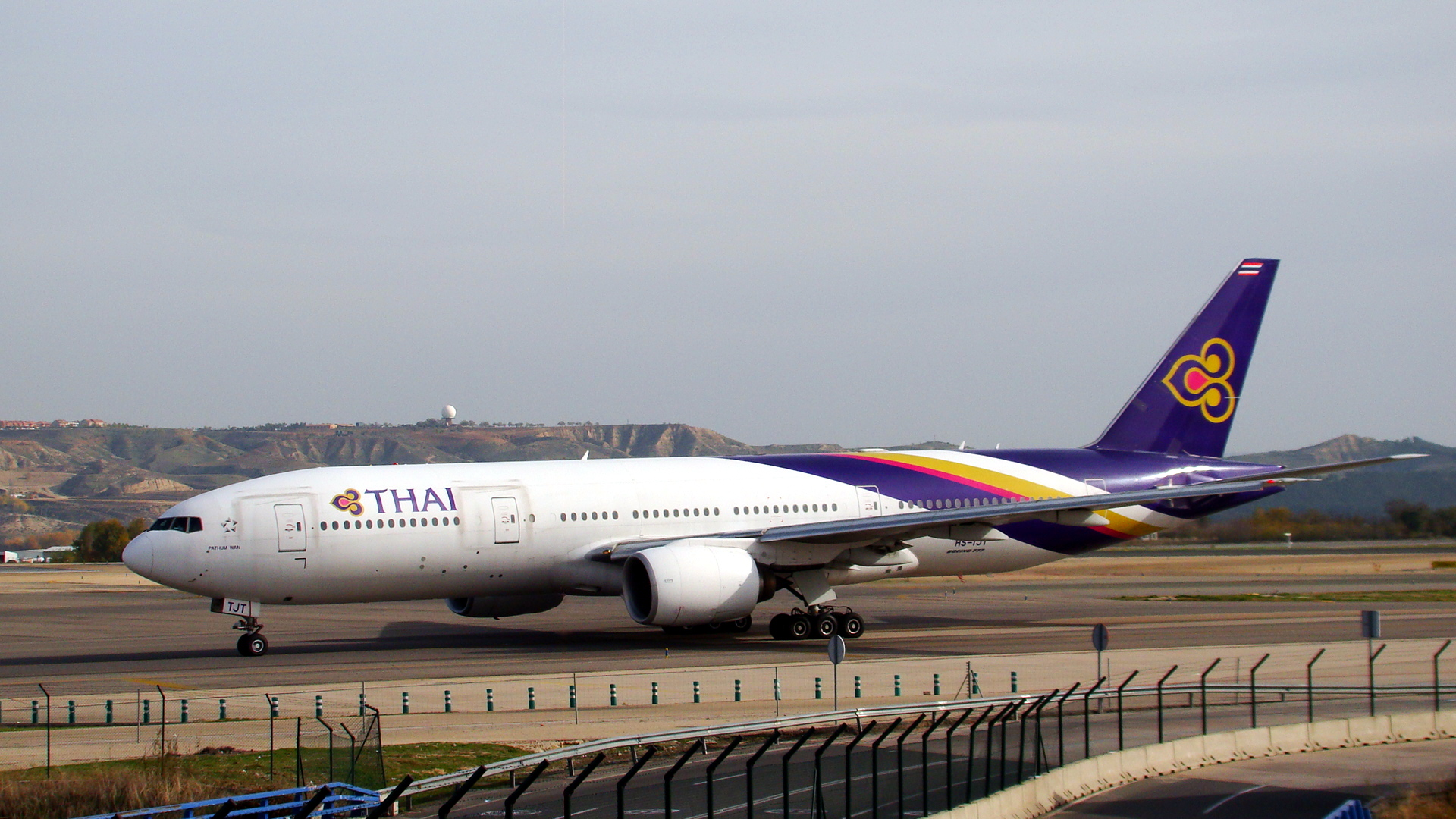
Boeing 777-200ER

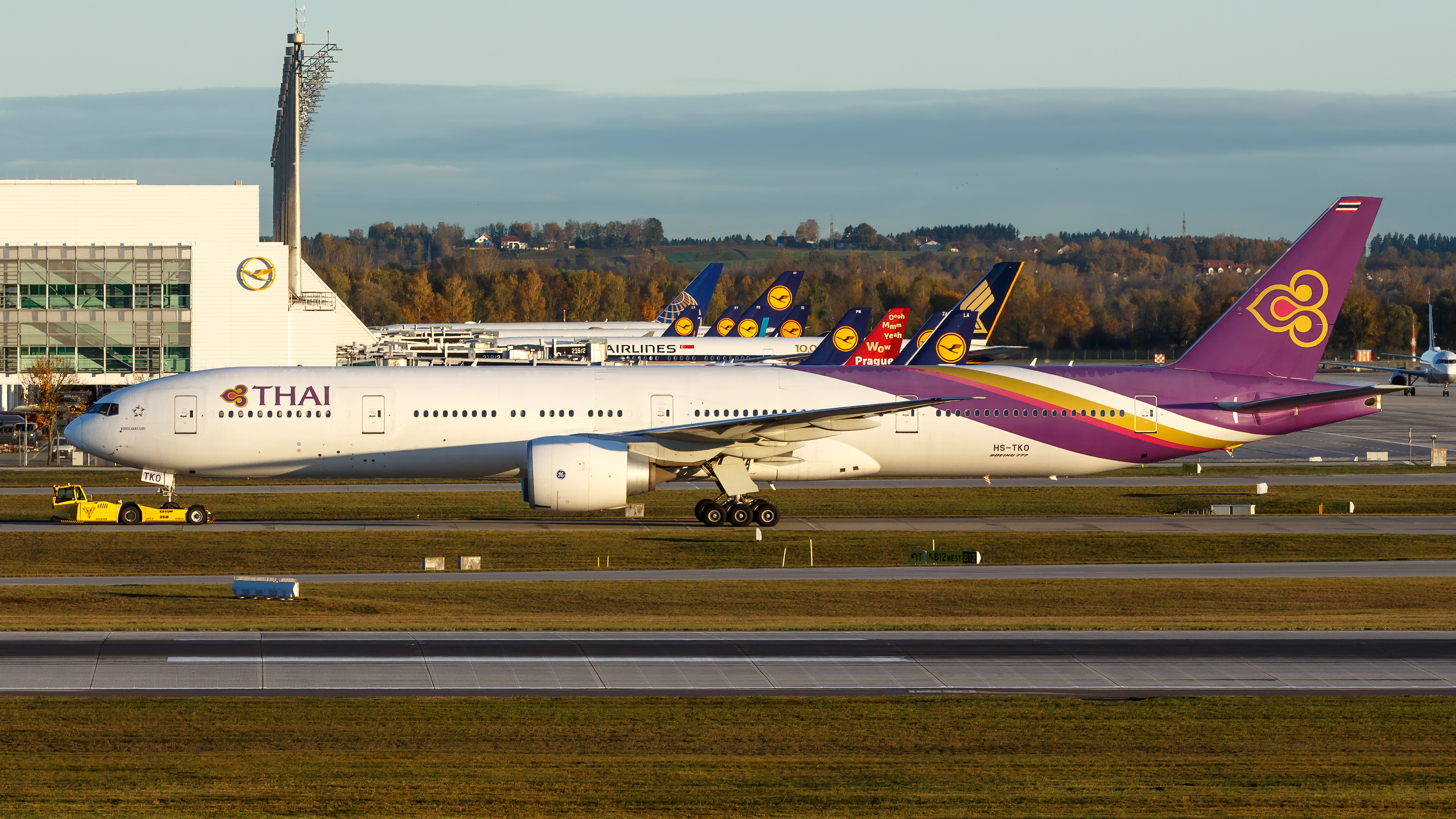
Boeing 777-300ER

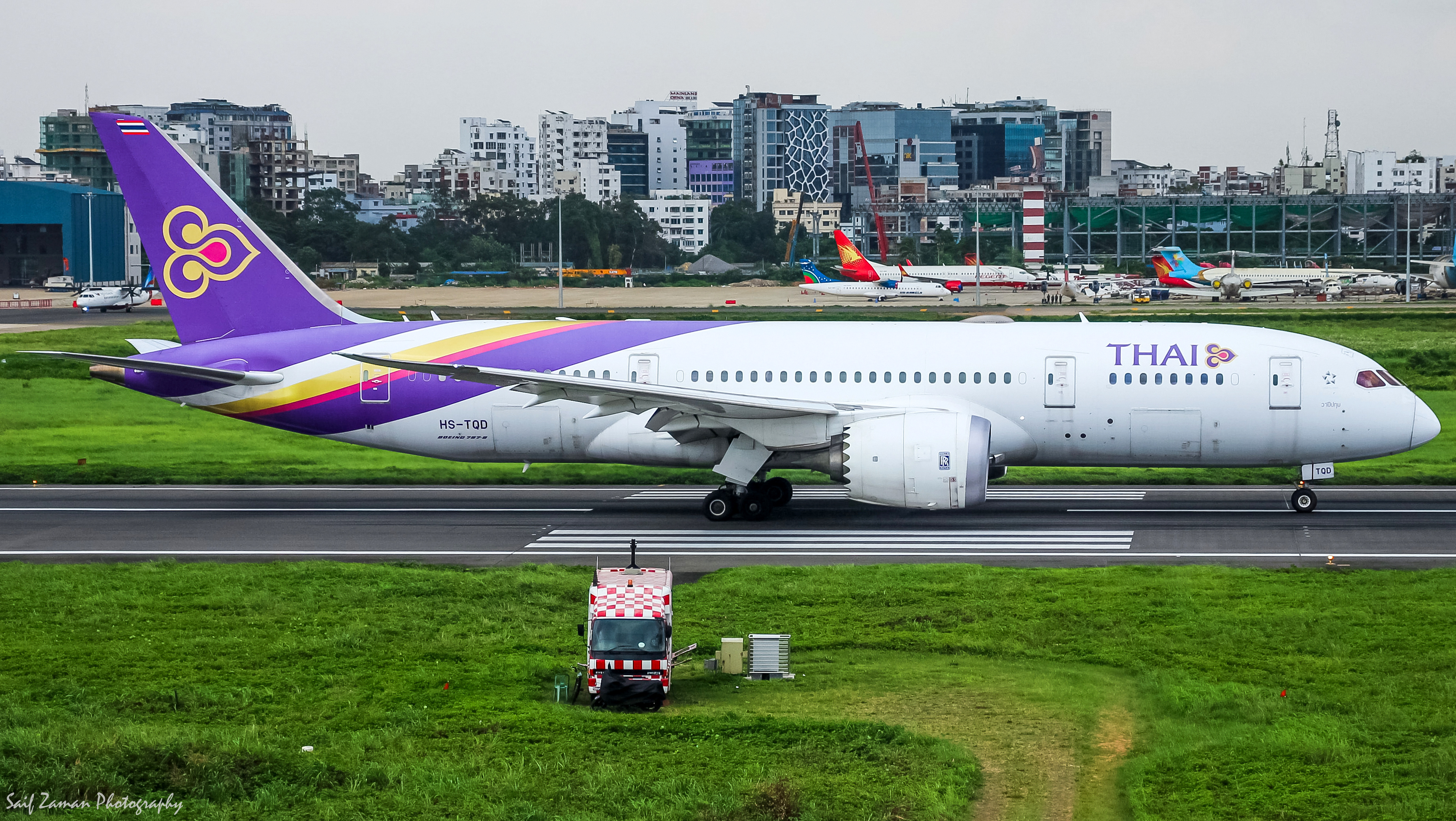
Boeing 787-8

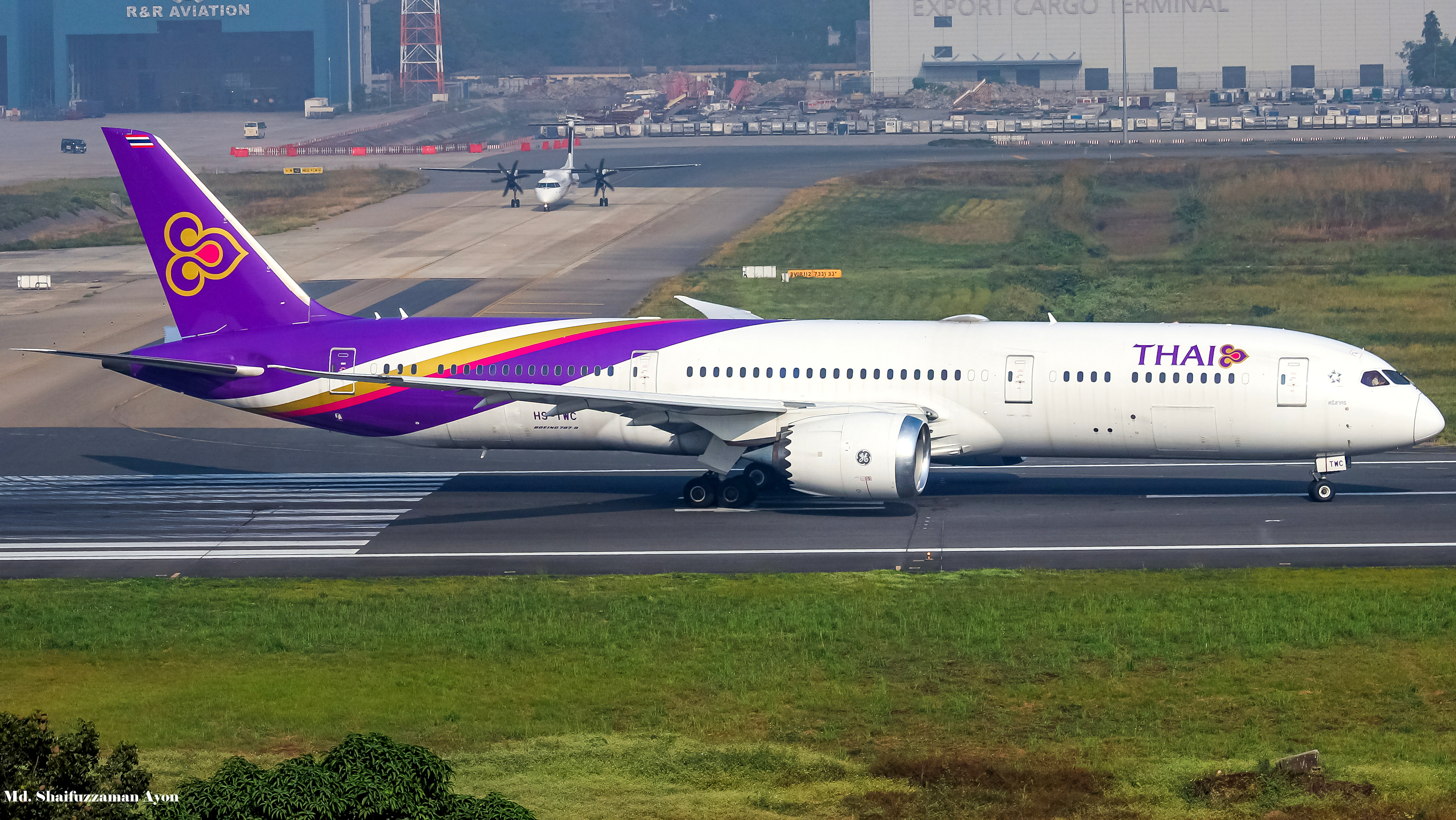
Boeing 787-9

== Fleet development plans ==
=== Airbus A320 ===
Thai Airways took delivery of its first Airbus A320-200 in 2012 to operate for Thai Smile, the airline’s subsidiary whose main role was to serve domestic and short regional flights. In the beginning, the aircraft had an all-economy 3-3 configuration, with the first four front rows sold as Smile Plus Class. During the rehabilitation process of Thai Airways, it was announced that Thai Smile would be merged into the mainline. The aircraft were consecutively transferred to Thai Airways from May 2023 until January 2024, and the retrofit plan was announced later in February 2024. The plan includes installing 12 new business class seats, replacing the former economy seats, arranged in a 2-2 configuration across the first three rows, along with wireless in-flight entertainment. The retrofitted aircraft will primarily operate on domestic routes once the Airbus A321neo has been delivered.

=== Airbus A321neo ===
In February 2024, Thai Airways entered into a lease agreement with AerCap for ten Airbus A321neo aircraft. In addition, the airline finalized a separate agreement with SMBC Aviation Capital for the lease of eight additional A321neos. On 22 April 2025, Thai Airways signed a lease agreement with China Aircraft Leasing Group for nine aircraft, marking the first collaboration between the two companies. The following day, the airline further expanded its fleet through a lease agreement with BOC Aviation for five Airbus A321neos. In total, the airline has secured 32 aircraft under these lease agreements, significantly strengthening its narrow-body fleet.

All aircraft will be equipped with the latest generation of Thompson Vantage seats, featuring 16 fully lie-flat beds in Business Class arranged in a 2-2 / 1-1 configuration. Each aircraft will also offer Wi-Fi connectivity and a new in-flight entertainment system to enhance the passenger experience.

Thai Airways took delivery of its first A321neo on 24 December 2025, with its inaugural flight scheduled for 22 January 2026, on the Bangkok–Singapore route.

=== Airbus A330-300 ===
Thai Airways placed an order for twelve Airbus A330-300 aircraft, which were delivered to the airline between 1994 and 1998. The airline later placed additional orders and leases for another fifteen aircraft, delivered between 2009 and 2013. In 2018, three aircraft underwent a cabin retrofit program that equipped them with fully lie-flat Thomson Vantage seats in a “throne” seat configuration, while the older twelve aircraft were phased out between 2013 and 2017. Thai Airways later retired twelve of the fifteen remaining Airbus A330-300s, citing financial difficulties caused by the COVID-19 pandemic.

Following the airline’s financial recovery and the lifting of lockdown restrictions, Thai Airways signed a lease agreement with CDB Aviation for two used Airbus A330-300 aircraft on 2 January 2024. Both aircraft were formerly operated by Virgin Atlantic and were delivered in October 2024. They are equipped with 1-1-1 herringbone business class seats and a premium economy cabin. The airline later signed a lease agreement with Avolon for another used Airbus A330-300, also previously operated by Virgin Atlantic, which was delivered in August 2025.

=== Airbus A350-900 ===
Thai Airways announced a purchase deal for four Airbus A350-900s in 2011, along with lease agreements with Aviation Lease and Finance Company (ALAFCO) for six additional aircraft and two from CIT Aerospace International. All twelve aircraft were delivered between 2016 and 2018. The airline later signed lease agreements with various companies for eleven used Airbus A350-900s, the majority of which were previously operated by Hainan Airlines and delivered between 2023 and 2024. In 2025, Airbus and Thai Airways signed a Letter of Intent to retrofit the Airbus A350-900 fleet. The retrofit will include new Business and Economy Class seats, the introduction of a Premium Economy Class, and improvements to in-flight entertainment. Retrofitting is expected to begin in 2028.

=== Boeing 777 ===
Thai Airways operates two Boeing 777 variants: three Boeing 777-200ERs and seventeen Boeing 777-300ERs.

==== Boeing 777-200ER ====
Six aircraft were purchased and delivered to Thai Airways in 2006. They are currently being retired from the fleet, with completion of the retirement expected by 2029.

==== Boeing 777-300ER ====
Thai Airways initially leased five Boeing 777-300ERs from Jet Airways between 2011 and 2013, before the board of directors announced purchase and lease agreements for fourteen Boeing 777-300ERs on 13 June 2011. The batch was delivered between 2012 and 2015. The airline later signed a lease agreement with BOC Aviation for another three aircraft, which are equipped with Royal First Class cabins and were delivered in 2022. In 2025, the airline announced a cabin retrofit program for its fourteen Boeing 777-300ERs, which will soon be equipped with new business class seats featuring privacy doors and enhanced comfort. The new cabin configuration will also introduce a premium economy class and a 3-4-3 economy class layout. The airline also purchased four of the previously leased aircraft from BOC Aviation.

=== Boeing 787 ===
Thai Airways currently operates two Boeing 787 variants: six Boeing 787-8s and three Boeing 787-9s, and will soon operate six Boeing 787-10s.

==== Boeing 787-8 ====
Thai Airways leased six Boeing 787-8s from International Lease Finance Corporation in 2011, which were delivered to the airline in 2014 and 2015. On 23 October 2025, the airline held its annual general meeting, where one of the main topics of discussion was the decision to lease 8–10 wide-body aircraft. The plans under consideration included two options: leasing eight Airbus A330-200s, previously operated by American Airlines, from Jetran; or leasing ten Boeing 787-8s, previously operated by China Southern Airlines, from Avolon. However, both options were initially rejected due to concerns over outdated technology. Subsequently, the decision was revised, with Thai Airways choosing the latter option and proceeding to lease ten Boeing 787-8s from Avolon. The agreement is currently ongoing and is expected to be completed by February 2026, with a discount already offered by the lessor.

==== Boeing 787-9 ====
Thai Airways announced plans to lease two Boeing 787-9s from ILFC in 2011, which were delivered to the airline in 2016. On 20 February 2024, Thai Airways announced an order for 45 Boeing 787-9s directly from Boeing, along with options for an additional 35 aircraft. These options can be converted to the larger Boeing 787-10 or the Boeing 777X series as the airline seeks to modernize and expand its widebody fleet and international network. Thai Airways’ Boeing 787-9s will be equipped with GEnx engines. To meet demand in high-traffic Asian markets, the airline converted six of its aircraft orders to the Boeing 787-10. These Boeing 787s will also feature new business class seats, premium economy, and economy class—similar to the retrofitted Boeing 777-300ERs. Additionally, Thai Airways has signed lease agreements with AerCap for four Boeing 787-9s—one of which has already been delivered—and with Air Lease Corporation for another three. In total, Thai Airways is scheduled to take delivery of 44 Boeing 787-9s and 6 Boeing 787-10s. Two of the Boeing 787-9s leased from AerCap were delivered in May 2024 and October 2025.

== Fleet History ==
=== Airbus A340 ===
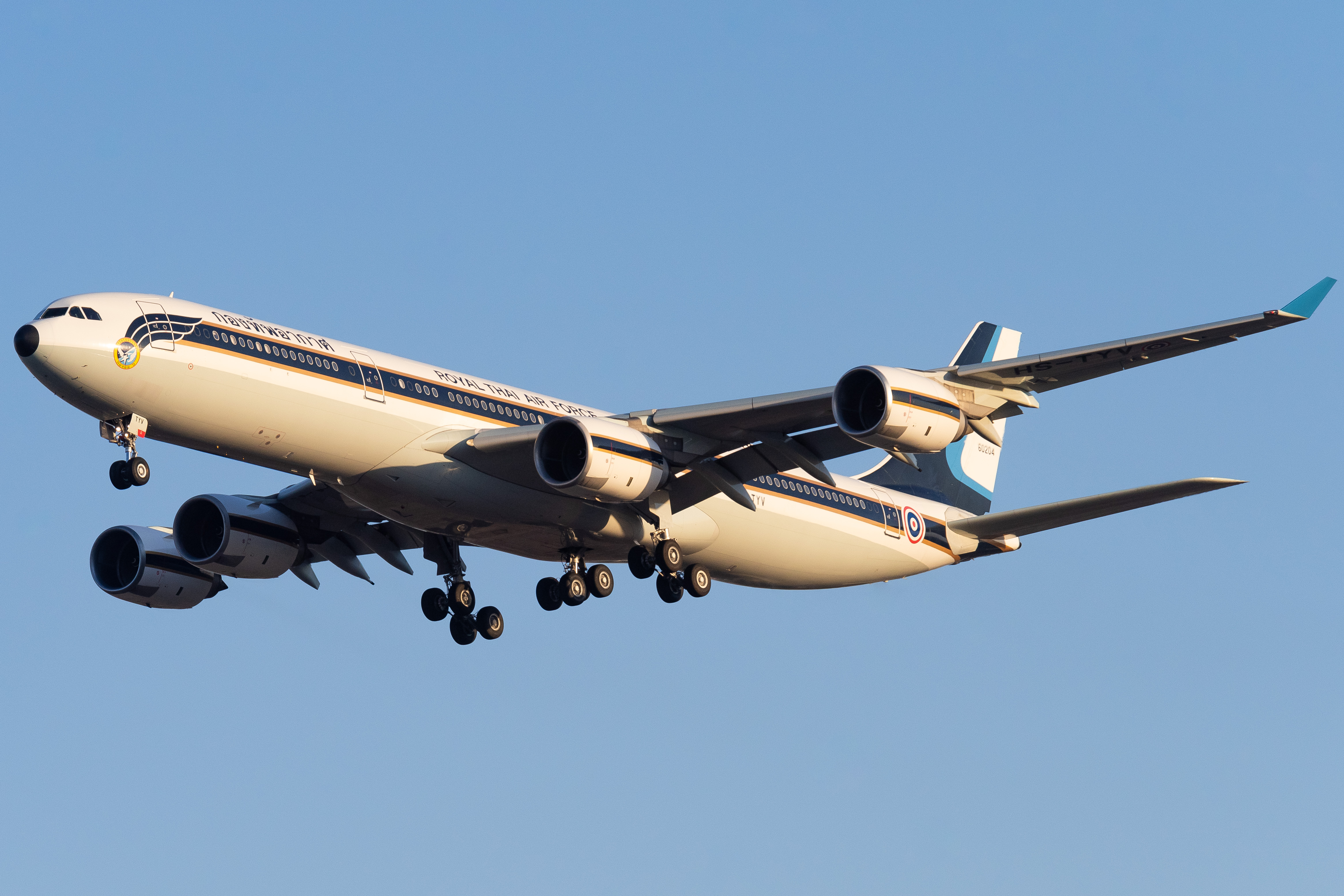
One of the former Thai Airways Airbus A340-500 aircraft is currently in service with the Royal Thai Air Force.

Thai Airways initially ordered three Airbus A340-500s and four Airbus A340-600s in 2003, before adding one additional A340-500 and one A340-600 in 2004. The purpose of the order was for Thai Airways to operate direct non-stop flights from Bangkok to New York using the Airbus A340-500, which was configured with 60 business-class seats, 42 premium economy seats, and 113 economy-class seats, competing with Singapore Airlines. Meanwhile, the Airbus A340-600, configured with 8 first-class, 60 business-class, and 199 economy-class seats, was intended to operate non-stop flights from Bangkok to Los Angeles.

The New York flight began on 1 May 2005 but was discontinued on 1 July 2008 due to major financial losses. The Los Angeles service was later converted to a one-stop flight via Incheon Airport in 2012, before being discontinued in 2015. After both routes were terminated, the aircraft were grounded at Don Mueang Airport and U-Tapao Airport and listed for sale on Thai Aircraft Trading website. One Airbus A340-500 was sold to the Royal Thai Air Force in 2016. The remaining aircraft were sold to Hua An Aviation Parts Co., Ltd. in 2022 and delivered to the company between 2024 and 2025.

=== Airbus A380 ===
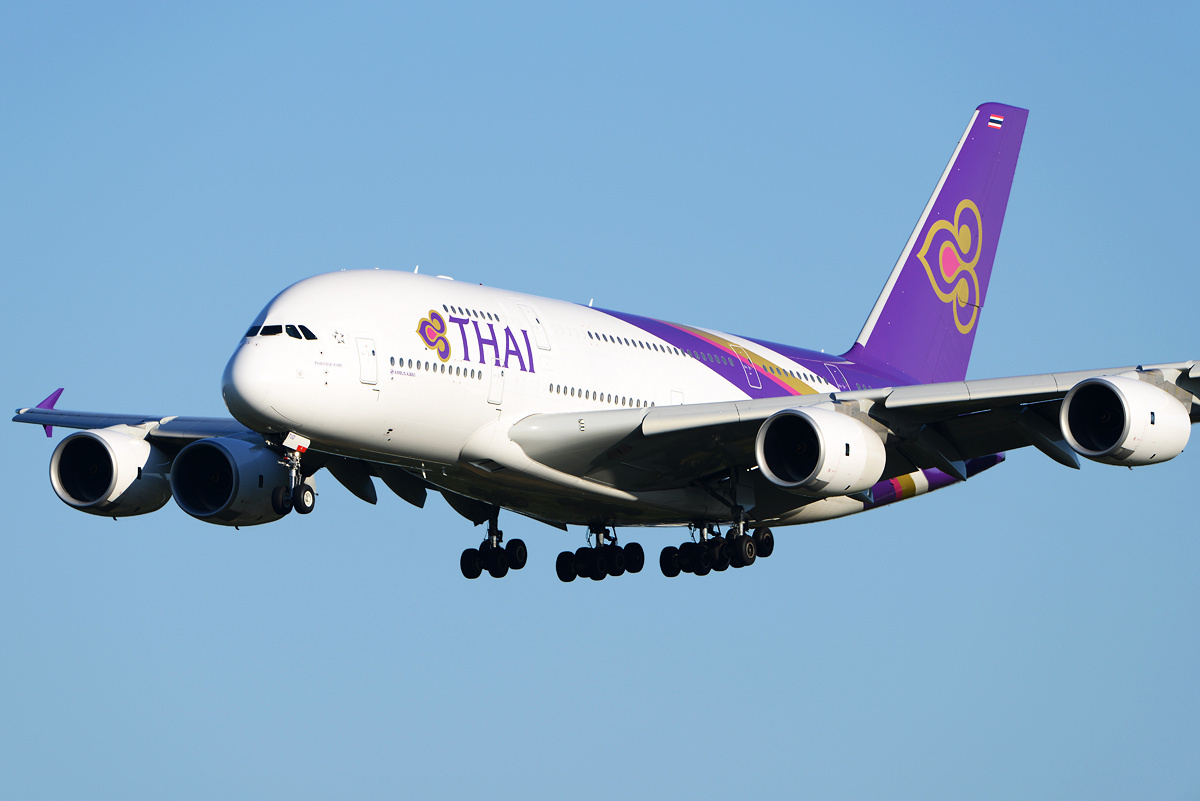
Airbus A380-800

The airline ordered six Airbus A380-800s, which were delivered between 2012 and 2013. The aircraft were configured with 12 first-class seats, 60 business-class seats, and 435 economy-class seats, and operated on Thai Airways routes to Frankfurt, London Heathrow, Osaka Kansai, Paris Charles de Gaulle, and Tokyo Narita.

The fleet was grounded in 2020 due to the COVID-19 pandemic and was initially expected to return to service in 2024. However, the plan to revive the aircraft was abandoned in 2022 due to high operating costs. All aircraft were stored at Bangkok Suvarnabhumi Airport and U-Tapao Airport and listed for sale on the Thai Aircraft Trading website. The entire fleet was sold in 2024 to an undisclosed customer.

=== Former fleet ===
Thai Airways International historical fleet
Aircraft	Total	Year Introduced	Year Retired	Replacement	Notes
ATR 42-300	2	1990	1998	None	
ATR 72-200	2	1990	2009	None	Transferred to Nok Air.
Airbus A300B4	14	1977	1998	Airbus A300-600; Airbus A330-300; Boeing 777-200	
Airbus A300-600	21	1985	2014	Airbus A320-200; Airbus A330-300; Boeing 787 Dreamliner	
Airbus A310-200	2	1988	2001	Airbus A330-300	Transferred from Thai Airways Company.
Airbus A310-200	2	1988	1998	None	Crashed as flight TG261.
Airbus A310-300	2	1990	1993	Airbus A330-300	Acquired from Canadian Airlines.
Airbus A310-300	2	1990	1992	None	Crashed as flight TG311.
Airbus A340-500	3	2005	2012	Airbus A350-900; Boeing 777-300ER	All aircraft are listed for sale.
Airbus A340-500	1	2005	2012	Airbus A350-900; Boeing 777-300ER	Sold to Royal Thai Air Force.
Airbus A340-600	6	2005	2015	Airbus A350-900; Boeing 777-300ER	Disposed to Hua An Aviation Parts Co. Ltd.
Airbus A380-800	6	2012	2020	Airbus A350-900; Boeing 777-300ER	Early retirement due to COVID-19 pandemic. All six aircraft are to be sold off.
BAe 146-100	1	1989	1991	Boeing 737 Classic	
BAe 146-200	1	1989	1989	Boeing 737 Classic	
BAe 146-300	9	1989	1998	Boeing 737 Classic	
Boeing 737-200	3	1988	1993	Boeing 737-400	Transferred from Thai Airways Company.
Boeing 737-400	6	1990	2018	Airbus A320-200	
Boeing 737-400	3	1990	2004	None	Transferred to Nok Air.
Boeing 737-400	1	1990	2001	None	Destroyed by explosion as flight TG114
Boeing 747-200B	6	1979	1997	Boeing 747-300; Boeing 747-400	
Boeing 747-200SF	1	1996	1999	None	Leased from Atlas Air
Boeing 747-300	2	1987	2007	Boeing 747-400	
Boeing 747-400	16	1990	2020	Airbus A350-900; Boeing 777-300ER	Early retirement due to COVID-19 pandemic.
Boeing 747-400	2	1990	2011	Airbus A350-900; Boeing 777-300ER	HS-TGH & HS-TGJ Converted into Freighters
Boeing 747-400BCF	2	2012	2015	None	Converted from Passenger Boeing 747-400; Disposed to Aerotranscargo
Boeing 777-200	8	1996	2020	Airbus A350-900; Boeing 777-300ER	Early Retirement due to COVID-19 pandemic.
Boeing 777-300	6	1998	2020	Airbus A350-900; Boeing 777-300ER	Early retirement due to COVID-19 pandemic.
Boeing 777F	2	2010	2012	Boeing 747-400BCF	Leased from Southern Air
Canadair Challenger CL-601-3A-ER	1	1991	Unknown	None	
Convair 990 Coronado	2	1962	Unknown	None	Operated by Scandinavian Airlines.
Douglas DC-6B	7	1960	1964	None	First aircraft in fleet. Leased from Scandinavian Airlines.
Douglas DC-8-33	7	1970	1978	None	
Douglas DC-8-62	6	1972	1984	None	Leased from Scandinavian Airlines.
Douglas DC-8-61CF	2	1977	1979	None	Leased from Seaboard World Airlines.
Douglas DC-8-62AF	1	1979	1982	None	
Douglas DC-8-62CF	2	1984	1985	None	Leased from Scandinavian Airlines
Douglas DC-8-63	3	1974	1985	Airbus A300	
McDonnell Douglas DC-9-41	3	1970	1972	None	Leased from Scandinavian Airlines.
McDonnell Douglas DC-10-30	7	1975	1987	Airbus A310	
McDonnell Douglas DC-10-30ER	3	1987	1998	Airbus A310	Disposed to Northwest Airlines.
McDonnell Douglas MD-11	4	1991	2006	Boeing 777-200ER	Disposed to UPS Airlines.
Short 330	4	1988	1992	Boeing 737 Classic	Transferred from Thai Airways Company.
Short 360	2	1988	Unknown	Boeing 737 Classic	Transferred from Thai Airways Company.
Sud Aviation SE-210 Caravelle III	14	1964	1968	None	Leased from Scandinavian Airlines.
Sud Aviation SE-210 Caravelle III	1	1964	1967	None	Crashed as flight TG601.

Thai Airways former fleet

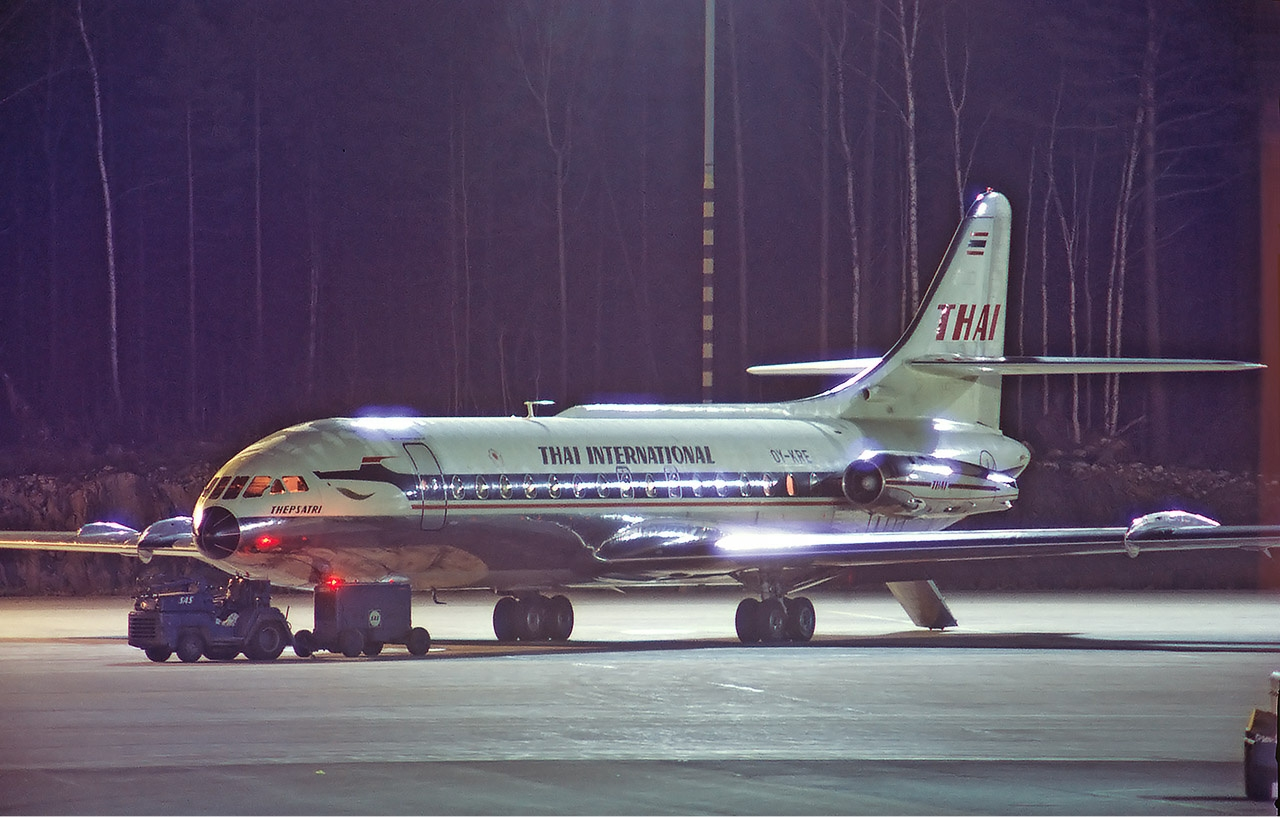
Sud Aviation SE-210 Caravelle III

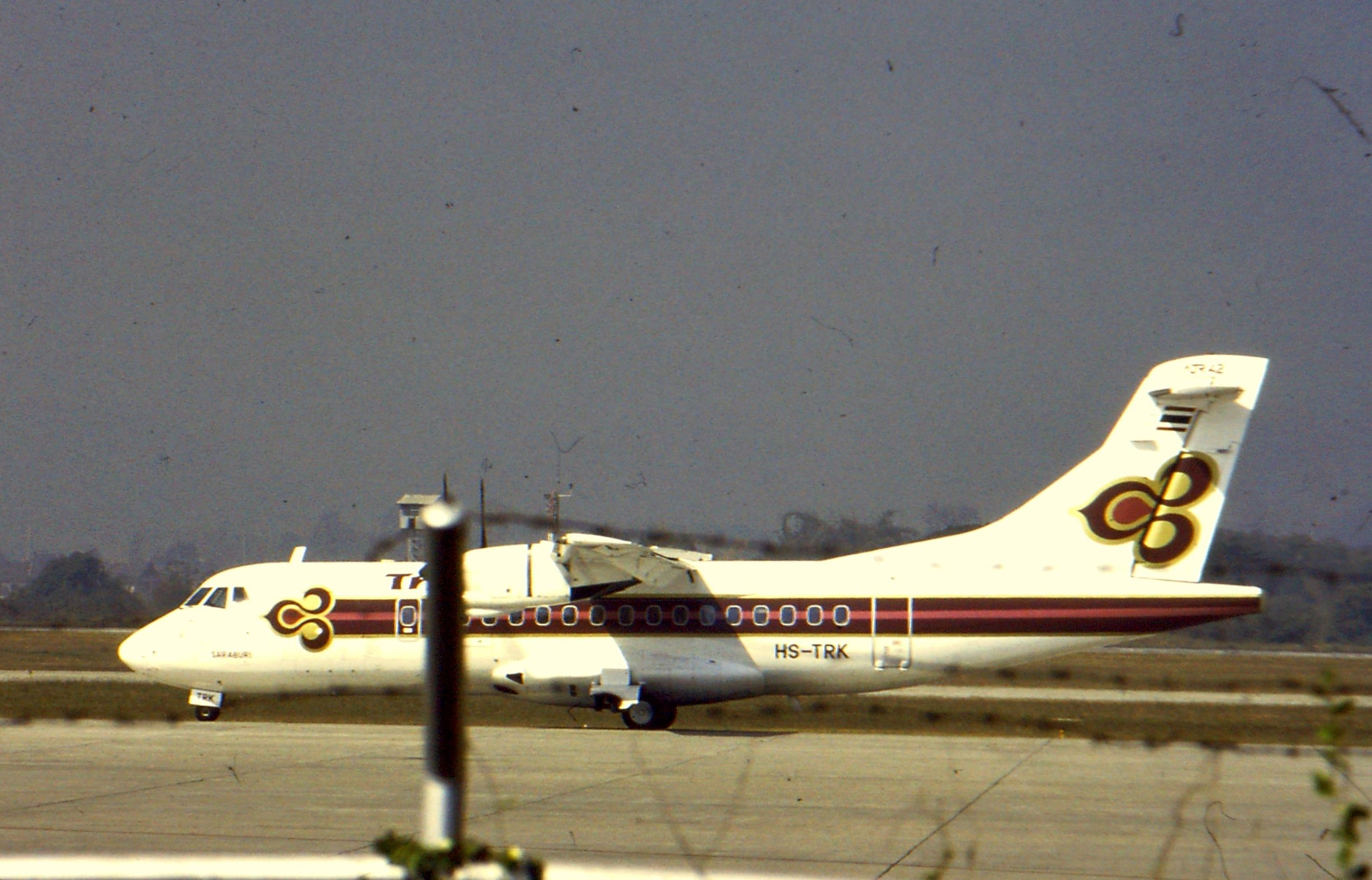
ATR 42-320

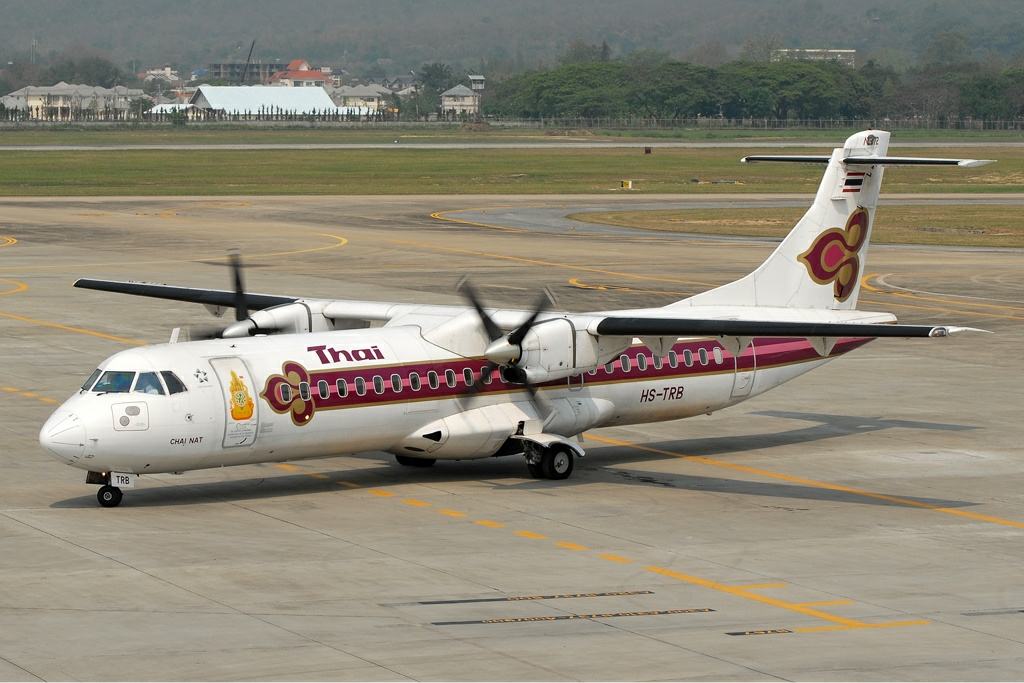
ATR 72-201

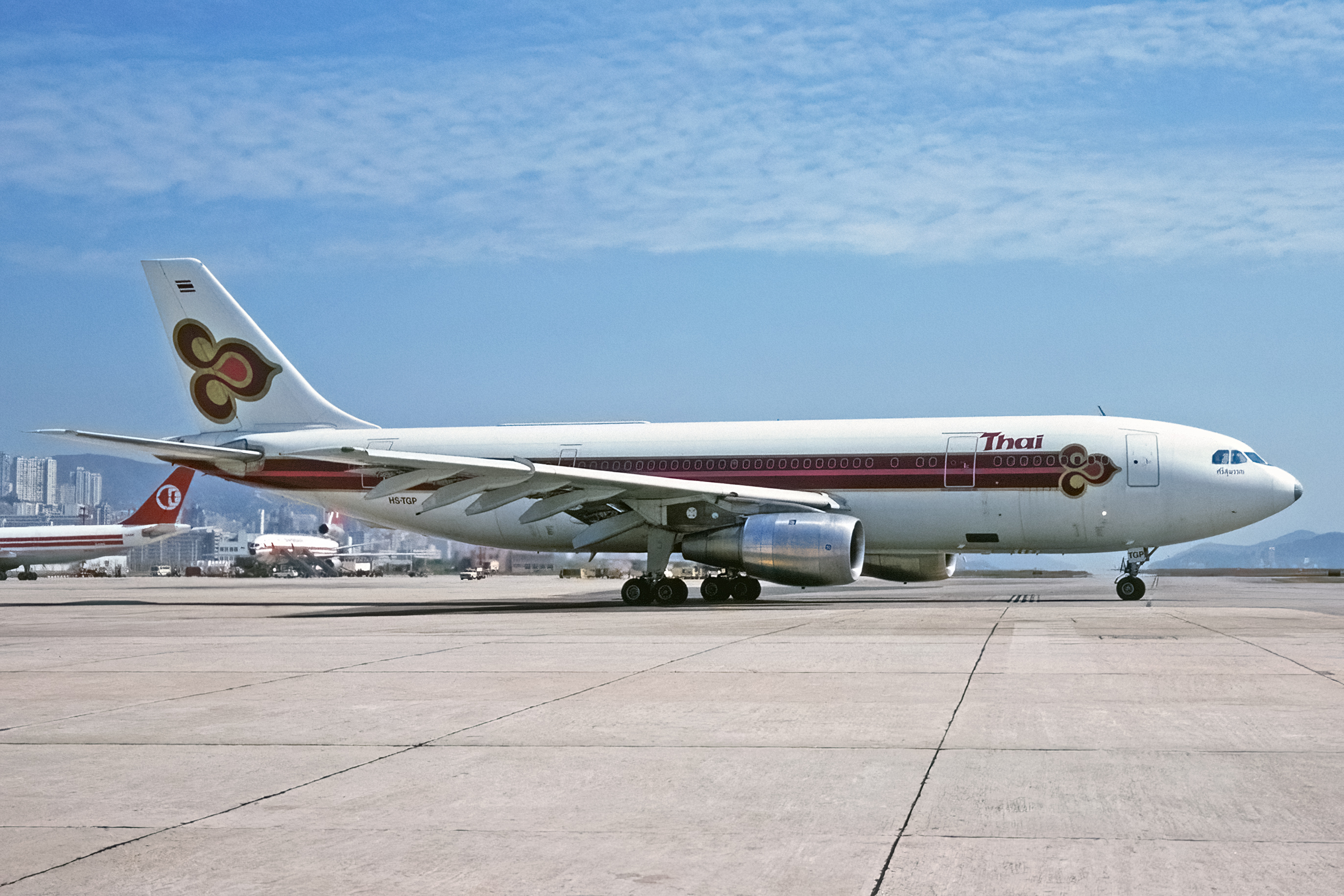
Airbus A300B4

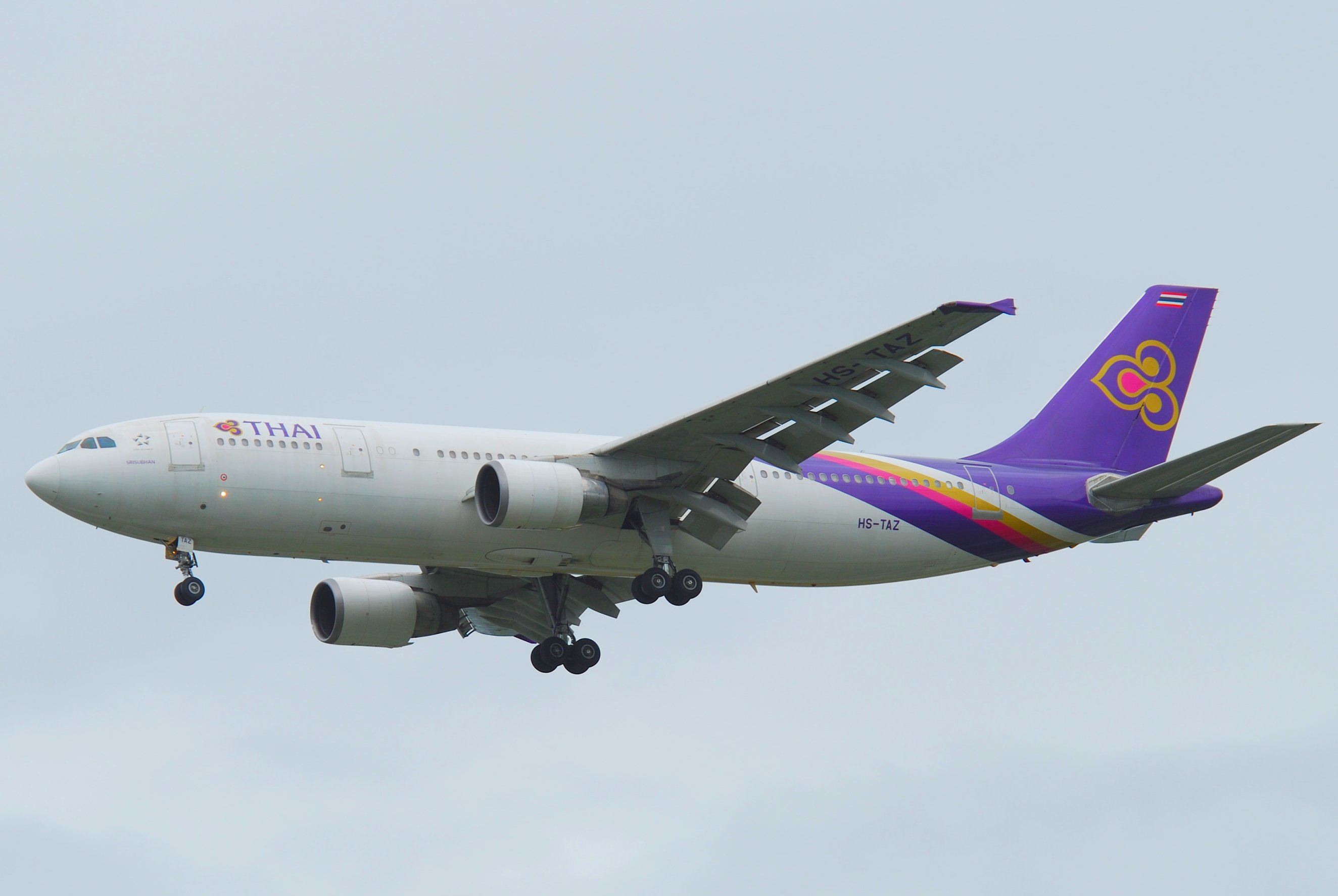
Airbus A300-600

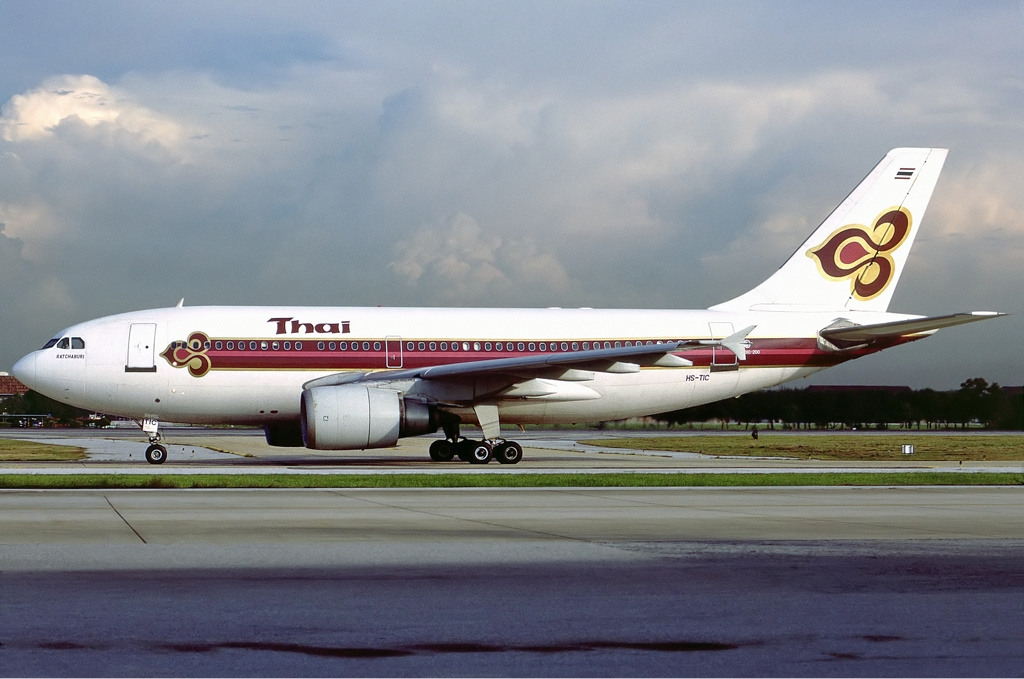
Airbus A310-200

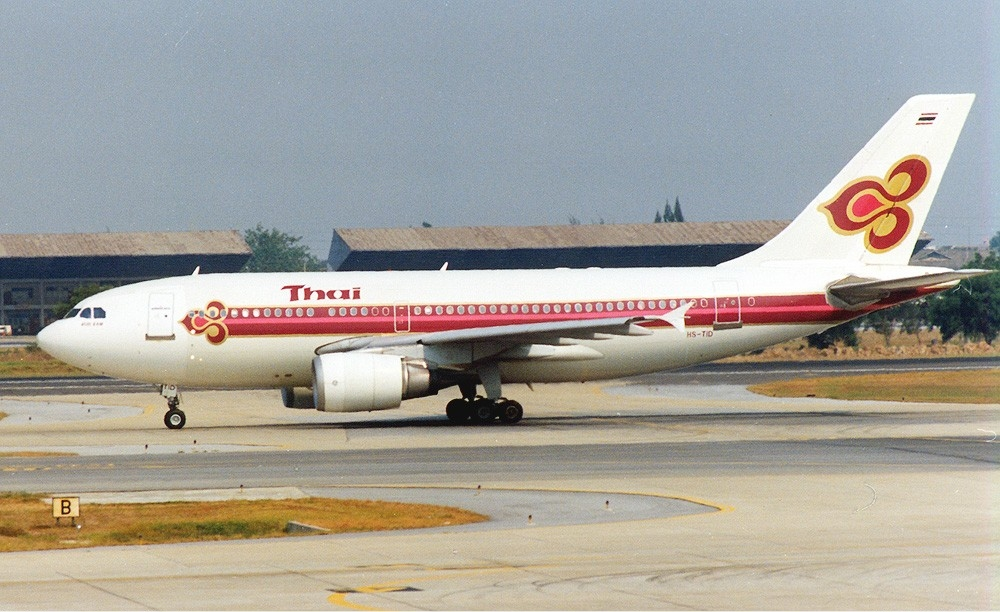
Airbus A310-300

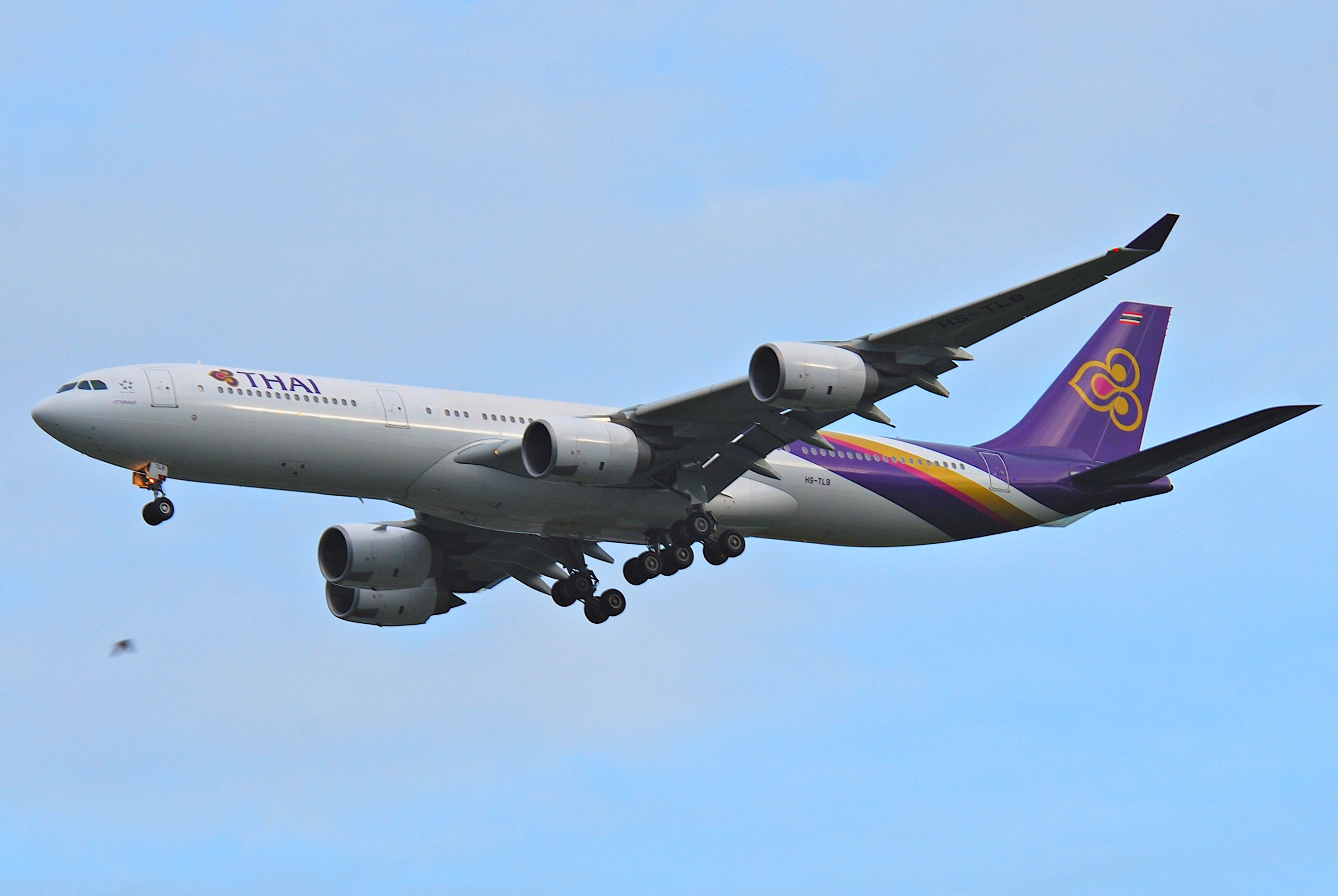
Airbus A340-500

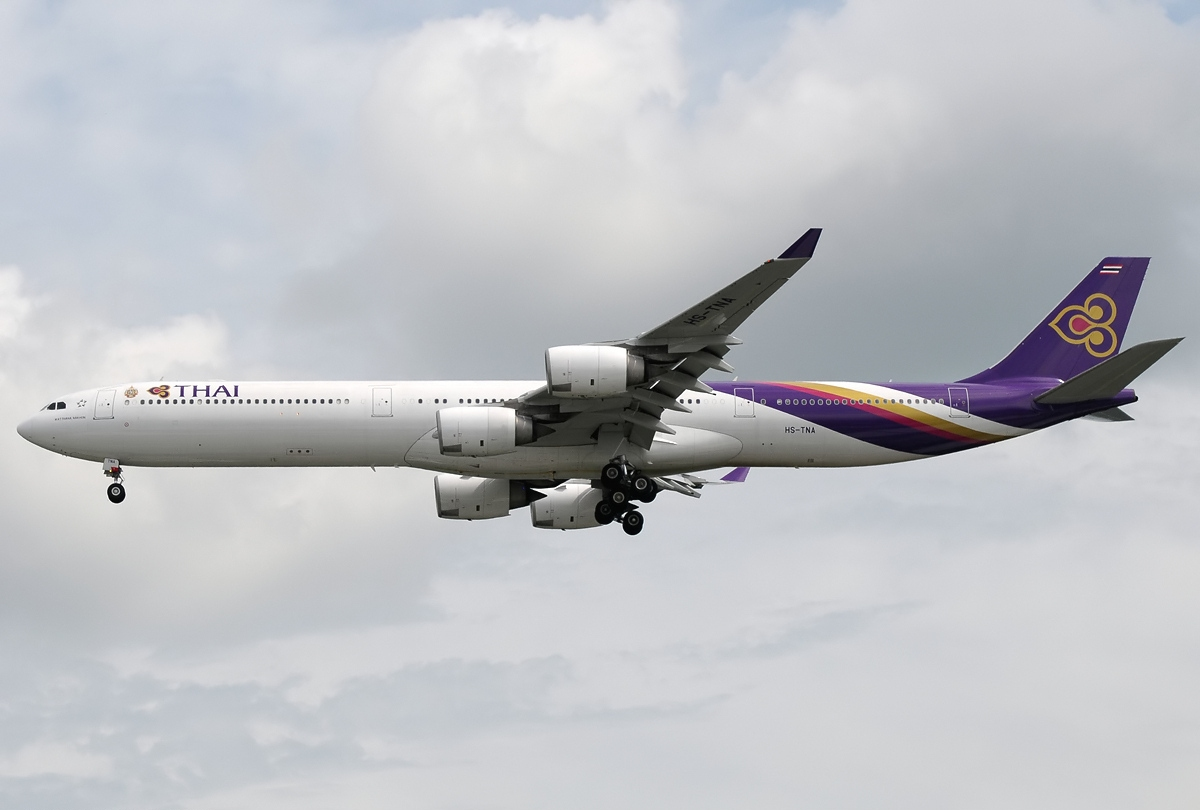
Airbus A340-600

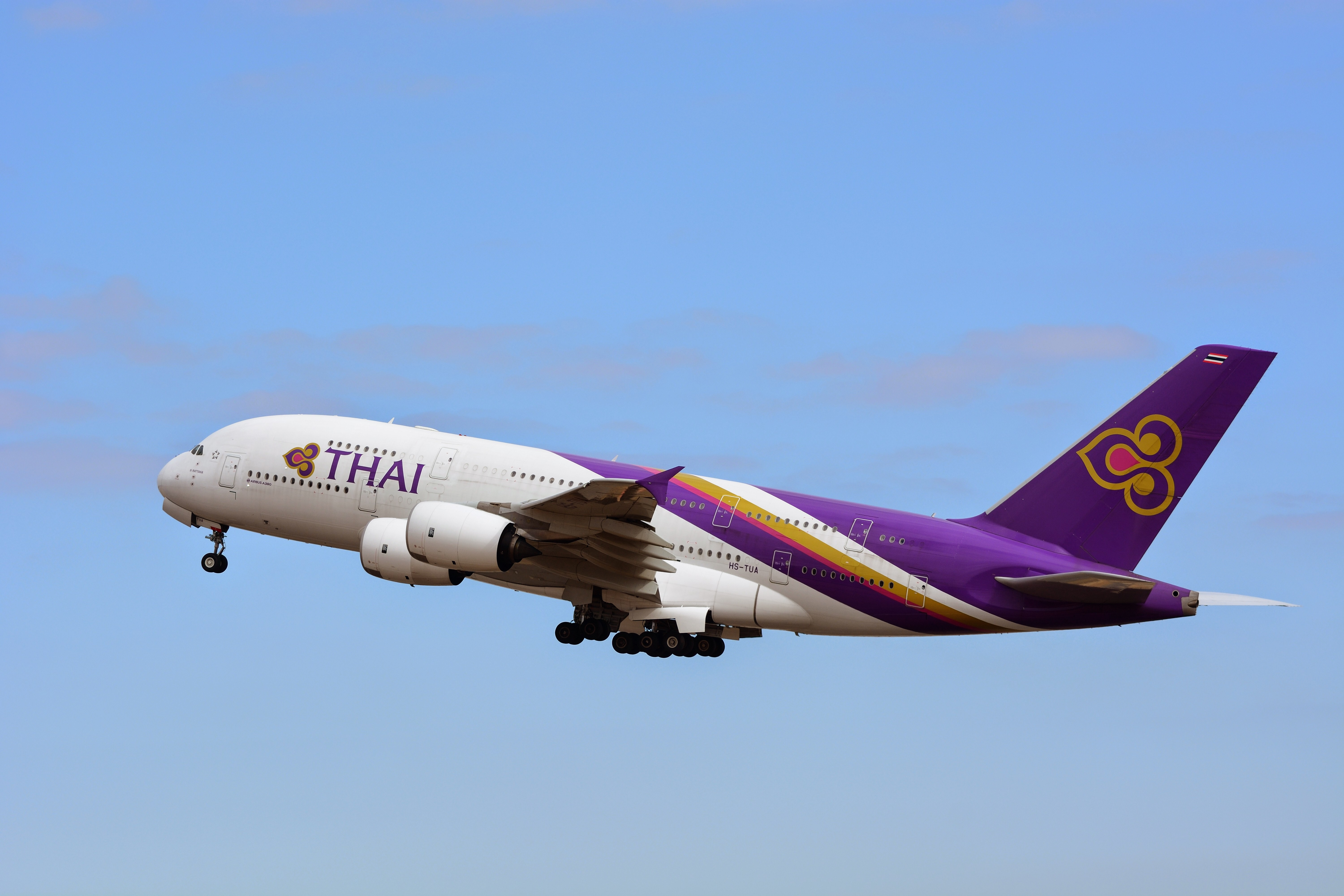
Airbus A380-800

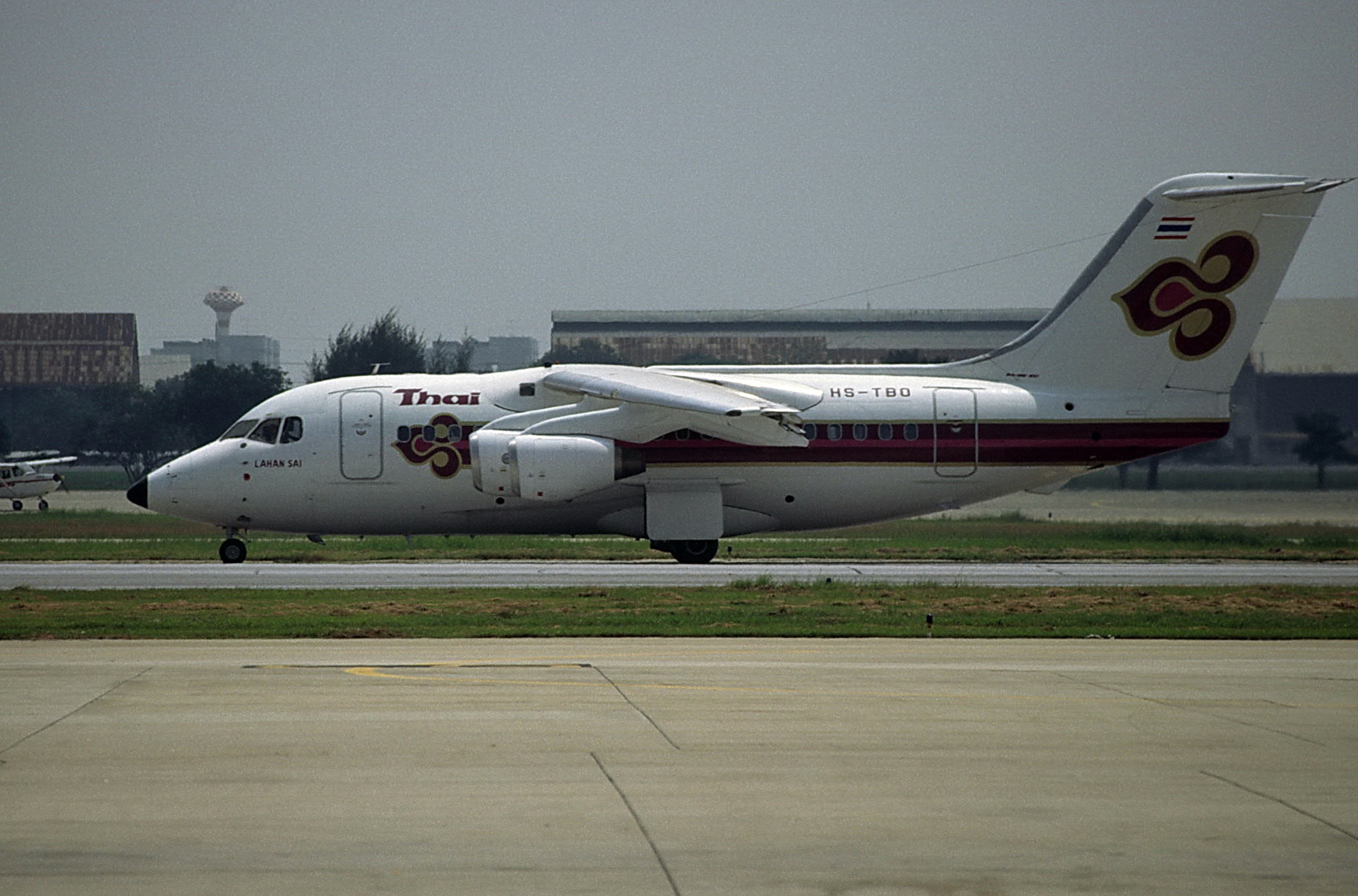
British Aerospace 146-100

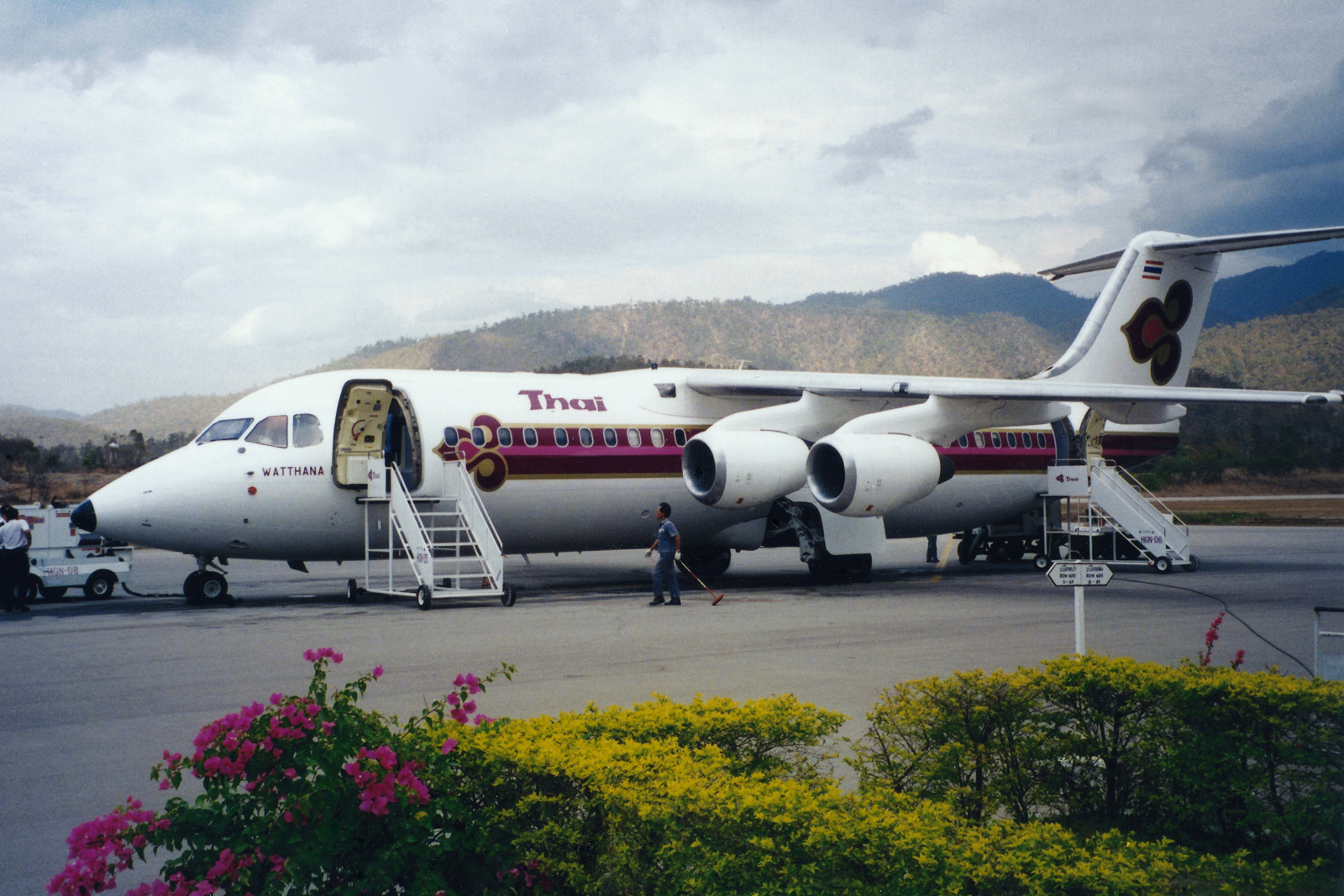
British Aerospace 146-300

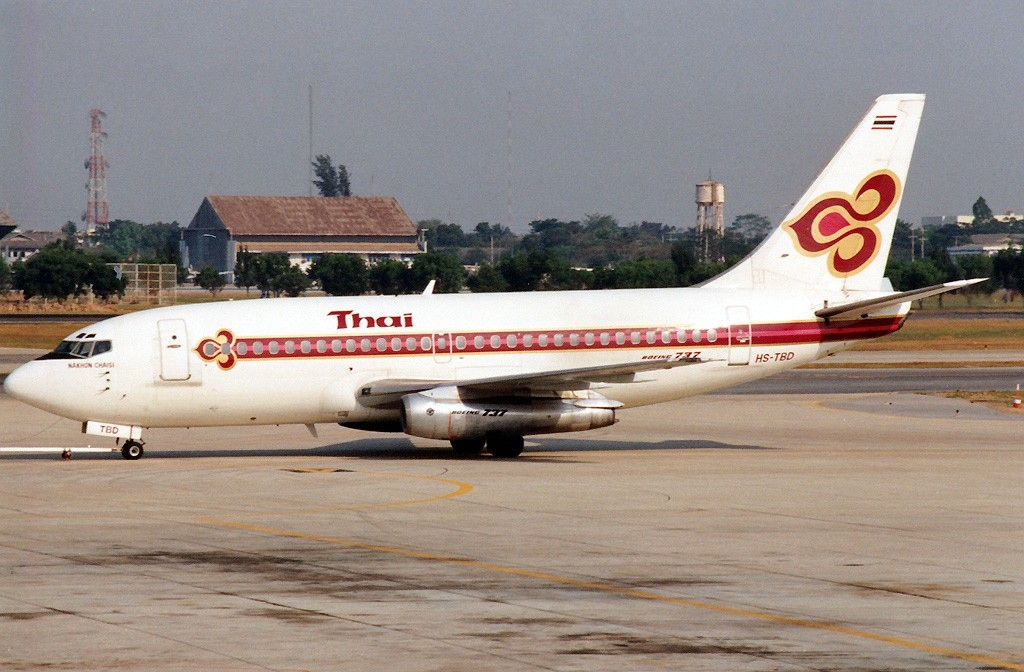
Boeing 737-200

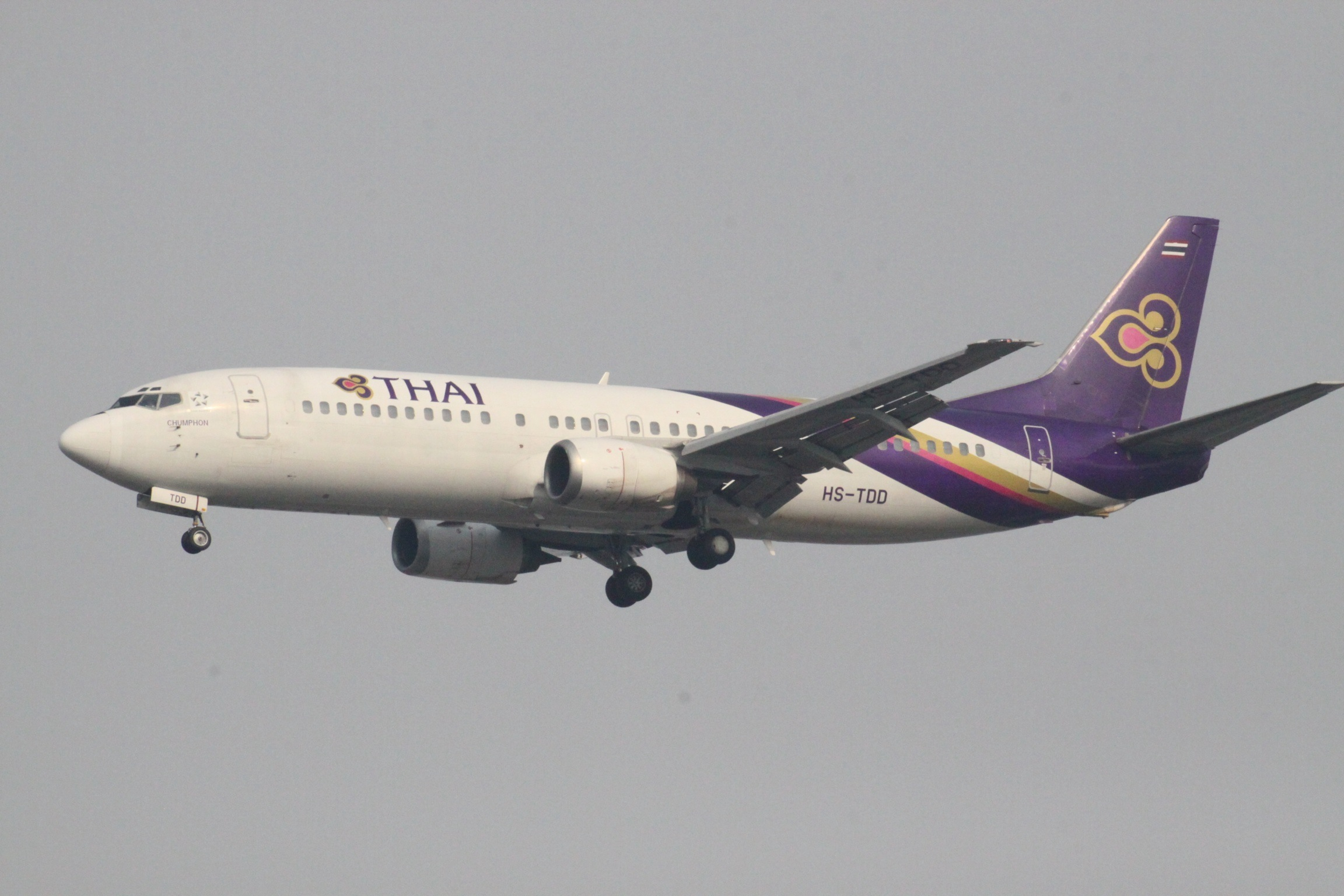
Boeing 737-400

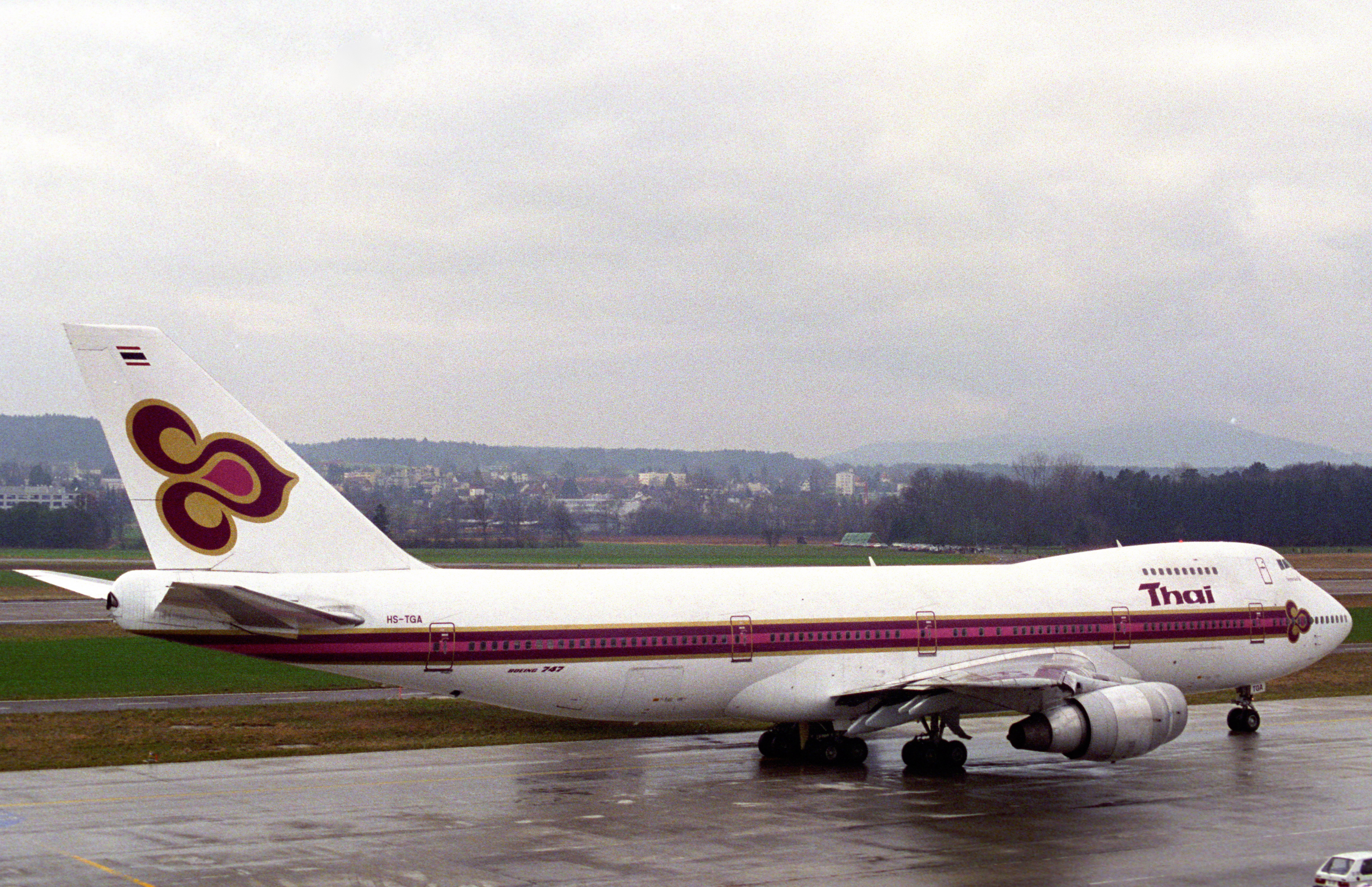
Boeing 747-200

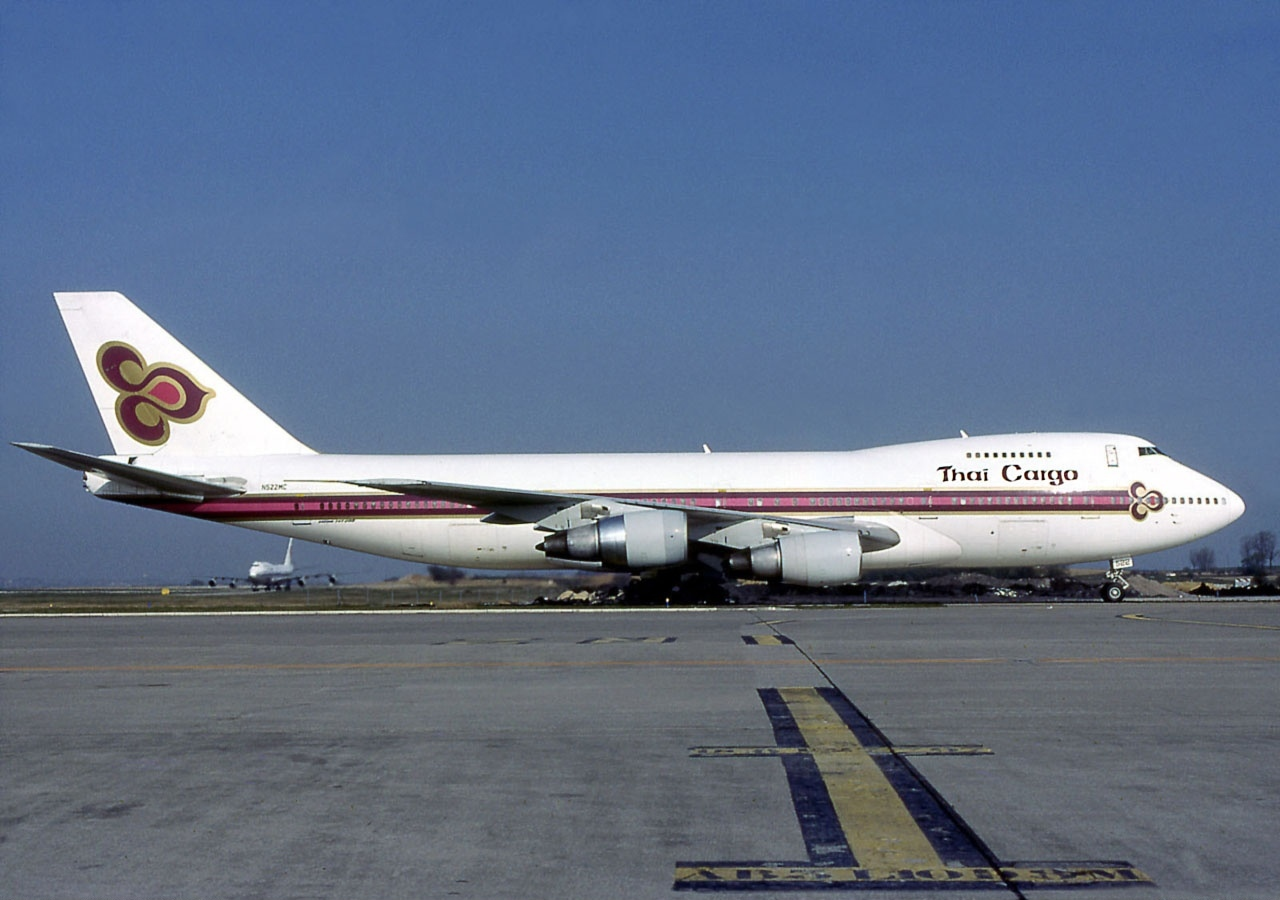
Boeing 747-200F

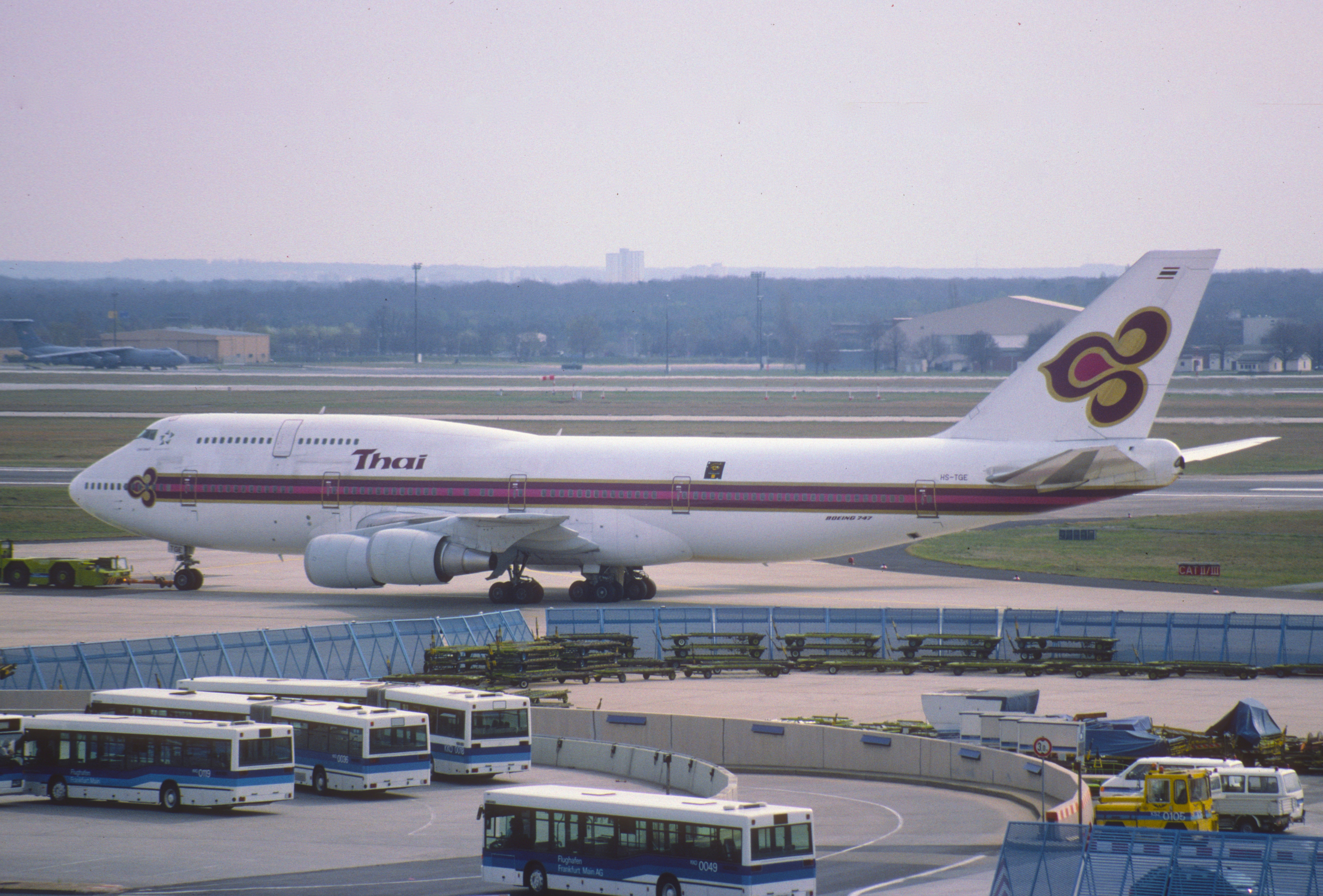
Boeing 747-300

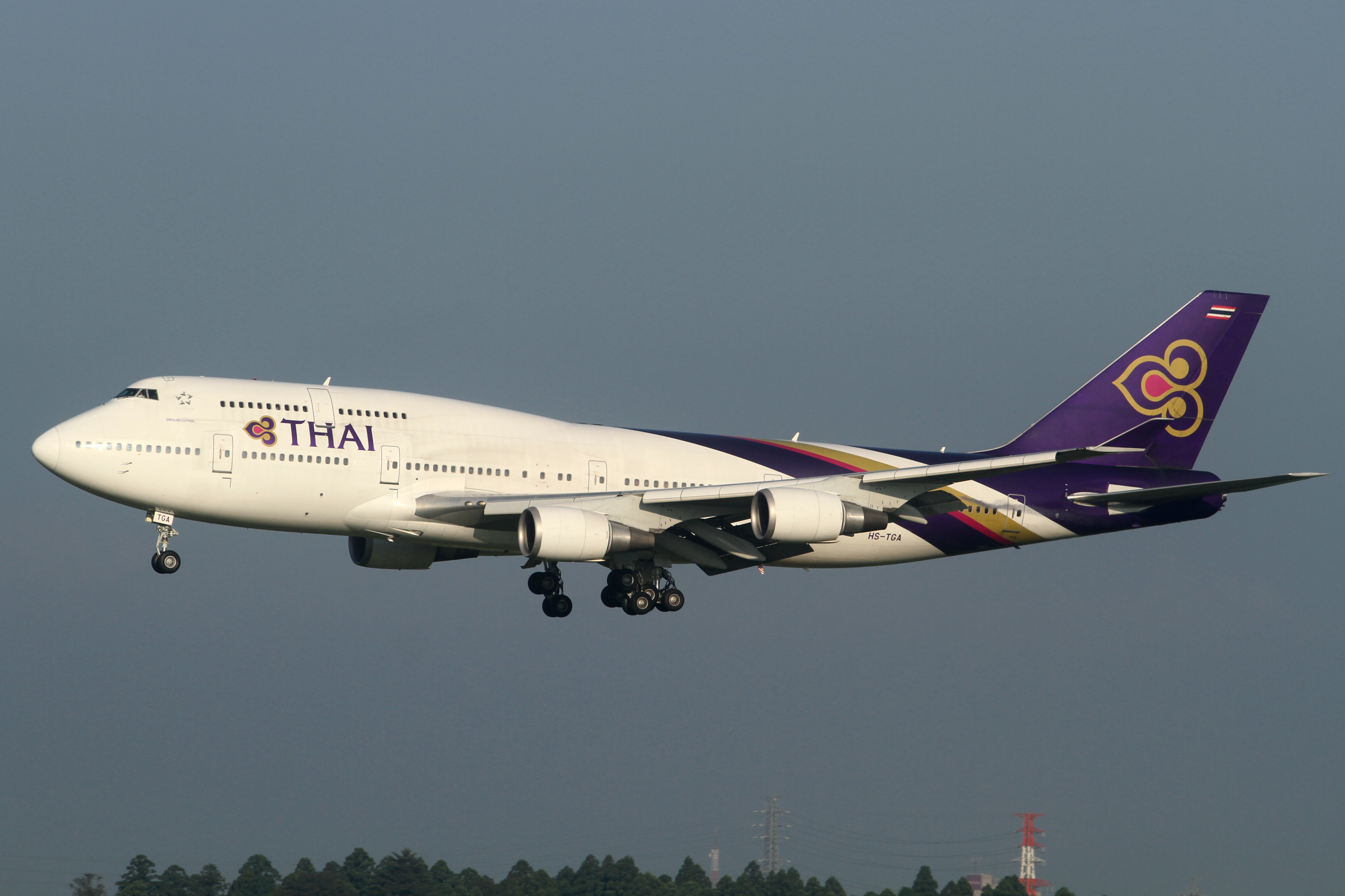
Boeing 747-400

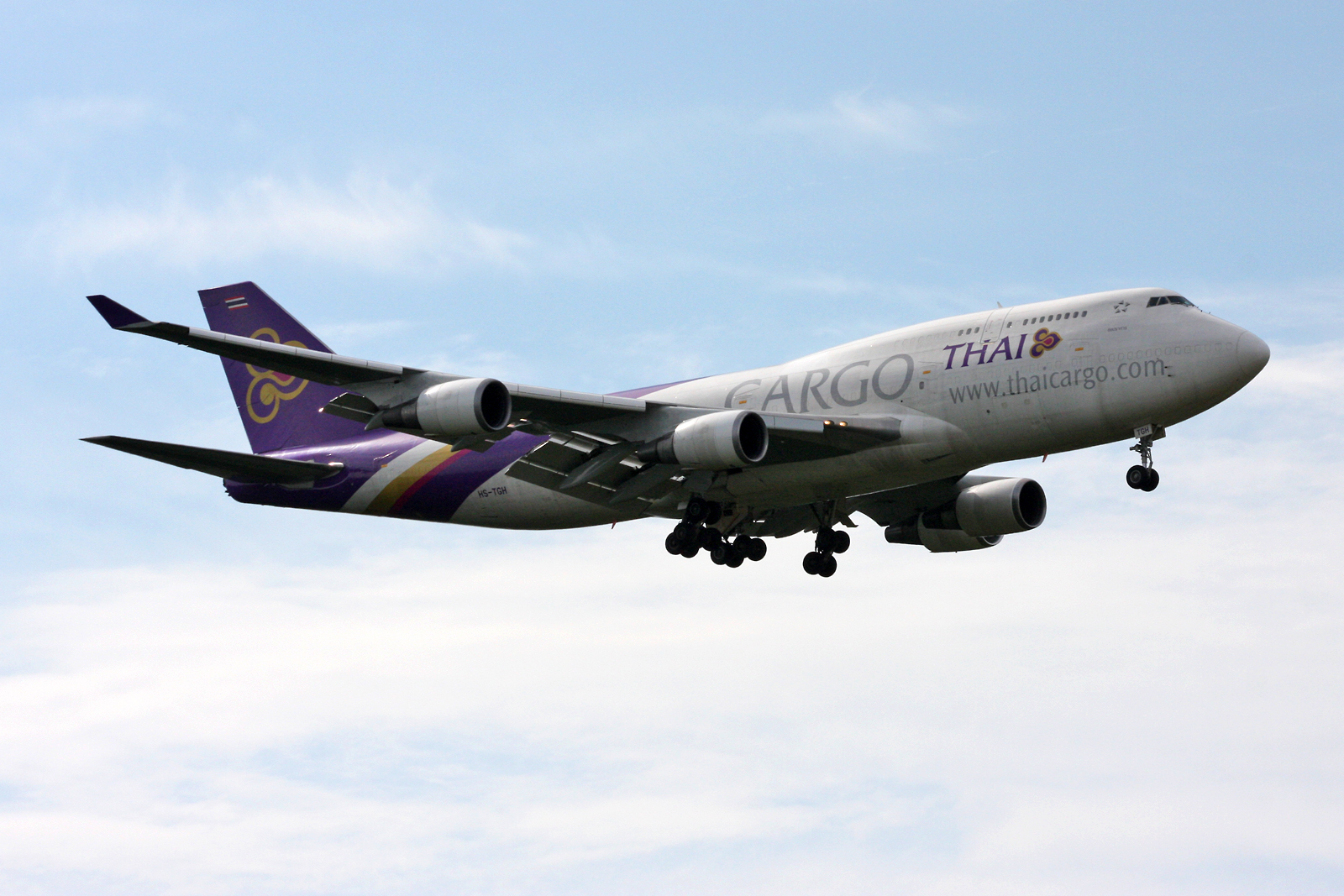
Boeing 747-400BCF

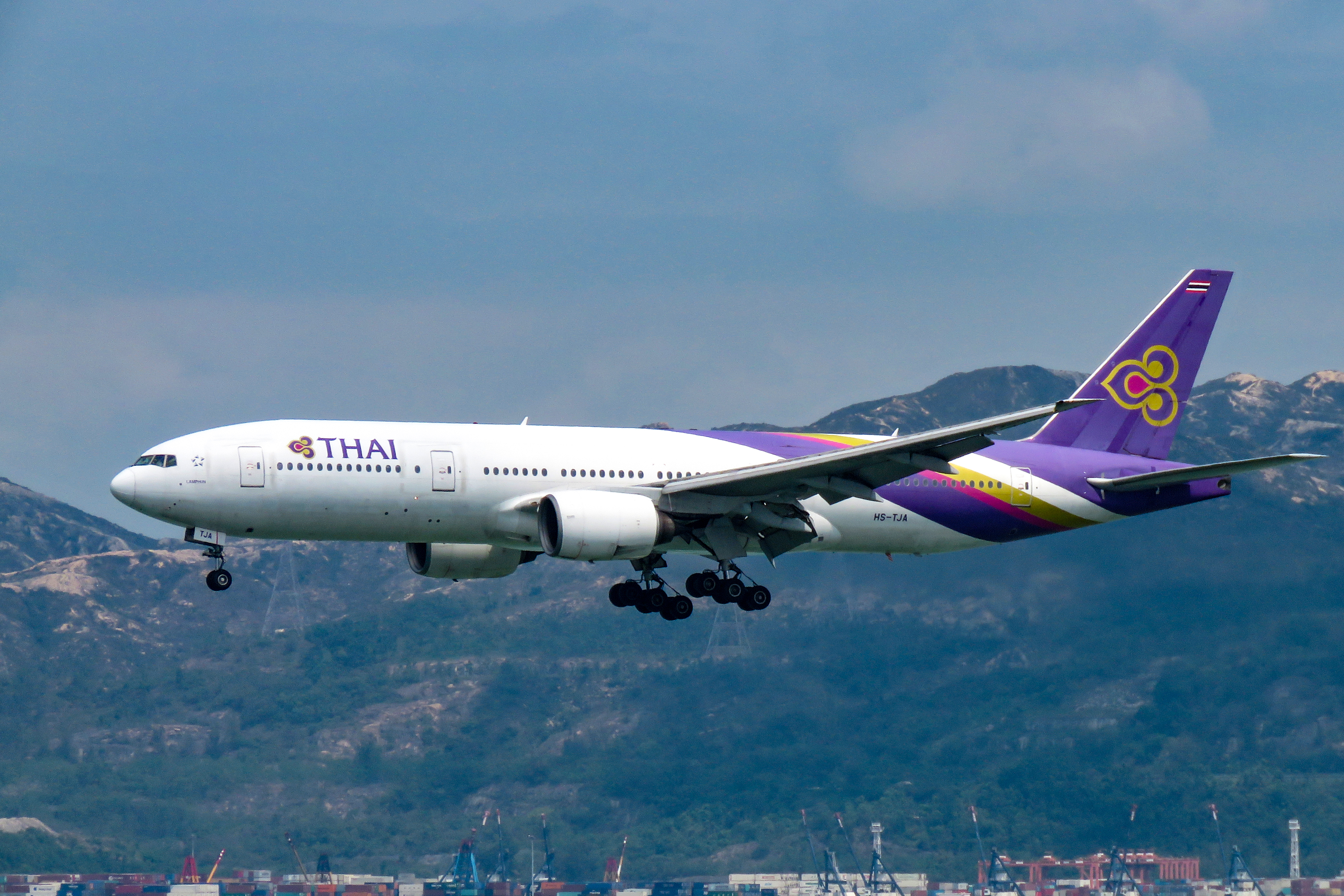
Boeing 777-200

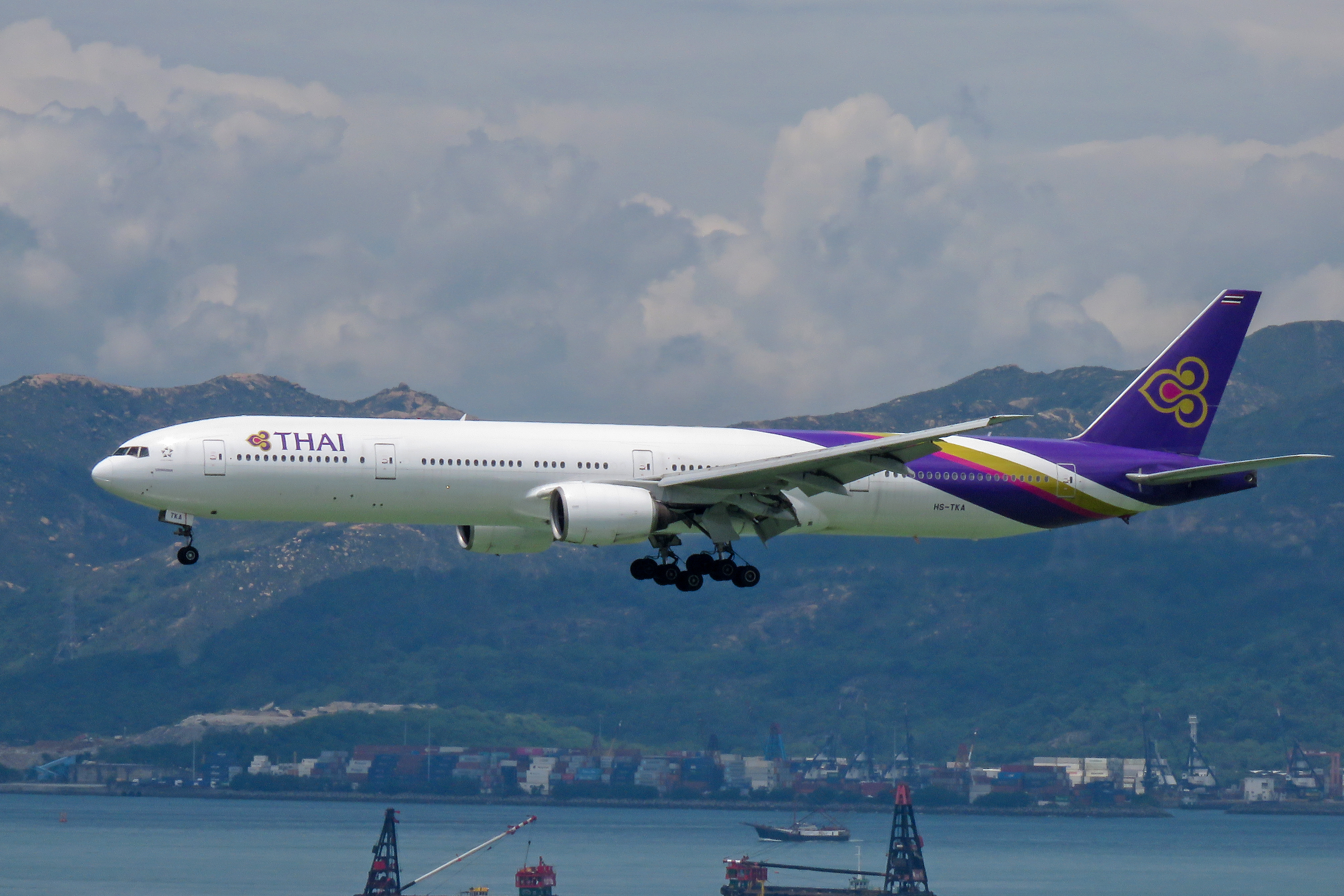
Boeing 777-300

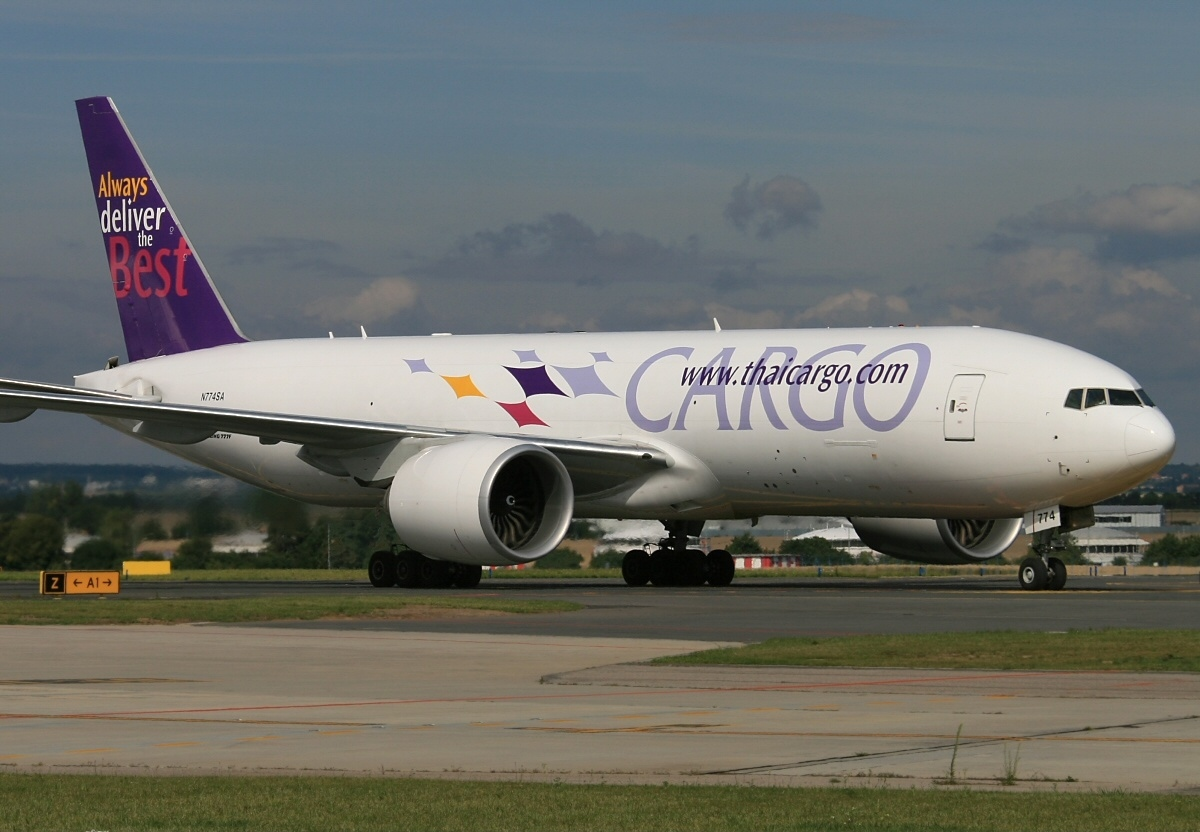
Boeing 777-FZB

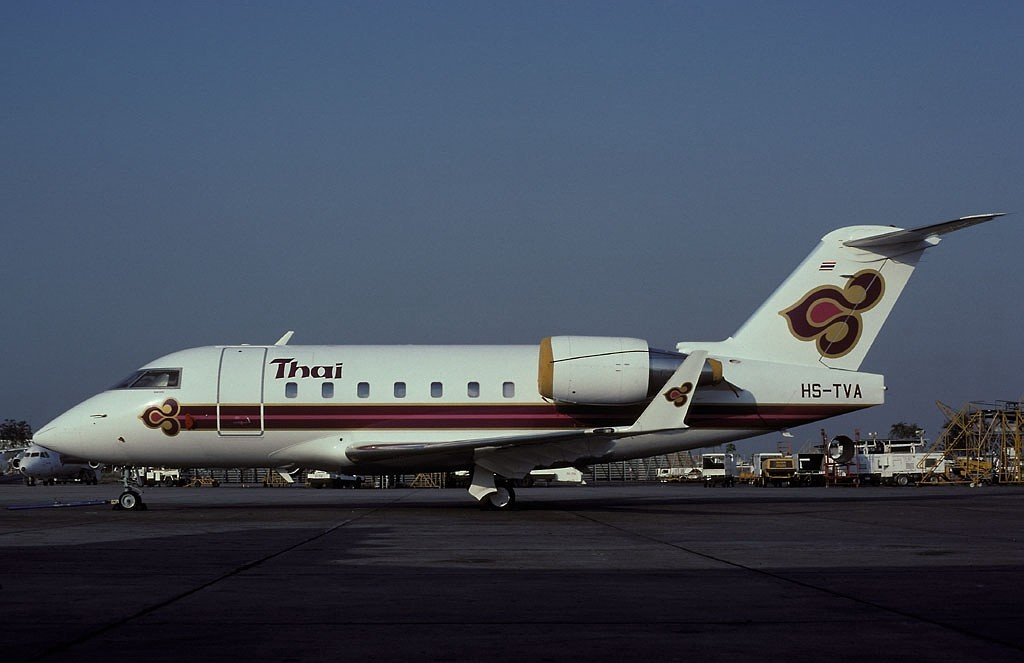
Canadair Challenger 601-3A

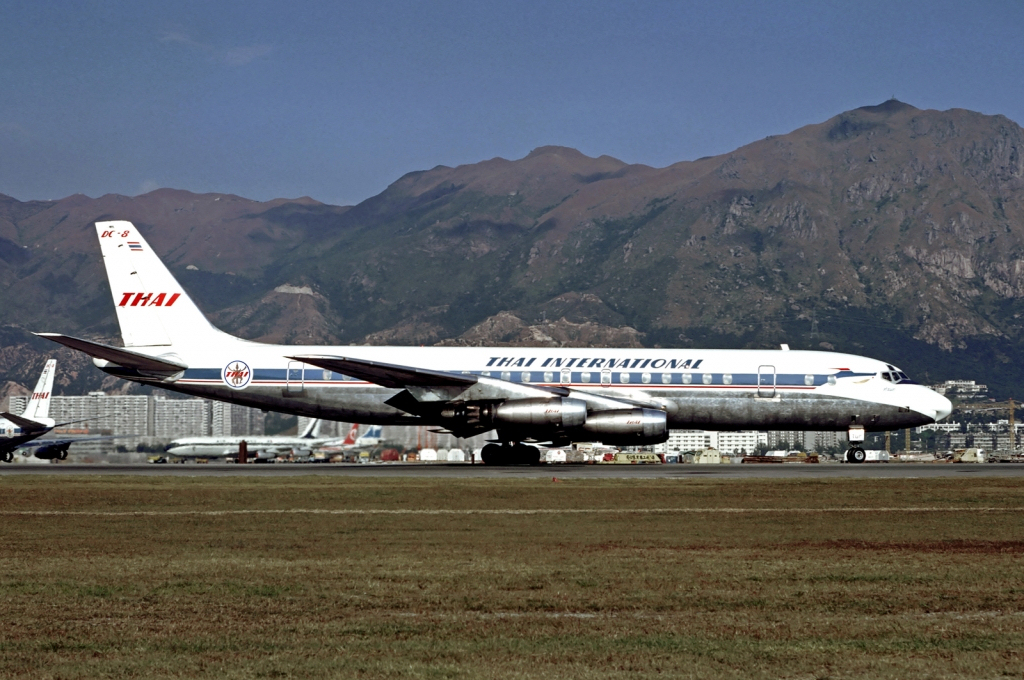
Douglas DC-8-32

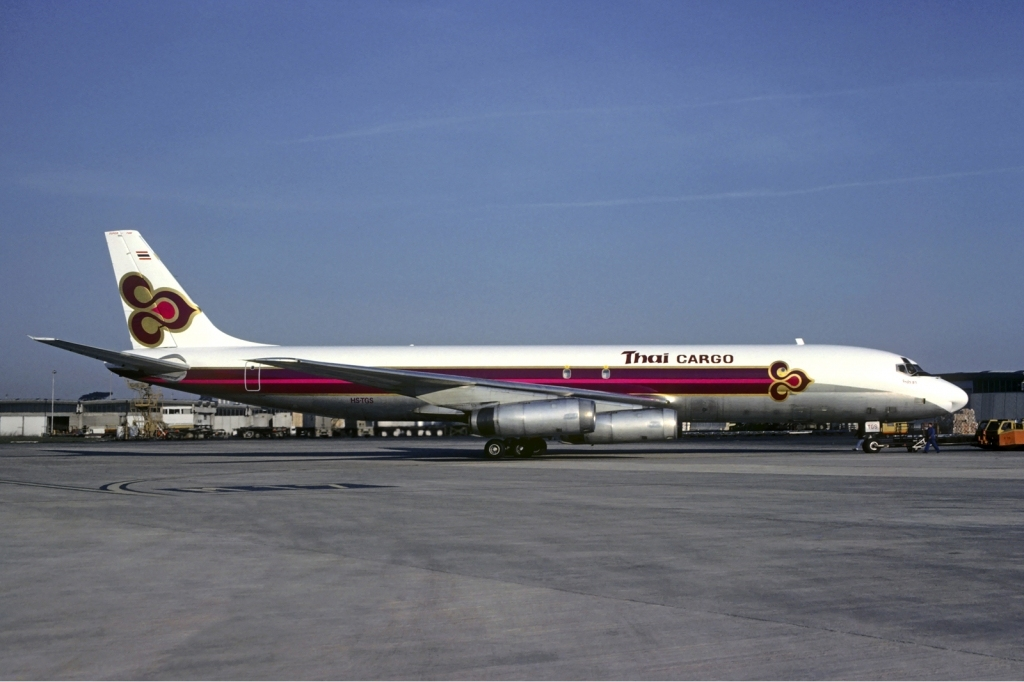
Douglas DC-8-62AF

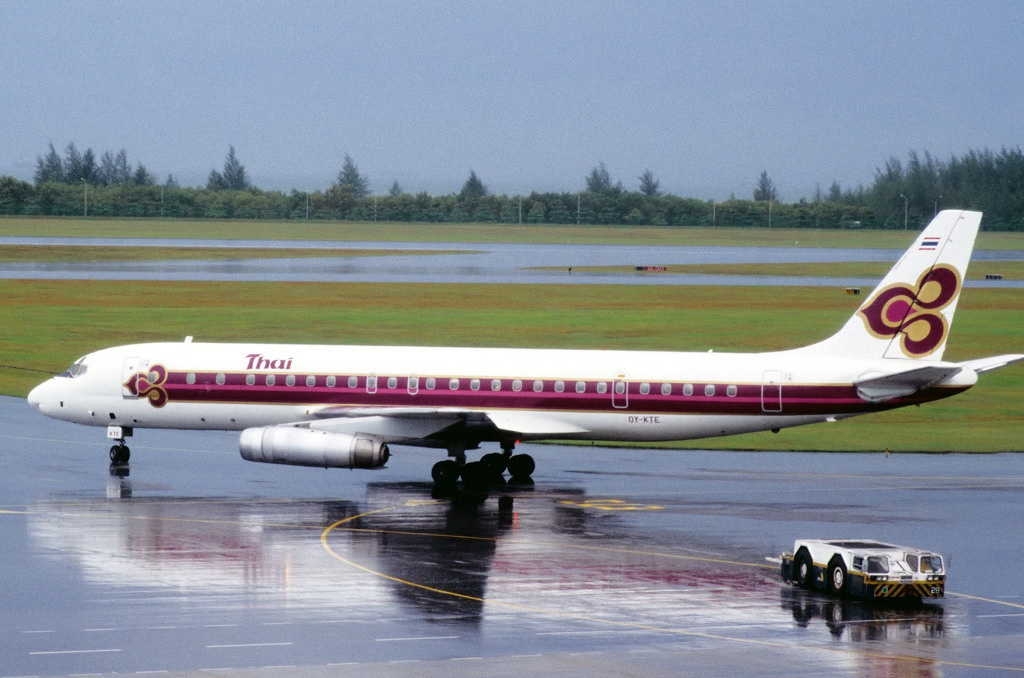
Douglas DC-8-62CF

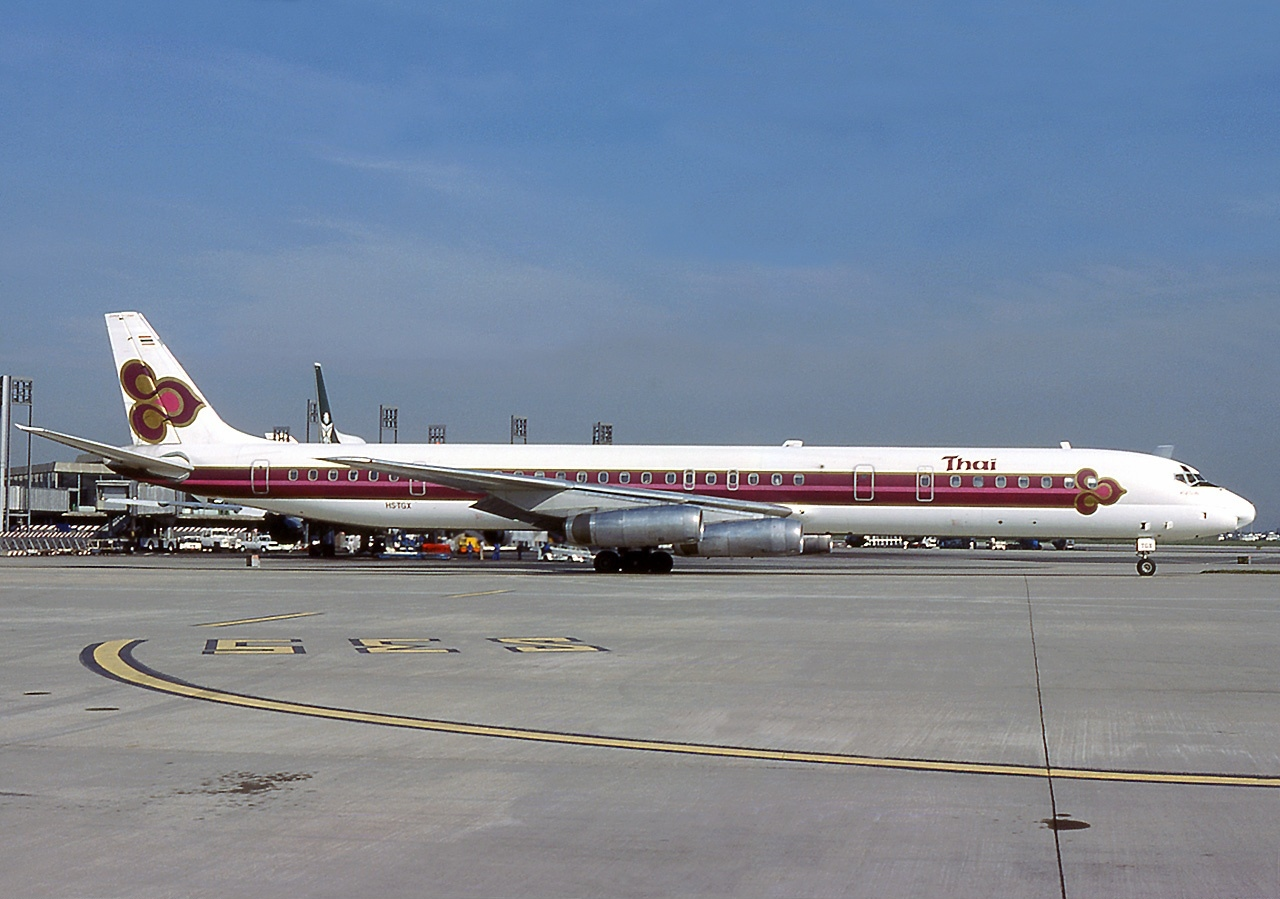
Douglas DC-8-63

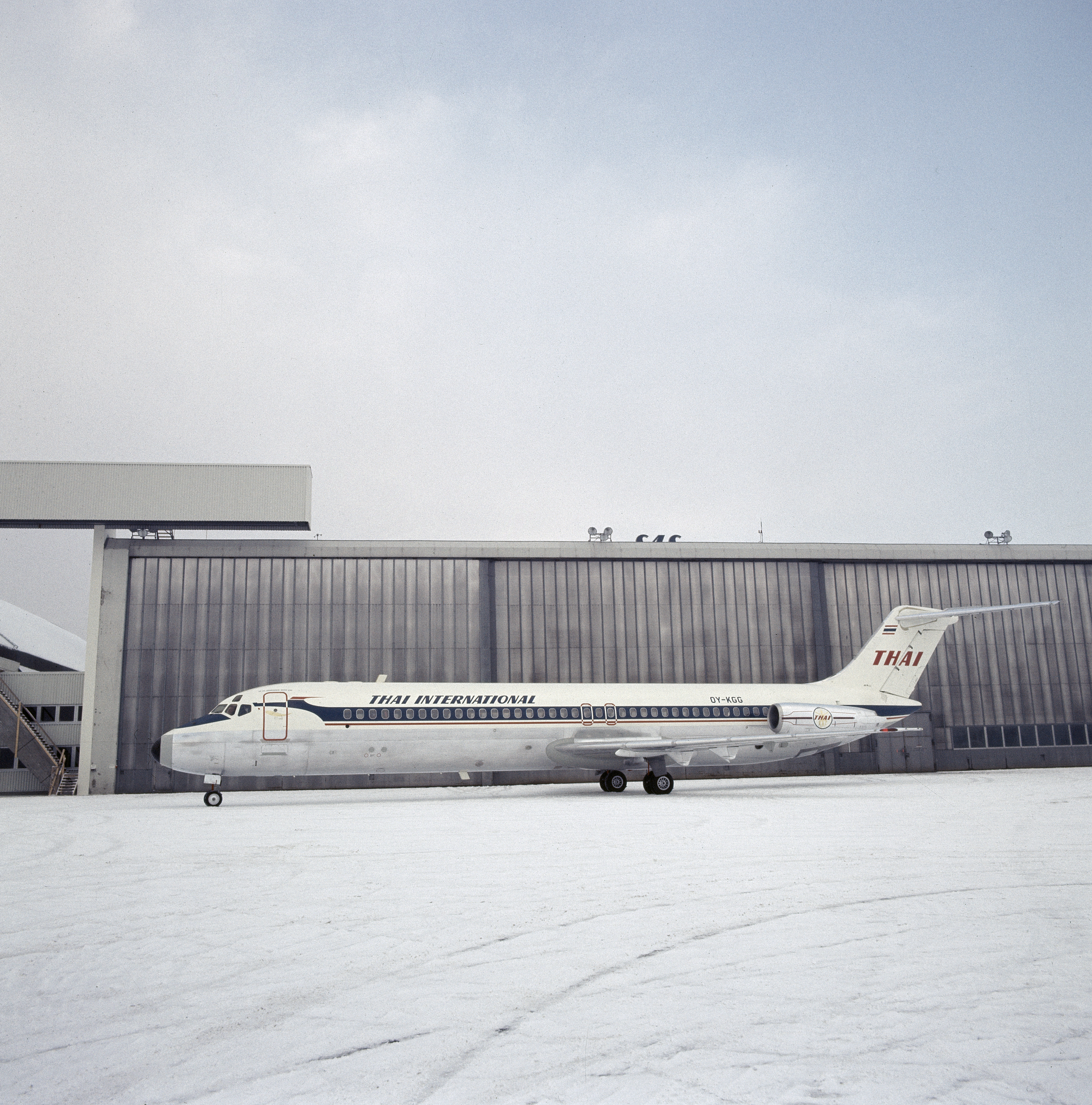
Douglas DC-9-41

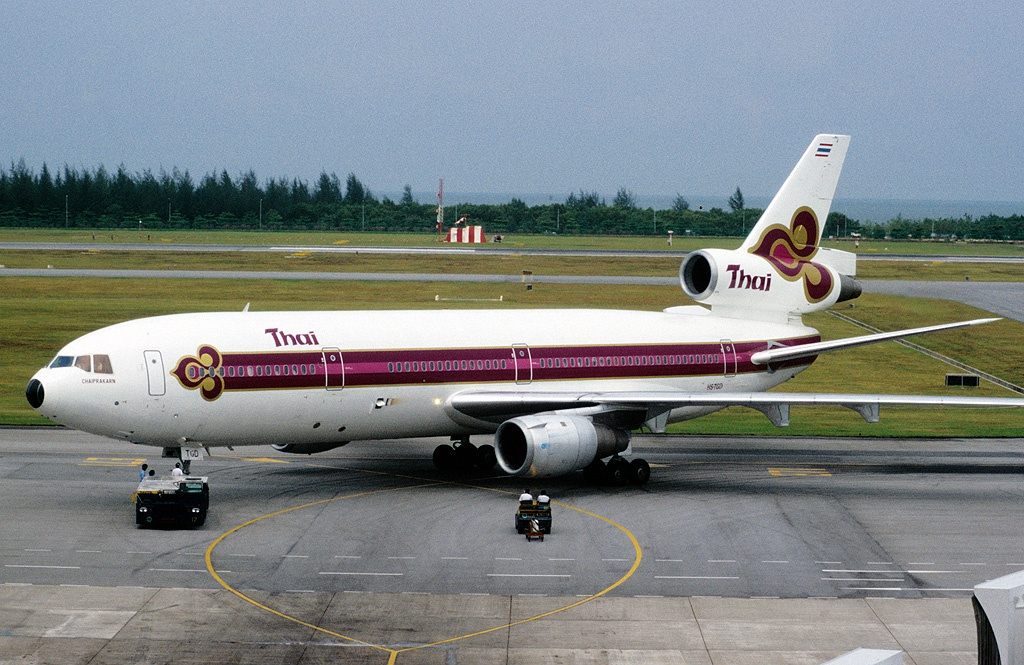
McDonnell Douglas DC-10-30

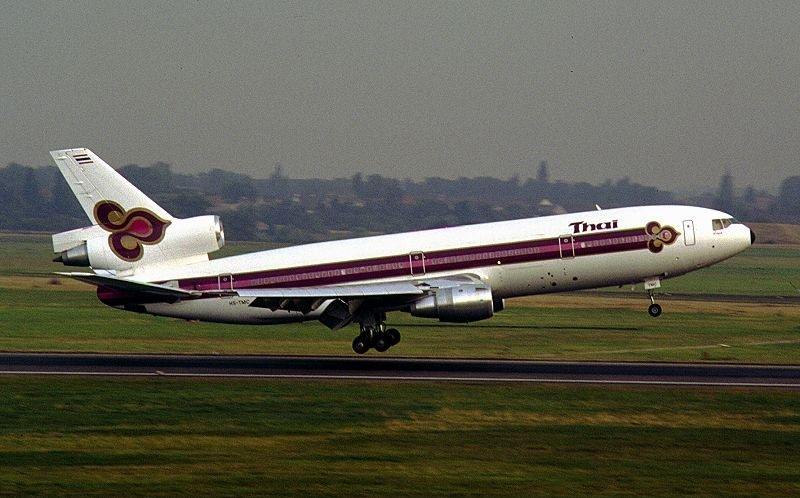
McDonnell Douglas DC-10-30ER

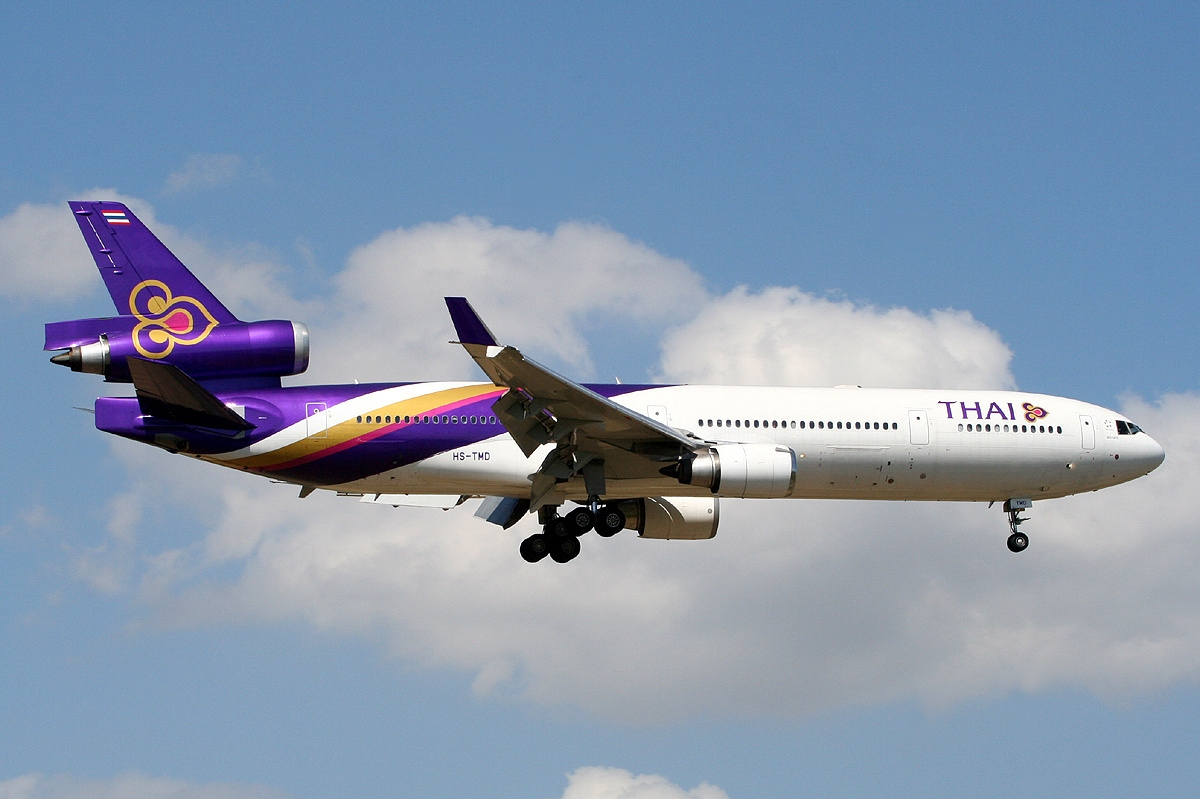
McDonnell Douglas MD-11
