= China Airlines incidents and accidents =

China Airlines has been in operation since 1959. The first China Airlines accident occurred in 1969 as flight 227. The company was known for a very poor safety record before the 2010s: Between 1990 and 2002, six major accidents occurred, with hundreds of deaths. An urban legend that China Airlines would have a major accident every four years was widely spread among Taiwanese people at the time, which was known as the "Four-year deadline of China Airlines" (華航四年大限).

The local public started discussing the aviation safety of China Airlines after flight 140, the deadliest accident on China Airlines and the second-deadliest accident in Japan. Most comments suggested cultural influences were contributors to the airline's safety issues. The Japanese government asked China Airlines to improve flight operations and aircraft maintenance after flight 140. Hsu Li-teh, then president of China Aviation Development Foundation, suggested that the problem with China Airlines stems from the organisation's unclear status. It was difficult to determine whether China Airlines was a government agency or a private company.

Ping I Lee of Embry–Riddle Aeronautical University suggested that several characteristics of Chinese culture, such as collective thinking, belief of social pressure and encouraging cut corners, unconditional respect of figures of authority, including airline captains, were hazardous in aviation operations. Pilot selection and training processes were also contributing factors to the airline's poor safety. Most pilots of China Airlines in the 1990s were retired military aviators, as Taiwan lacks general aviation. These pilots had been trained to accomplish combat missions at all costs and ignored flight safety. According to Lee, this approach was incompatible with air transport. The fact that most pilots were retired military aviators also made China Airlines a bureaucratic, inefficient entity lacking modern corporate management. Other contributing factors discussed included internal strife within the Kuomintang and China Airlines.

Improving the safety record therefore became the top priority for China Airlines managers. Under the management of Li Yun-Ning (Chinese: 李雲寧), pilots were asked to hold sessions twice a month and to submit detailed reports on daily flight delays, recurring malfunctions, and repair status. There were no major accidents after Flight 611.

== List ==
This list is about aviation incidents and accidents involving China Airlines. Elements were sorted by its flight number.

List of China Airlines incidents and accidents
Flight	Date	Death	Injured	Notes
006	February 19, 1985	0	24	
120	August 20, 2007	0	3	
140	April 26, 1994	264	7	The deadliest accident of China Airlines and the second deadliest accident in Japan
202	June 14, 2020	0	0	
204	October 26, 1989	54	0	
206	August 12, 1970	14	17	
227	January 2, 1969	24	0	First accident of China Airlines
334	May 3, 1986	0	0	
358	December 29, 1991	5	0	
605	November 4, 1993	0	10	
611	May 25, 2002	225	0	The deadliest accident in Taiwan
642	August 22, 1999	3	208	
676	February 16, 1998	196	0	Plus 7 death and 2 injured on the ground
811	February 27, 1980	5	37	
825	November 20, 1971	25	0	
831	March 9, 1978	1	2	
2265	February 16, 1986	13	0	

== See also ==
- Korean Air incidents and accidents
