= One-Two-Go Airlines Flight 269 =

2007 plane crash in Phuket, Thailand

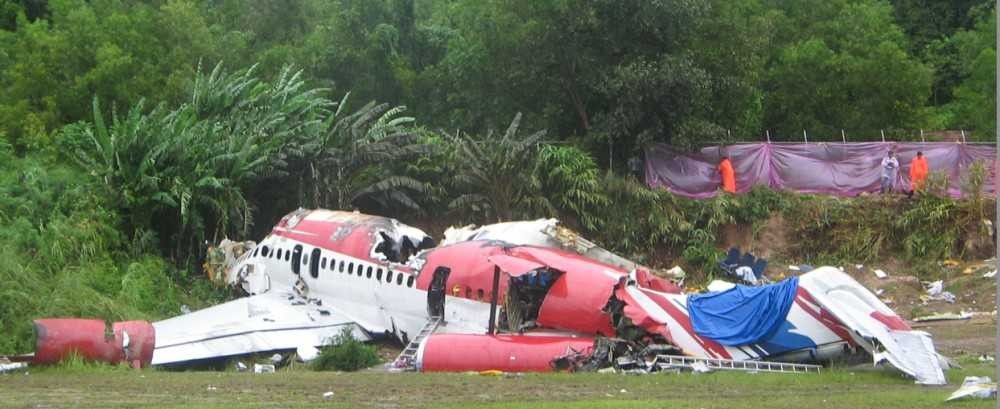
- The debris of Flight 269 after the crash

Accident
- Date: September 16, 2007
- Summary: Loss of control after a failed go-around attempt
- Site: Phuket International Airport, Phuket, Thailand; 08°06′51.2″N 98°19′10.4″E

Aircraft
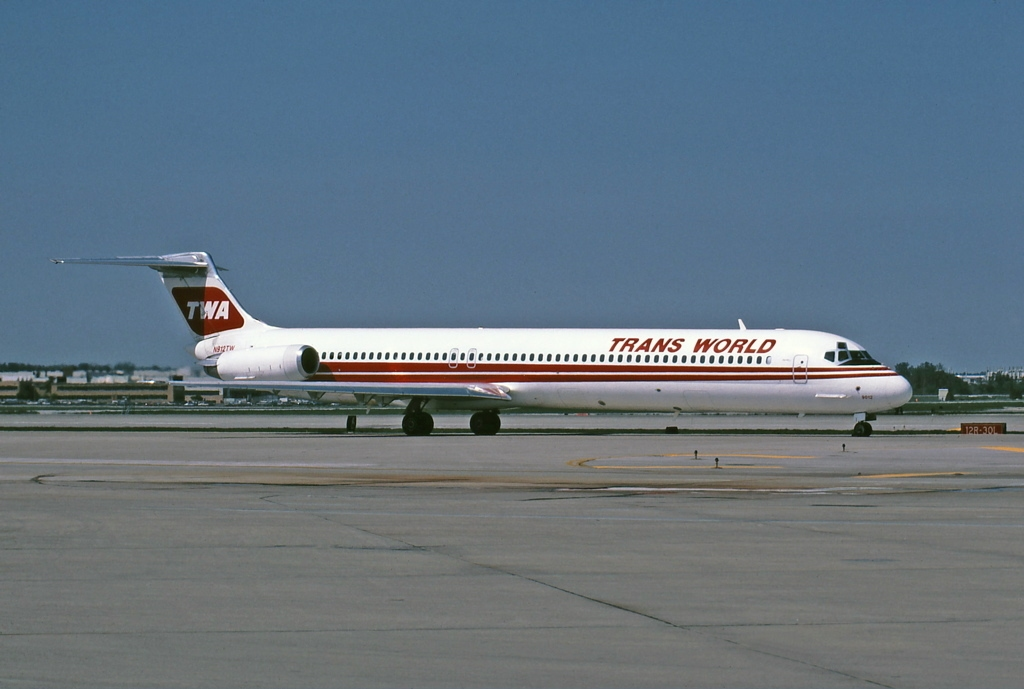
- The aircraft involved in the accident, pictured in 1985 while in service with Trans World Airlines
- Aircraft type: McDonnell Douglas MD-82
- Operator: One-Two-Go Airlines
- IATA flight No.: OG269
- ICAO flight No.: OTG269
- Call sign: THAI EXPRESS 269
- Registration: HS-OMG
- Flight origin: Don Mueang International Airport, Bangkok, Thailand
- Destination: Phuket International Airport, Phuket, Thailand
- Occupants: 130
- Passengers: 123
- Crew: 7
- Fatalities: 90
- Injuries: 40
- Survivors: 40

One-Two-Go Airlines Flight 269 (OG269/OTG269) was a scheduled domestic passenger flight from Bangkok to Phuket, Thailand. On 16 September 2007, about 15:41 ICT, the McDonnell Douglas MD-82 operating the flight crashed into an embankment beside runway 27 at Phuket International Airport (HKT) bursting into flames upon impact during an attempted go-around after an aborted landing, killing 90 of the 130 people on board (including one person who died of burn injuries several days after the crash). It is the third deadliest aviation incident to occur in Thailand. (Note: Behind Lauda Air Flight 004 and Thai Airways International Flight 261.)

The crash report was published by the Aircraft Accident Investigation Committee (AAIC) of the Ministry of Transport. A separate two-year report done by the United States National Transportation Safety Board (NTSB) was incorporated into the AAIC report. Both reports found that the captain and first officer had worked hours in excess of the legal flight limits; that the first officer attempted to transfer control to the captain during the go-around; that neither pilot initiated a go-around and that the training and safety programs at the airline were deficient.

Between 2009 and 2010, One-Two-Go Airlines was prohibited from operating in European Union nations due to safety concerns. At the time of the accident, the airline was owned by Orient Thai Airlines and in July 2010, it fully re-branded as Orient Thai Airlines.

== Flight ==
On the day of the crash, the McDonnell Douglas MD-82 departed Bangkok's Don Mueang International Airport, Thailand, at 14:31 en route to Phuket International Airport as flight number OG269. The flight crew consisted of Captain Arief Mulyadi (57), an Indonesian national and the Chief Pilot of One-Two-Go Airlines, a former Indonesian Air Force pilot; and First Officer Montri Kamolrattanachai (30), a Thai national who had recently completed his flight training with One-Two-Go's ab initio program. Arief had 16,752 flight hours, including 4,330 hours on the MD-82, while Montri (Note: Indonesian people legally have each one full, given name with no family name legally recognized. Thai people have family names, but are politely referred to by their given names, not their family names. See Indonesian name and Thai name) had 1,465 hours, 1,240 of them on the MD-82. The aircraft was carrying 123 passengers and seven crew members. OG269 was the fourth of six flights between Bangkok and Phuket that Arief and Montri were scheduled to fly that day.

On approach to Phuket, Captain Arief made several radio communications errors including read-back/hear-back communications and misstating their flight number. First Officer Montri was the pilot flying.

Another aircraft landed immediately prior to Flight 269 and experienced wind shear. That aircraft's captain contacted the tower and reported wind shear on final approach and cumulonimbus clouds over the airport, a report audible to all incoming aircraft. Air traffic control (ATC) requested Flight 269 acknowledge the weather information provided and re-state intentions. Captain Arief acknowledged the transmission and stated his intention to land.

== Crash ==
OG269 conducted an instrument landing system (ILS) approach just north of the centerline on runway 27. As the landing proceeded, ATC reported increasing winds at 240 degrees from 15–30 knots (28–56 km/h; 17–35 mph), then to 40 knots (74 km/h; 46 mph). Captain Arief acknowledged the reports. ATC requested intentions again. Captain Arief said, "Landing".

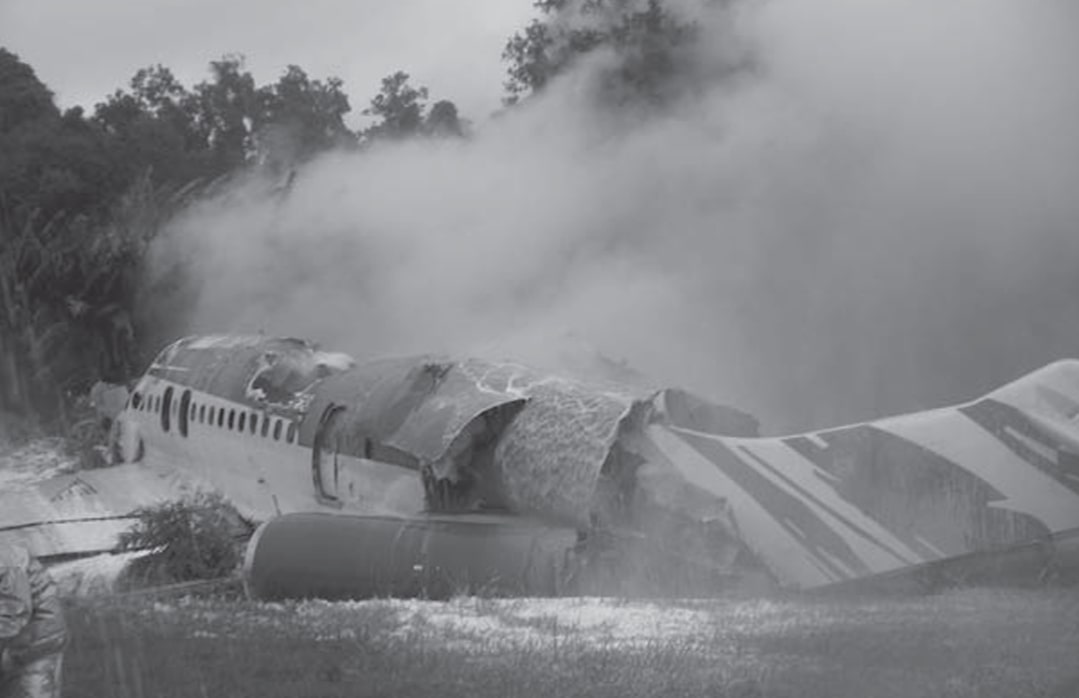
The wreckage of the aircraft

As the aircraft descended to 115 feet (35 m) above threshold level (ATL), its airspeed dropped. Captain Arief repeatedly called for more power as First Officer Montri attempted the landing. The aircraft continued to descend and fell below 50 feet (15 m) ATL, causing the autothrottle to reduce engine thrust to idle. One second later, First Officer Montri called "Go around". This was acknowledged by the captain. The first officer then attempted to transfer control of the aircraft to Captain Arief. There was no verbal acknowledgement of this from Captain Arief.

The pilots retracted the landing gear and set flaps for go-around. The aircraft pitch changed from 2 degrees to 12 degrees as the aircraft climbed, its engines still at idle. Airspeed fell and the aircraft climbed to a maximum altitude of 262 feet (80 m) ATL before beginning to descend. For 13 seconds the engines remained at idle. The aircraft pitch angle decreased to near zero and then the throttle was manually increased two seconds before impact with an embankment along the runway at 15:40. The aircraft was destroyed on impact along with a post-crash fire.

== Recovery ==
Immediate aftermath of the crash
- Video of the immediate aftermath of the crash

Rescue efforts were hampered by a 1.2-metre (4 ft) ditch beside and parallel to runway 27 running the length of the runway. Rescue vehicles were unable to cross this ditch, though they could have entered at either end of the runway, none did. One survivor complained that only a single ambulance arrived.

Additional fire and rescue from the town of Phuket arrived 30 minutes later. Additionally, the airport failed to include "crash on airport" procedures in its air service manual as required by ICAO.

== Aircraft ==
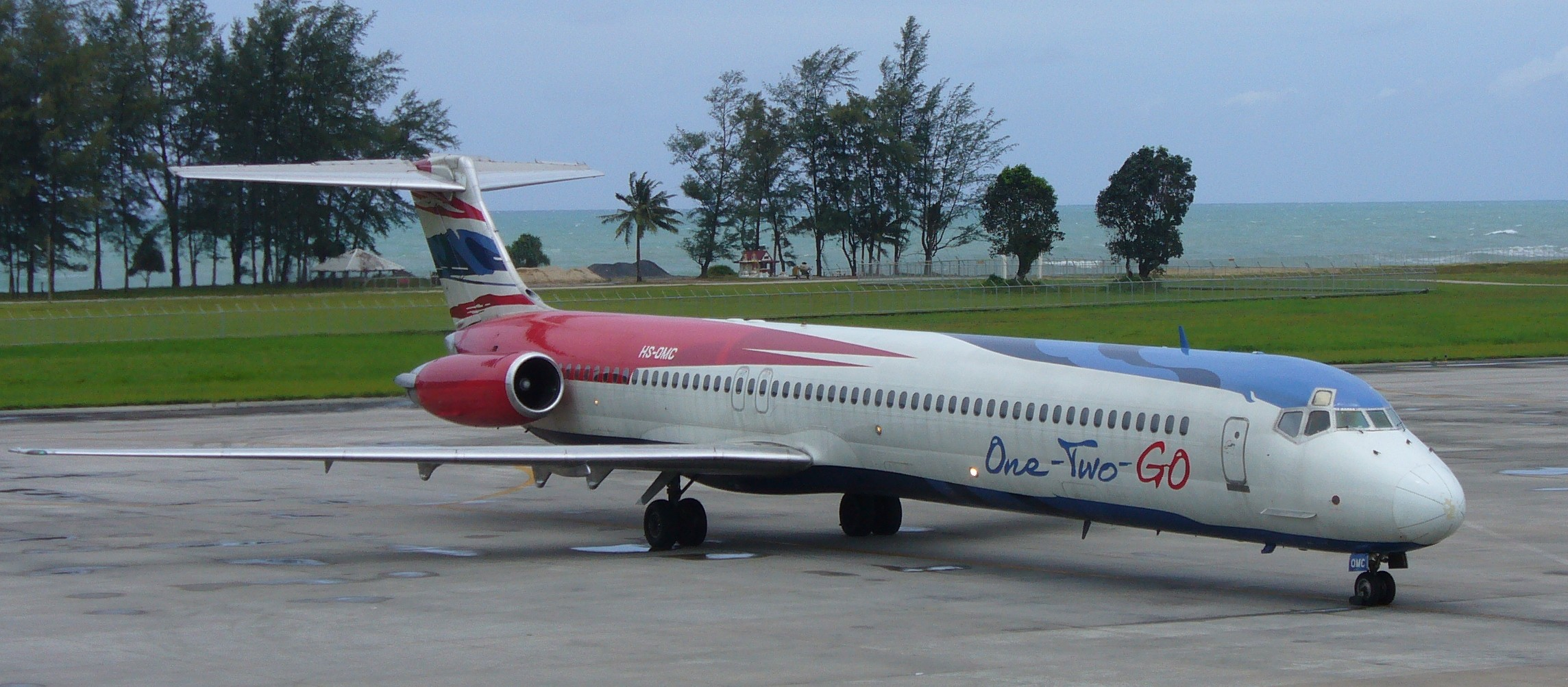
Before crashing, HS-OMG would have looked similar to this One-Two-GO MD-82 at Phuket International Airport.

The aircraft was a McDonnell Douglas MD-82, with line number 1129, manufacturer's serial number 49183, and registration N912TW, made its first flight on 13 November 1983, later delivered on 20 December 1983 and first operated by Trans World Airlines. When American Airlines merged with TWA, they got the MD-82 before One-Two-GO purchased it in February 2007, seven months before Flight 269. It was re-registered HS-OMG when it was bought.

== Survivors and fatalities ==
Of the 130 people on board, 85 passengers and five crew members (including both flight crew members) died.

The airline contacted the rest of the victims' families for evidence to aid in identification. Some victims suffered head injuries caused by dislodged baggage. Others were trapped and burned alive in the cabin. Many survivors sustained burns.

Various embassies and ministries in Bangkok confirmed the following numbers:

- Australian embassy: One Australian killed and one survived
  (National Nine News reported at 15:00 on 18 September that Australian foreign minister Alexander Downer and his department felt confident that no more than two Australians died in the crash.)
- Embassy of Iran and Radio Farda: 18 nationals dead
- British embassy: Eight Britons killed and at least two injured
- Canada: one killed and one injured
- French foreign ministry: Three French nationals killed, one injured, six never identified
- German officials: At least one German killed—a 29-year-old man, four injured
- Ireland foreign ministry: One Irish national killed
- Israel media: Eight Israelis killed, two injured (Ha'aretz)
- Swedish foreign ministry: Two Swedes killed—a 19-year-old female and a 20-year-old male, and two survived with minor injuries
- US embassy: Five American tourists killed

== Investigation ==
According to Vutichai Singhamany, a safety director at Thailand's Department of Civil Aviation and the lead crash investigator, the pilot had deployed the landing gear on approach to Phuket airport runway 27, but had retracted it when attempting a go-around. Singhamany added that the wheels had not touched the runway and that the accident had happened moments after the pilot raised the nose of the aircraft to abort the landing.

At the time of the crash, speculation rested on the pilot's decision to land in poor weather conditions and on the airport's wind shear detection system, which was not operational that day. In the weeks after the crash, Vutichai continued to indicate wind shear as the likely cause.

As the accident involved a U.S. manufactured aircraft, the United States National Transportation Safety Board (NTSB) participated in the accident and arrived on site within days. The NTSB inspected the aircraft and the crash scene, and interviewed survivors and witnesses. They took information obtained from the flight data recorder ("black box") to the United States for analysis. The flight data recorder immediately yielded significant facts about the flight, including:

- Wind shear was not a factor in the crash
- First Officer Montri was the pilot flying
- Captain Arief's radio communications with ATC were error prone
- Many crew resource management (CRM) issues occurred in the cockpit
- There was no conversation between the pilots during the final 18 seconds of flight
- The takeoff/go-around switch (TO/GA), used to configure the aircraft for go-around, had not been pushed
- The throttle was pushed to take-off power only two seconds before impact

== Conclusions ==
After completing the inspection of the aircraft, the NTSB found it to have functioned properly and to have remained fully controllable until impact. The cause of the crash was found to be due to a combination of human performance and operational issues, including:

Human Performance:

- CRM issues, including attempted transfer of control of the aircraft at a critical moment
- Failure of either pilot to apply power while attempting to regain altitude
- Fatigue issues as both pilots had worked excessive hours for the week and the month

Operational:

- Lack of governance in the corporate culture at One-Two-Go airlines
- Failure of One-Two-Go to complete pilot proficiency checks as required by law
- Training on a simulator that did not include wind shear alerting and did not match the configuration of One-Two-Go's MD-82s.

The NTSB noted that, "although the weather deteriorated in the later stages of this flight, wind shear was not a factor in this accident" and "It is understood that during the accident sequence, the pilots were potentially distracted by the weather conditions; however, that distraction should not cause a loss of control of the airplane."

The NTSB stated that the possible causes of this accident, consistent with available evidence, are that: The crew did not properly perform the go-around and failed to activate the TO/GA switch. Although the throttles remained available to the crew to advance power, they did not, nor did they monitor the throttles during the go-around. A transfer of controls, from the copilot to the pilot, occurred at a critical point in the go-around. The airplane's flight management system automatically retarded the throttles, since the approach slat/flap logic for landing was met. Lacking power application, the airplane slowed and descended until contact with the terrain.

The Thai Aircraft Accident Investigation Committee (AAIC) added that the flight crew did not follow the standard operating procedure of a stabilized approach, call outs, and emergency situations as specified in the airline's flight operation manual. Their co-ordination was insufficient, they had heavy workloads and accumulated stress, had insufficient rest, and were fatigued. The weather conditions changed suddenly prompting the go-around attempt.

== Aftermath ==
On 28 July 2008, the Thai Department of Civil Aviation (DCA) censured Orient Thai Airlines and One-Two-Go airlines over a number of issues, including:

- Failure to have safety and oversight programs to ensure pilots were properly trained and certified
- Failure to have a system and oversight over a system to ensure pilots met and did not exceed duty time limitations
- Committing offense and breaking the law by submitting deceptive check ride reports by MD-80 pilots

The air operator's certificate (AOC) of One-Two-Go Airlines was revoked, grounding the airline for 30 days.

In April 2009, One-Two-Go Airlines was added to the EU blacklist. It was removed shortly thereafter. In September 2010, the One-Two-Go brand was dropped and the airline was merged with Orient Thai Airlines.

== In popular culture ==
- Modernine TV discussed One-Two-Go Airlines Flight 269 on TimeLine, 26 June 2017, in "Dead Landing".
- Thai PBS discussed One-Two-Go Airlines Flight 269 on TruthNeverDies, 15 July 2020, in "OG269 Dead Landing".

== See also ==
- Ground proximity warning system
- List of accidents and incidents involving airliners by location
- Low level windshear alert system

Similar crashes

- China Airlines Flight 140 (1994)
- Thai Airways International Flight 261 (1998)
- Emirates Flight 521 (2016)
