= B-1870 =

B-1870 may refer to:

- China Airlines Flight 831
- China Airlines Flight 2265
