= Thai Airways International Flight 261 =

1998 aviation accident in Thailand

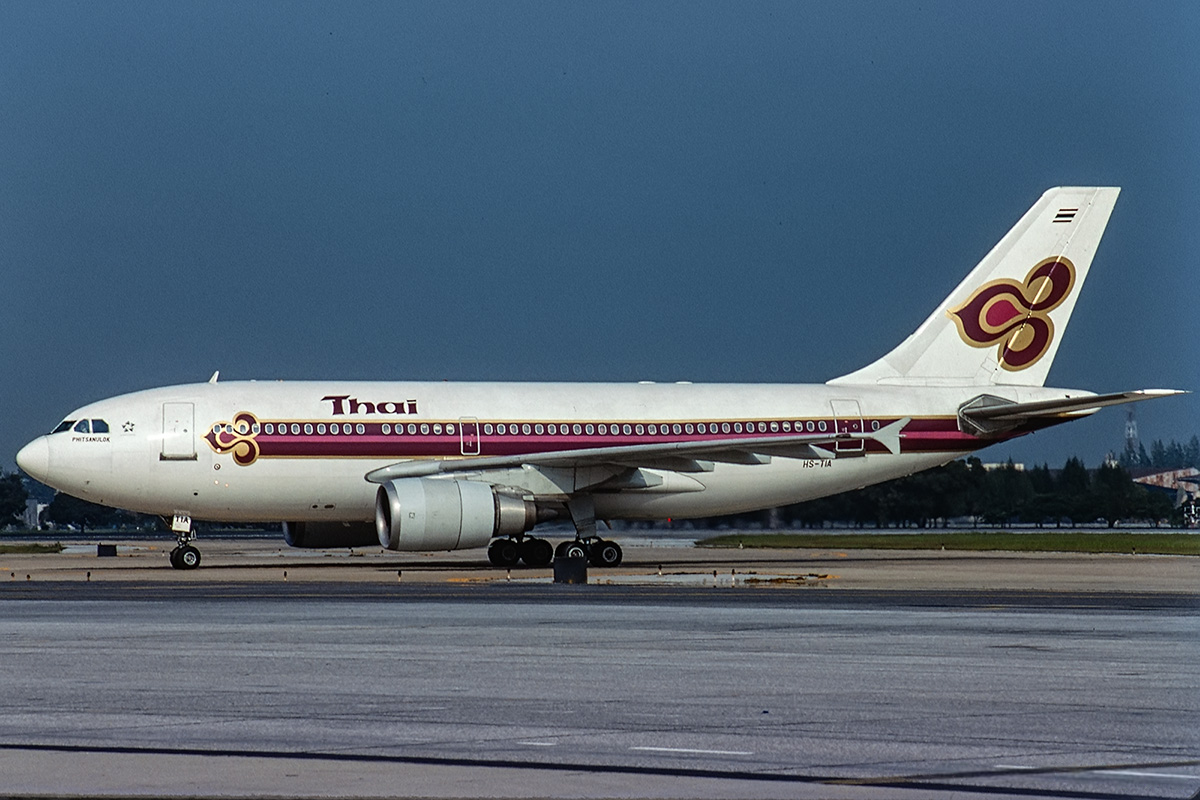
- HS-TIA, the aircraft involved in the accident, photographed in October 1998

Accident
- Date: 11 December 1998
- Summary: Stalled during approach due to pilot error and spatial disorientation
- Site: 700 m S of Surat Thani International Airport (URT) (Thailand); 09°7′42″N 99°8′17″E

Aircraft
- Aircraft type: Airbus A310-204
- Aircraft name: Phitsanulok
- Operator: Thai Airways International
- IATA flight No.: TG261
- ICAO flight No.: THA261
- Call sign: THAI 261
- Registration: HS-TIA
- Flight origin: Don Mueang International Airport
- Destination: Surat Thani International Airport
- Occupants: 146
- Passengers: 132
- Crew: 14
- Fatalities: 101
- Injuries: 45
- Survivors: 45

Thai Airways International Flight 261 was a scheduled domestic passenger flight from Bangkok's Don Mueang International Airport to Surat Thani International Airport in Surat Thani, Thailand. The flight was operated by Thai Airways International, the flag carrier of Thailand. On 11 December 1998, the aircraft, an Airbus A310 registered in Thailand as HS-TIA, stalled and crashed into a swamp during its landing attempt at Surat Thani Airport. A total of 101 people were killed in the crash.

Thailand's Aircraft Accident Investigation Committee (AAIC) opened an investigation into the accident. The investigation revealed that the crew were disoriented. As their attempts to land at the airport had failed multiple times, the crew became upset, causing them not to maintain awareness of the condition of their aircraft until it started to enter an upset condition. The pilots failed to recover the aircraft and the aircraft crashed into the swamp.

The accident was the second-deadliest plane crash in Thailand, behind Lauda Air Flight 004. It is currently the fifth-worst accident involving the Airbus A310, the fourth hull loss of the type.

== Aircraft ==
The aircraft with registration HS-TIA was an Airbus A310-204, c/n 415.

== Passengers and crews ==
Flight 261 was carrying 132 passengers and 14 crew members. There were 25 foreigners on board the flight, including nationals of Austria, Australia, Britain, Finland, Germany, Israel, Japan, Norway, Pakistan and the United States. The rest of the passengers were Thais. Among the passengers were Siriwan, the sister of Thai Transport and Communications Minister Suthep Thaugsuban, Thai actor and singer Ruangsak Loychusak, and Thawat Wichaidit, a Member of Parliament from Surat Thani.

The captain, Pinit Vechasilp, had 10,167 flight hours, including 3,000 hours on the Airbus A300-600/A310.

The first officer, Saen Chalermsaenyakorn, had 2,839 flight hours, with 983 of them on the Airbus A300-600/A310.

== Accident ==
Flight TG261 departed from Bangkok's Don Mueang International Airport with 132 passengers and 14 crew members at 17:40 local time to Surat Thani, a gateway city for popular resort island of Koh Samui in Thailand. It was cleared to fly at flight level 310. The estimated flight time was one hour and 55 minutes. At the time, Thailand was hosting the 1998 Asian Games and many schools had been closed due to the event. Many Thais had headed to holiday resorts.

At 18:26 local time, the co-pilot contacted Surat Thani controller for approach. The aircraft, at the time, was located at 70 nautical miles (130 km; 81 mi) from the airport. Surat Thani approach control cleared the flight for an VOR/DME non-precision approach to runway 22. The weather at Surat Thani Airport was 1500 metres visibility with calm winds and a cloud base of 1,800 ft (550 m) above ground level, temperature and dew point 24 and 22°C.

At 18:39 local time, the co-pilot reported Flight 261's position over the intermediate fix. Surat Thani controller then stated that the Precision Approach Path Indicator (PAPI) on the right side of the runway 22 was not functional and the PAPI indicator on the left side was in use. Two minutes later, Flight 261 was cleared to land. The flight crews were cautioned due to slippery runway due to recent rain. The wind was 310 degrees at 5 knots

At 18:42 local time, the runway was sighted and the pilots attempted to land the aircraft. They then decided to go-around for a second approach. The flight was cleared for its second landing attempt. This time, however, the pilots could not see the runway and opted for another go-around.

At 19:05 local time, the flight crews were informed of the weather in the area, which the crew members acknowledged. The weather had deteriorated, the visibility decreased from 1,500 to 1,000 metres (4,900 to 3,300 ft) which was now less than allowed for the type of non-precision approach in use. The pilots informed the passengers of the deteriorating weather conditions and announced that they would attempt another landing for the third time and if they failed again they would divert back to Bangkok.

During the go-around, the angle of attack of the aircraft gradually increased from 18 degrees to 48 degrees. The speed of the aircraft began to decay and the aircraft began to shake. It entered an aerodynamic stall. As it began to shake, surviving flight attendants recounted that passengers began to scream and jump out of their seats, with luggage reportedly "flying around everywhere".

The Airbus A310 crashed into swampy ground near a flooded rubber plantation and exploded, bursting into flames. The crash site was located 700 metres (2,297 ft) from the runway. Many of the occupants were drowned by the waist-deep water, while the remaining survivors had to crawl to escape from the wreckage. Local residents immediately rushed to the crash site to rescue the survivors. Search and rescue operation was hampered by the location of the crash, which was in a swamp. Rescuers reported that most of the survivors were seated at the front portion of the aircraft.

More than 400 soldiers and police were deployed to assist in the rescue operation. By 12 December, rescuers had managed to retrieve 100 bodies from the crash site. Depletion of emergency resources caused the set up of a makeshift morgue at the airport. The bodies were laid in the main lobby and body bags were opened to give relatives identification access, but many of the bodies were burnt beyond recognition, causing difficulties in the identification process. Identification of the victims was also hampered by the fact that passengers were not required to fill a next of kin form for a domestic flight.

Search operations were suspended on 13 December after the last victim was recovered. In total, 101 passengers and crew, including both the pilot and the co-pilot, were killed in the crash. Forty-five people survived, with 30 people suffering serious injuries. Among the survivors were 12 foreigners (three Australians, three Japanese, three Germans, two Israelis, one Briton) and Thai actor and singer Ruangsak Loychusak. Siriwan, the sister of Thai Minister of Transport and Communications of Thailand Suthep Thaugsuban, and Thawat Wichaidit, a Member of Parliament from Surat Thani, were among those killed.

== Investigation ==
A search for the flight's black boxes was immediately conducted. The search was initially hampered due to the ground conditions at the crash site. Both the flight data recorder (FDR) and the cockpit voice recorder (CVR) were eventually found by the search and rescue team, and were taken from the crash site for further investigation. Both recorders were sent to the National Transportation Safety Board (NTSB) in the United States for readout analysis. Pieces of the wreckage were recovered and were taken off site for further inspection by Thai investigators. Airbus, the aircraft manufacturer, announced that they would send a team of specialists to assist Thai authorities in the crash investigation.

=== Mobile phone usage ===
There were fears that the use of mobile phones on board the aircraft had caused it to crash. Investigators tried to probe whether there was a link between the use of mobile phones and the crash. According to the investigation, only a few studies had been conducted on the effect of mobile phones to aircraft's equipment. There was no evidence that the use of mobile phones would interfere with the aircraft's navigation system, communication and even the operation of the aircraft as a whole. At the time, the Federal Aviation Administration had no policy on in-flight mobile phone use.

Both flight recorders did not register any abnormalities of the navigation aids nor on the flight control system. The possibility that the use of mobile phone had caused the crash, therefore, was dismissed.

=== Landing difficulty ===
In the initial aftermath of the accident, many believed that the weather played a major factor in the disaster. A heavy rainstorm caused by Tropical Storm Gil was reportedly present prior to Flight 261's landing. Several survivors and victims relatives questioned the pilots' decision to land at the airport even though the weather was not in acceptable condition for landing. Airline officials had told crew members to fly according to the company's procedures, in which pilots should not land if the meteorological condition in the area was inclement. Investigators stated that bad weather was the probable cause of the accident, without ruling out pilot error. Other possible causes were also being investigated.

According to the available weather data, at the time of the accident the wind was blowing at 3 knots (5.6 km/h; 3.5 mph) with visibility of 1,000 metres (3,300 ft) with rain reportedly present.

Reports also emerged that the runway at Surat Thani Airport was lacking an essential navigation system. Airport officials only commented that the radio navigation system was working normally and declined to comment further on the issue. Thai officials confirmed that a part of the navigation system, called the Instrument landing system (ILS), had to be taken off-line due to an expansion program at the airport. The system was scheduled to be put back online; however, the subsequent 1997 Asian financial crisis caused it to be postponed. A Thai air force pilot stated that, due to the removal of the instrument landing system (ILS), pilots had to use a radio navigation system which was less accurate.

The investigation further revealed that the airport's non-directional beacon (NDB) had also been turned off.

At the time of the accident, several lights at the runway end were unlit due to a renovation at the airport. This caused the distance between the lights to change to a distance of 6 metres (20 ft) between each other rather than the usual 3 metres (10 ft). The approach lights were also not turned on. The inclement weather and the unlit condition of the runway would make it harder for the pilots to see the runway and to land at the airport.

=== Factors leading to stall ===
In all of the flight crew's attempts to approach Surat Thani, the pilots always saw the runway to their right rather than ahead. This was caused by the placement of the VOR (used as an approach aid by the airport), which was located at the left side of the runway (track 225 degree). Flight 261 was on a 215 degree track with visibility less than 2,000 metres (6,600 ft). As such, the pilots were able to see the runway only if they had passed the runway centreline. In all of their attempts to land, they were too far left of the runway. It was a difficult approach for the pilots and this might explain why the flight had gone through multiple go-around attempts. Additionally, the pilots were not familiar with this non-precision approach.

During the first attempt, the wind was calm and the visibility was 1,500 metres (4,900 ft). The co-pilot sighted the runway and the pilot tried to land. However, the pilot announced that they were unable to land and decided to go-around. As they initiated the go-around, the pilot noticed the high rate of climb of the aircraft. The co-pilot stated that it might have been caused by the light weight of the aircraft (Flight 261 was 102 tonnes while its maximum permissible landing weight was 122 tonnes). The engines gradually increased and there was a low pitching up moment. Investigators noted that no signs of pilot fatigue were found in the first go-around attempt.

In the second attempt, the pilots decided to use the autopilot but were again unable to see the runway, possibly due to the unlit condition of several runway lights. The pilots then decided to go-around with the autopilot and autothrottle.

In the third attempt, the controller in Surat Thani informed the flight crew that the visibility had deteriorated to 1,000 metres; both pilots were worried about this. The co-pilot then reported "final approach fix", the controller cleared Flight 261 to land and the pilots disengaged autopilot.

The flight crew of Flight 261 had attempted to land at the airport at least twice. At the time of the accident, the flight crew were attempting their third attempt. If they failed all three attempts, then the flight would have to return to Bangkok, even though they had arrived at the destination airport. The low visibility, unsuccessful landing attempts in Surat Thani, and the possibility of going back to Bangkok caused a heavy workload with the pilots of Flight 261. The flight crew's attention was channeled due to the stress, causing them to lose situational awareness.

The aircraft involved in the accident was an Airbus A310, a medium range airliner equipped with two large turbo fan engines, both of which were located under swept wings. According to investigators, if the pilots decided to trigger the go-around using go-around mode, the autothrottle system would move the throttle forward at a rate of 8 degrees per second, causing the aircraft's nose to pitch up. If autopilot was used, the pitch attitude would be automatically regulated. However, if manual controls were used, the plane's attitude would be difficult to determine, increasing the likelihood of a stall.

The pilots were manually flying the aircraft in their third landing attempt and were unable to see the runway until they were too close. The flight crew then declared "cannot land, cannot land" and decided to go-around. The go-around button (autothrottle) was engaged and the engines spun from 59% to 102% in a span of 8 seconds, causing the aircraft to quickly pitch up, which was described by a surviving flight attendant as "the pilots pulling up the aircraft harshly".

The pitch continued to increase and the pilots tried to level out with the aircraft's elevator, but only managed to decrease the pitch rate a small amount. It then increased again, reaching as high as 40 degrees. The elevator was again engaged and the pitch decreased to 32-33 degrees for approximately 6 seconds. The pilots then suddenly did not apply the elevator anymore, causing the pitch to increase to 47-48 degrees. By this time, the speed had decayed to 100 knots (185 km/h; 115 mph). The aircraft then entered a stall and crashed into the swamp.

=== Management oversight ===
In the same year, Thai Airways International began reducing the number of its foreign pilots. Vice-president of the company, Chamlong Poompuang, stated that pilots were trained to exercise high caution. At the same time, he recognized that the airline had undertaken fuel-saving measures due to the economic downturn, but that flight operations should not be performed if safety was compromised. Thai Airways International chairman Thamnoon Wanglee emphasized, "Safety is our highest priority. What our policy is, and what happened, are two different things."

=== Conclusion ===
Thailand's Aircraft Accident Investigation Committee concluded the cause of the crash as follows:

After careful consideration, the Aircraft Accident Investigation Committee of the Kingdom of Thailand ultimately came to the conclusion that the accident occurred because the aircraft entered into a stall condition which might be caused by the following:

1. The pilot attempted to approach the airport in lower than minimum visibility with rain.
2. The pilot could not maintain the VOR course as set forth in the approach chart. The aircraft flew left of VOR course on every approach.
3. The pilots suffered from the accumulation of stress and were not aware of the situation until the aircraft entered the situation.
4. The pilots had not been informed of the document concerning the wide-body airplane upset recovery provided by Airbus Industries for use in pilot training.
5. The lighting system and approach chart did not facilitate the low visibility approach.
6. Stall warning and pitch trim systems might not fully function as described in the FCOM and AMM.

— Aircraft Accident Investigation Committee of the Kingdom of Thailand, "Aircraft Accident Investigation Report"

== Aftermath ==
Thai Airways International offered compensation payment to the families affected by the crash. Chairman Wanglee stated in a news conference that the families of the 101 victims of the crash would receive a compensation payment of US$100,000, while the 45 injured survivors would receive a compensation of 200,000 baht (US$5,600) each. The airline would pay the medical expenses of the injured.

== Television episodes ==
- Modernine TV discussed Thai Airways International Flight 261 on TimeLine, 30 May 2016, in "Flight 261 Disaster".
- The accident was covered by the "Mentour Pilot" Youtube channel in April, 2026.

== See also ==
- China Airlines Flight 140
