= Aircraft Accident Investigation Committee =

The Aircraft Accident Investigation Committee of Thailand (AAIC, Thai: คณะกรรมการสอบสวนกรณีอันเกี่ยวกับอุบัติเหตุของอากาศยานในราชอาณาจักร) is the aircraft accident and incident investigation committee of Thailand. It is subordinate to the Flight Standards Bureau, Department of Civil Aviation, Ministry of Transport.

== See also ==
- Lauda Air Flight 004
- One-Two-GO Airlines Flight 269
- Thai Airways International Flight 261
