= Surat Thani International Airport =

Airport in southern Thailand

Surat Thani International Airport ท่าอากาศยานสุราษฎร์ธานี
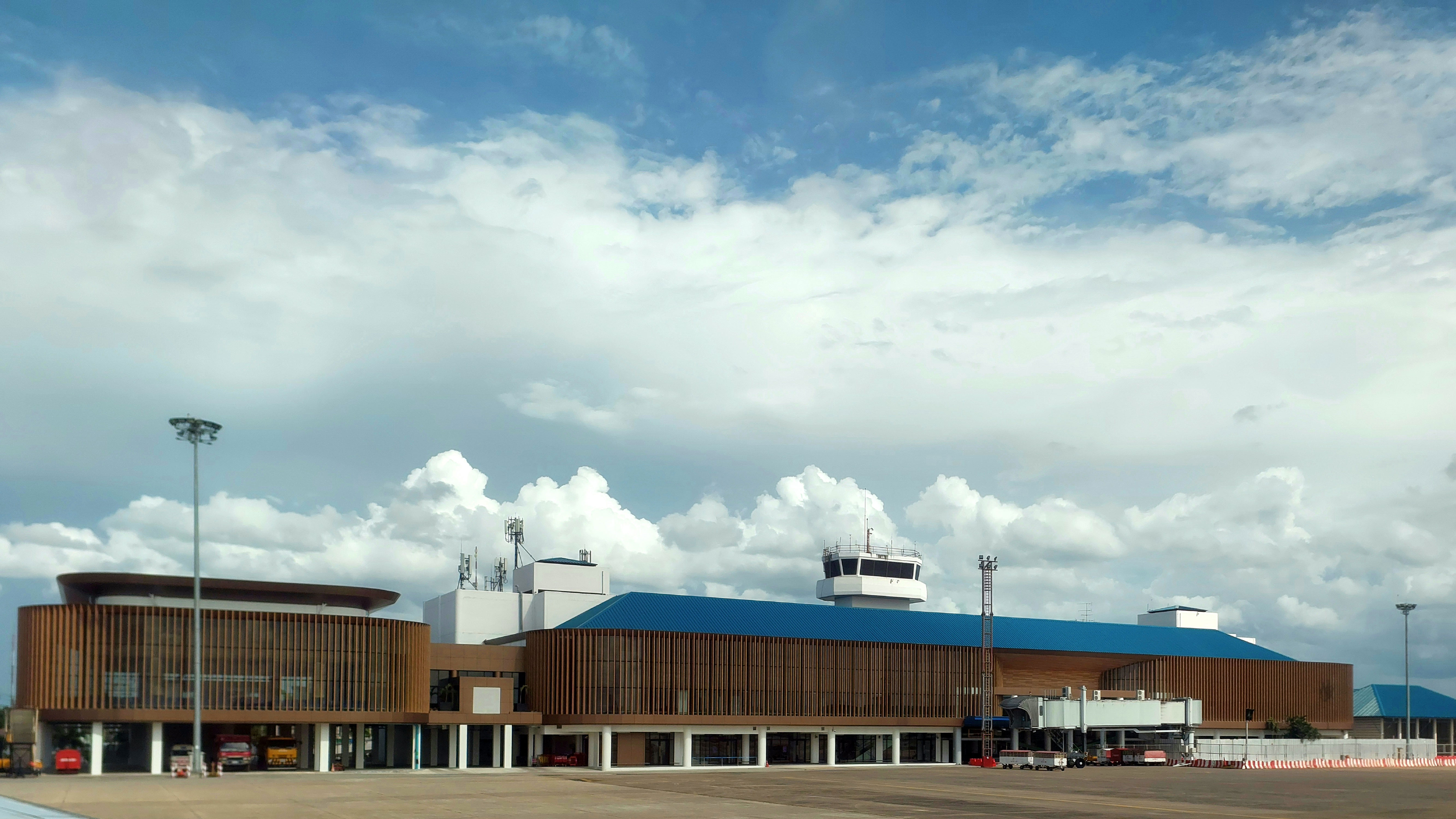
- IATA: URT; ICAO: VTSB

Summary
- Airport type: Public / Military
- Owner: Royal Thai Air Force
- Operator: Department of Airports
- Serves: Surat Thani
- Location: Tambon Hua Toei, Amphoe Phunphin, Surat Thani, Thailand
- Opened: 15 April 1981; 45 years ago
- Elevation AMSL: 6.1 m (20 ft)
- Coordinates: 09°07′57″N 99°08′08″E
- Website: minisite.airports.go.th/suratthani

Maps
- Location of airport in Thailand
- Interactive map of Surat Thani International Airport

Runways
Direction	Length		Surface
Direction	m	ft	Surface
04/22	3,000	9,843	Asphalt

Helipads
Number	Length		Surface
Number	m	ft	Surface
	25	82

Statistics (2025)
- Total passengers: 1,516,470 ▲0.79%
- Aircraft movements: 9,692 ▲6.36%
- Freight (tonnes): 703.164 ▲6.87%
- Sources: Department of Airports

Surat Thani International Airport (IATA: URT, ICAO: VTSB) is an international airport in Tambon Hua Toei, Amphoe Phunphin, Surat Thani province in Southern Thailand. It is located 21 kilometres (13 mi) west of downtown Surat Thani, and is also home to the Royal Thai Air Force (RTAF) squadrons. It has a single paved runway and is the tenth-busiest airport in Thailand in terms of passengers, handling more than two million passengers annually.

== Airlines and destinations ==
Airlines	Destinations
EZY Airlines	Hua Hin
Nok Air	Bangkok–Don Mueang
Thai AirAsia	Bangkok–Don Mueang, Bangkok–Suvarnabhumi, Chiang Mai
Thai Lion Air	Bangkok–Don Mueang
Thai VietJet Air	Bangkok–Suvarnabhumi

== Statistics ==
=== Passengers ===
Year	Total passengers	Change	Total flights	Total cargo (tonnes)
2001	180,621		1,531	4,646.35
2002	163,321	▼9.58%	1,510	2,472.06
2003	162,661	▼0.40%	1,518	2,070.01
2004	202,250	▲24.34%	1,629	1,858.76
2005	206,342	▲2.02%	1,793	1,698.92
2006	291,094	▲41.07%	2,812	1,412.82
2007	359,467	▲23.49%	3,316	1,061.95
2008	344,748	▼4.09%	2,904	1,464.76
2009	394,096	▲14.31%	3,266	1,301.99
2010	505,776	▲28.34%	4,460	1,152.31
2011	595,184	▲17.68%	5,251	1,369.13
2012	816,484	▲37.18%	6,308	1,541.00
2013	1,080,508	▲32.34%	8,457	1,568.07
2014	1,319,660	▲22.13%	10,175	1,571.29
2015	1,856,315	▲40.67%	13,257	1,601.26
2016	2,032,042	▲9.47%	13,813	1,575.77
2017	2,247,344	▲10.60%	15,396	1,036.80
2018	2,108,289	▼6.19%	14,000	1,144.99
2019	1,864,997	▼11.54%	12,340	829.87

== History ==
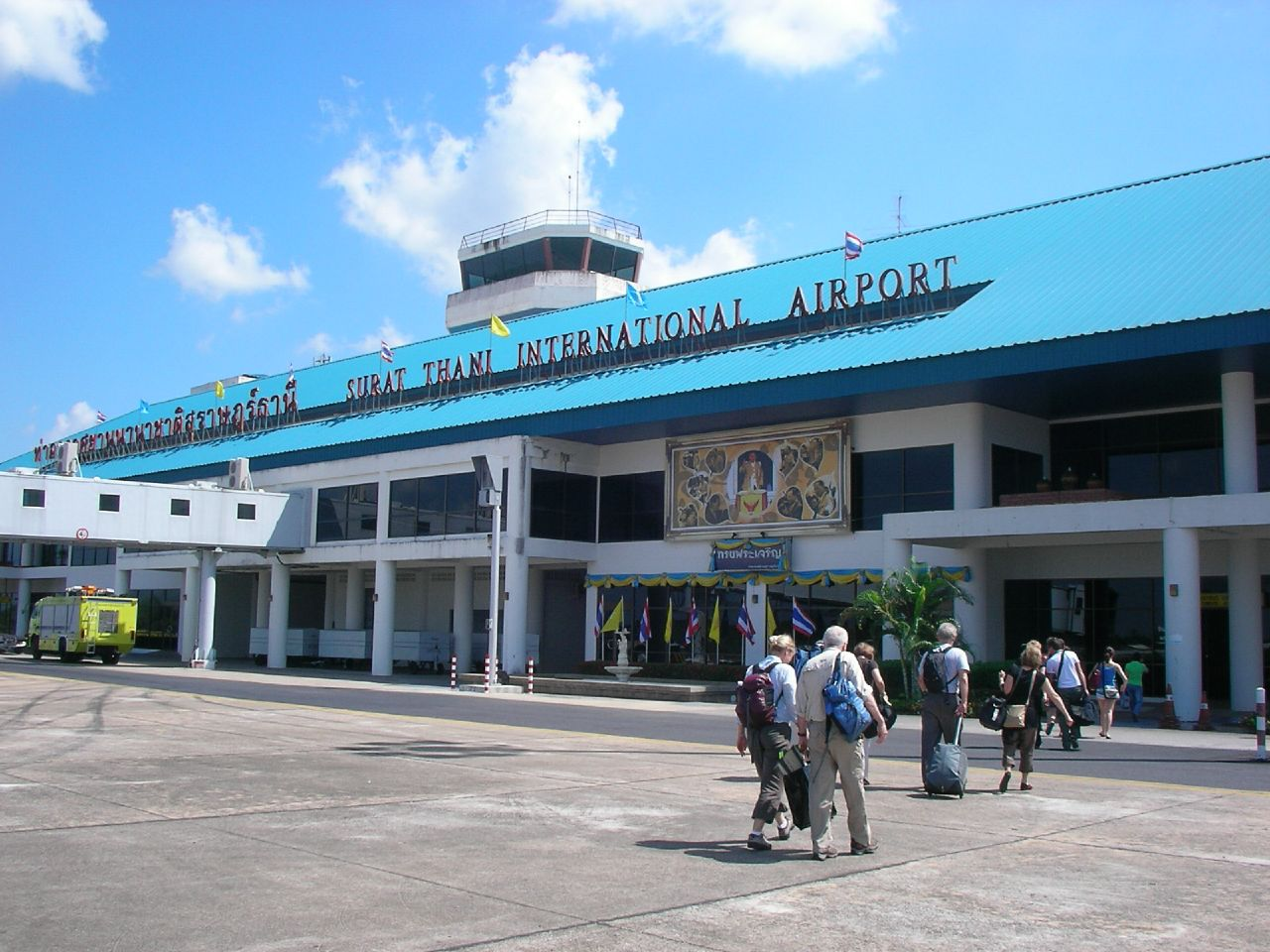
Surat Thani Airport in 2008

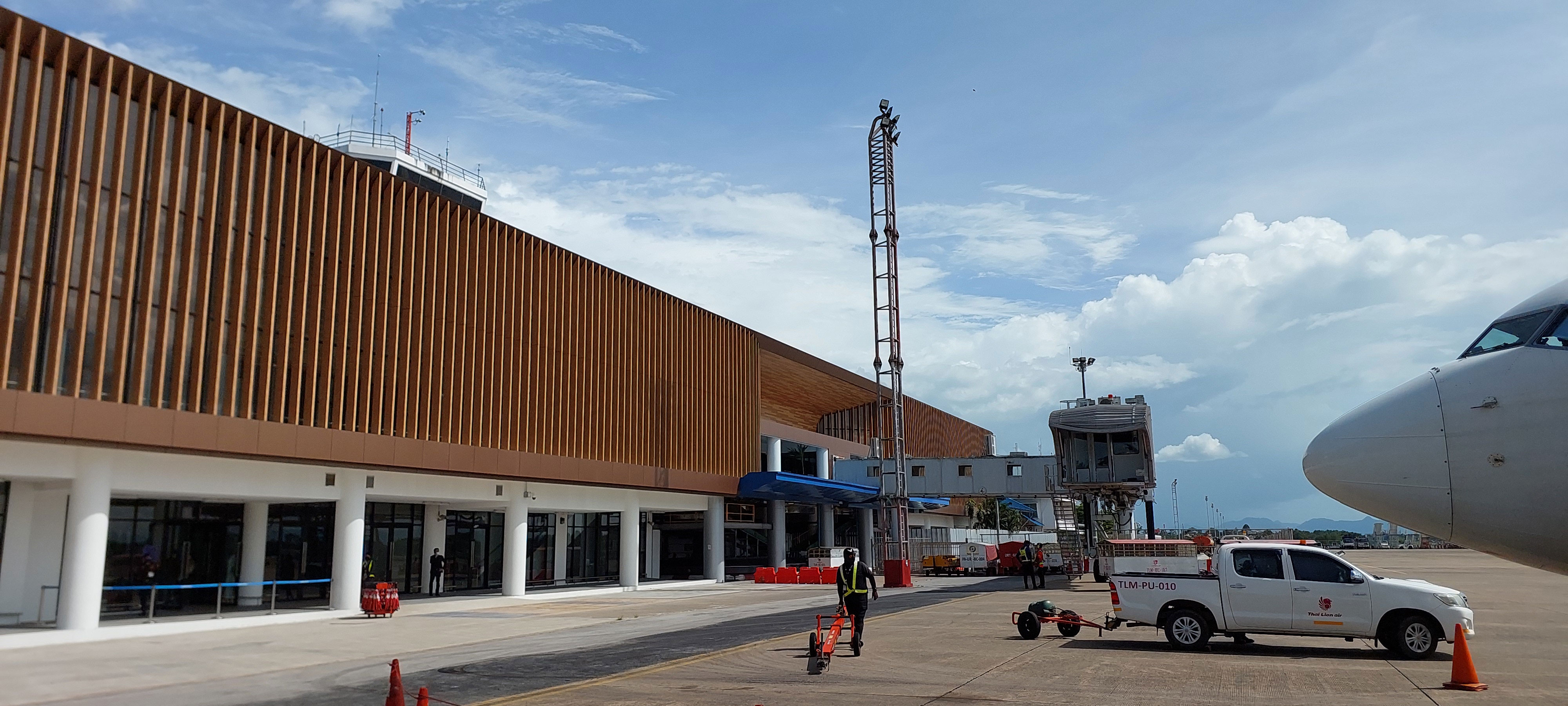
Surat Thani International Airport in May 2022

=== Donnok airport ===
Surat Thani Airport's predecessor is known locally as Donnok Airport (Thai: สนามบินดอนนก). It is located in Makham Tia subdistrict, Mueang Surat Thani district, around 3 km (1.9 mi) away from Surat Thani City, and has a single, gravel paved runway, 800 meters in length. Later, the runway was expanded by the Royal Thai Air Force to 1,000 metres, which was still only capable of handling small planes, such as the Douglas DC-3.

=== The current airport ===
Due to the original airport's close proximity to Surat Thani, the Civil Aviation Authority of Thailand (CAAT) planned a new airport away from the city. A former airfield used in World War II by the military was chosen as the site for the new airport. After the construction site was chosen, a plan for the airfield's development was proposed. However, in 1973, the government suspended the development project and used the funds to support Phuket International Airport's operations instead.

In 1975, many residents in Surat Thani called for the project's reconsideration. The Ministry of Defence and CAAT showed interest in the project and the airfield's development began in 1978. The airport was officially opened on 15 April 1981. It had a single runway, 2,500 metres in length. In 1993, the runway was expanded to support larger commercial flights and military operations.

=== Future upgrades and developments ===
The Department of Airports announced a 1.7 billion Baht plan to upgrade the airport. Details of the project are as following:

1. The airport's apron will be expanded to increase its capacity up to 11 Boeing 737s at a time.
2. The electrical system and wires will be moved underground.
3. The airport terminal will be expanded to accommodate up to 3.6 million passengers a year. The car park will also be expanded to handle up to 700 cars at a time.
4. The runway will be upgraded to increase its strength.
5. Construction of the new transportation center to handle more passengers.

== Military use ==
As well as being a commercial facility, Surat Thani Airport is an active RTAF base, the home of 4th Air Division/7th Wing Air Combat Command. 701 Squadron, "Shark", flies twelve SAAB JAS-39 C/D Gripen fighter aircraft. 702 Squadron operates two airborne early warning (AEW) and two transport SAAB SF340 airplanes. A further two SF340s are on order.

== Accidents and incidents ==
On 11 December 1998, Thai Airways International Flight 261, an Airbus A310-200 (HS-TIA, Phitsanulok), bound for Surat Thani from Bangkok, was making its third landing attempt in heavy rain when it crashed into a rice paddy about 3 km (1.9 mi) from the airport; 101 of the 146 passengers and crew aboard were killed.
