= Department of Land Transport (Thailand) =

Department of Land Transport, Ministry of Transport
- กรมการขนส่งทางบก กระทรวงคมนาคม

Agency overview
- Formed: 29 September 1972; 53 years ago
- Jurisdiction: Government of Thailand
- Headquarters: 1032, Phaholyothin Rd, Chatuchak, Bangkok 10900
- Agency executive: Chirute Visalachitra, Director General
- Parent agency: Ministry of Transport
- Website: www.dlt.go.th

Department of Land Transport (Thai: กรมการขนส่งทางบก, pronounced [krom˧.kaːn˧ kʰon˩˩˦.soŋ˨˩.tʰaːŋ˧.bok̚˨˩]) is a government department under the jurisdiction of the Ministry of Transport (Thailand). It oversees the road transport in Thailand, both public and private and has the power to prosecute those who violated the road-related laws. The department also issues the driving licences, transport licences and other documents related to road transport. It has branches in all provinces across Thailand.

The emblem of the Department of Land Transport features curved road and rising sun, all under the Rama driving his chariot.

== History ==
The Department of Land Transport originated in 1933 when the Department of Transport was established. At that time, the Department of Transport was part of the Ministry of Economy. Aside from the Department of Transport, there were three other transport-related department, namely:

1. Department of Marine Transport;
2. Department of Post and Telegraph Affairs (now National Broadcasting and Telecommunications Commission);
3. Department of Railway (now Department of Rail Transport).

The Department of Transport also oversaw and administered air transport and marine transport. In 1941, all transport-related departments were reorganised into the Ministry of Transport. Still, there was no specialised land transport department. All vehicles and drivers must register with the Department of Police.

In 1971, Thanom Kittikachorn, the then Prime Minister usurped power. He decided that the Department of Transport was too bulky and must be split into smaller departments. The Department of Transport was then split into three organisations, including

1. Department of Land Transport;
2. Department of Commercial Aviation (now the Civil Aviation Authority of Thailand and Department of Airports).

Today the Department of Land Transport maintains the driving licensing and driving education in Thailand, excluding military licences. Other transportation-related documents, such as transport operator licences and safety certificates, are issued by the department or private companies authorised and overseen by the department. The Department of Land Transport also promotes the road safety, both by providing driver education and enforcing the relevant laws.
