= Takeoff/go-around switch =

Aircraft feature

A takeoff/go-around switch (TO/GA or TOGA; /ˈtoʊɡə/) is a switch on the autothrottle of modern large aircraft, with two modes: takeoff (TO) and go-around (GA). The active mode is dependent on the phase of flight. Usually, on approach to land, the autopilot is set to approach mode, so pressing the TO/GA switch activates the go-around mode of the autothrottle, which sets thrust to about 90–92% N1; while pressing it again increases go-around thrust to full, 100+% N1. When takeoff is set on the autopilot, the switch activates the autothrottle's takeoff mode. On Boeing aircraft, TO/GA modes are selected by a separate button near the throttle levers; on Airbus aircraft, it is activated by advancing the thrust levers forward to the TO/GA detent.

== Usage in takeoff ==
Once an aircraft has lined up on the runway, the pilots first increase engine power to 40–60% N_{1} (low-pressure compressor RPM) on Boeing aircraft, or 50% N_{1} on Airbus aircraft. Large jet engines accelerate slowly from idle to approximately 40%, so stabilising the engines prior to applying full takeoff power prevents a large thrust asymmetry from causing directional problems if one engine accelerates more quickly than the other. This can also reduce the risk of a compressor stall.

Once the pilot monitoring confirms the engines are stable, the pilots proceed one of two ways. On Boeings, they press the TO/GA switch, causing the thrust levers to automatically advance to the appropriate power setting.

On Airbuses, they manually advance the thrust levers to the TO/GA detent while autothrust (A/THR) is active, which is usually the case during normal flight operations. If de-rated takeoff power is desired on an Airbus, the thrust levers are instead advanced to the FLX/MCT detent. In all cases, engine speeds then increase to the computed takeoff power.

Flight management computers on modern aircraft determine how much power the engines need to reach takeoff speed, factoring in runway length, wind speed, altitude, temperature, and, most importantly, aircraft weight. Older aircraft required pilots to perform these calculations manually before takeoff. The advantage of an automated system is reduced engine wear, as it uses only as much power as is actually needed to reach a safe takeoff speed.

== Usage in go-around ==
The go-around mode is used to fly a go-around from an approach.

If a pilot finds that they are unable to land safely, or deems it necessary to go around for any reason, activating this switch (usually positioned on the throttle levers) will increase the power to go-around thrust. If the switch is pressed again, the engine power will increase to full thrust. Importantly, the TO/GA switch modifies the autopilot and flight director modes, so that they do not continue to follow the previously selected lateral and vertical approach modes and it overrides the auto-throttle mode that was previously controlling the aircraft speed on the approach.

On Airbus aircraft, it does not disengage the autopilot but causes it to stop following the ILS and to perform the go-around maneuver automatically. In an emergency situation, using a TO/GA switch is often the quickest way of increasing thrust to abort a landing.

On some aircraft, the TO/GA switch commands the autopilot to fly a missed approach pattern, if the autopilot is programmed to do so.

== See also ==
- Index of aviation articles
- China Airlines Flight 140, crash caused by inadvertent activation of the TO/GA switch on landing
- One-Two-GO Airlines Flight 269, crash caused by a failure to activate the TO/GA switch on an attempt to go around
- Atlas Air Flight 3591, crash caused by inadvertent activation of the TO/GA switch on initial approach and improper pilot response
- Emirates Flight 521, crash due to TO/GA switch being inhibited due to pilot error
