= Emirates Flight 521 =

2016 aviation accident in the United Arab Emirates

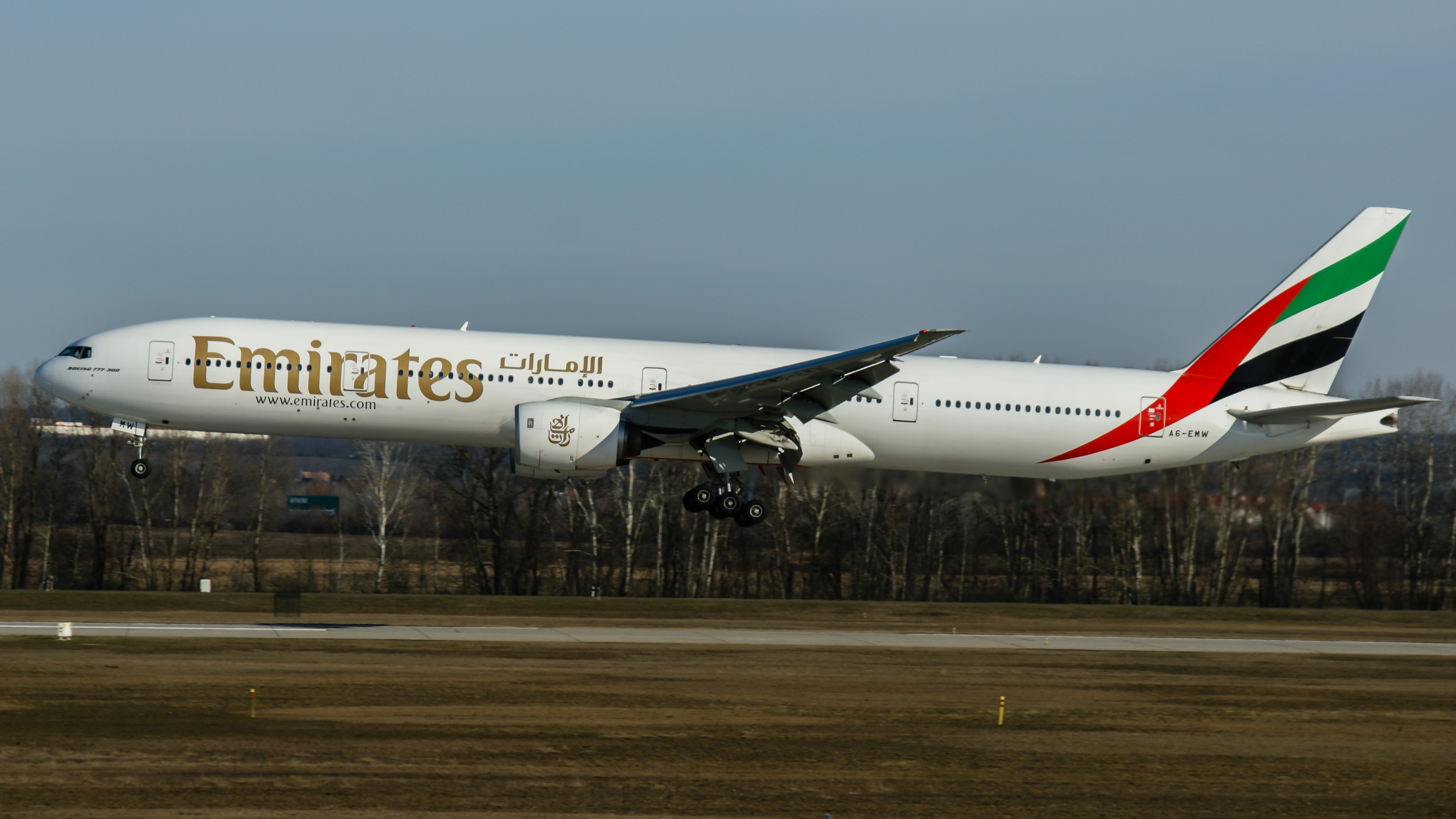
- A6-EMW, the aircraft involved in the accident, pictured in January 2016

Accident
- Date: 3 August 2016
- Summary: Crashed on runway during a failed go-around
- Site: Dubai International Airport, Dubai, United Arab Emirates; 25°14′51″N 55°22′46″E
- Total fatalities: 1
- Total injuries: 39

Aircraft
- Aircraft type: Boeing 777-31H
- Operator: Emirates
- IATA flight No.: EK521
- ICAO flight No.: UAE521
- Call sign: EMIRATES 521
- Registration: A6-EMW
- Flight origin: Thiruvananthapuram International Airport, Thiruvananthapuram, India
- Destination: Dubai International Airport, Dubai, United Arab Emirates
- Occupants: 300
- Passengers: 282
- Crew: 18
- Fatalities: 0
- Injuries: 32
- Survivors: 300

Ground casualties
- Ground fatalities: 1
- Ground injuries: 7

Emirates Flight 521 was a scheduled international passenger flight from Thiruvananthapuram, India, to Dubai, United Arab Emirates, operated by Emirates using a Boeing 777. On 3 August 2016, the aircraft, carrying 282 passengers and 18 crew, crashed while landing at Dubai International Airport.

All 300 people on board survived the accident; 32 occupants were injured and 4 occupants were seriously injured. An airport firefighter died during the rescue operation; another seven firefighters were injured. The accident is the first hull loss involving an Emirates aircraft.

== Background ==
=== Aircraft ===
The aircraft involved was a Boeing 777-31H, (Note: The aircraft was a Boeing 777-300. Boeing assigned a unique code for each company that buys one of its aircraft, which is applied as a suffix to the model number at the time the aircraft is built, hence "777-31H".) registered as A6-EMW with serial number 32700, and line number 434. It was powered by two Rolls-Royce Trent 892 engines and was 13 years old, first flying on 7 March 2003. It was delivered new to Emirates on 28 March 2003, and had logged 58,169 flight hours in 13,620 takeoff and landing cycles before the accident.

=== Crew ===
The captain was a 34-year-old UAE national who had been with Emirates since March 2001 and had logged 7,457 flight hours, including 5,123 hours on the Boeing 777. The first officer was a 37-year-old Australian national named Jeremy Webb, who had been with Emirates since October 2014 and had 7,957 flight hours, with 1,292 of them on the Boeing 777.

== Flight ==
On 3 August 2016, Flight EK521 took off from Trivandrum International Airport (TRV) at 10:34 IST (05:04 UTC), 29 minutes after its scheduled departure time. It was scheduled to land at Dubai International Airport (DXB) at 12:24 GST (08:24 UTC).

The approach and landing were normal from the air traffic control (ATC) point of view, with no emergency declared, according to ATC recordings at the time. The crew reported that they were going around, after which the tower instructed them to climb to 4,000 feet (1,200 m), which was acknowledged by the crew. Shortly after, the tower instructed the next flight to go around and alerted emergency services. Wind shear and an ambient temperature of 48 °C (118 °F) were reported.

The accident occurred at 12:37 GST (08:37 UTC). Significant wind shear affected the aircraft's airspeed through late final approach, and the aircraft touched down onto the 4,351-metre-long (14,275 ft) runway 12L at a point about 1,100 metres (3,600 ft) beyond the threshold, at a speed of 162 knots (300 km/h; 186 mph). Two seconds later, the cockpit RAAS issued a "LONG LANDING" (Note: The Runway Awareness Advisory System's "LONG LANDING" monitor warning indicates when an aircraft has not touched down within a preconfigured distance from the runway threshold, which may result in the remaining runway length being insufficient to bring the aircraft to a complete stop.) warning and the crew initiated a go-around. Six seconds after main-wheel touchdown, and with the nose-wheel still off the runway, the aircraft became airborne again after rotating to climb attitude. The flap setting was reduced to 20°, and the undercarriage was selected to retract, but the engine throttle remained unchanged because activation of go-around automation is inhibited after touchdown. The aircraft attained a maximum height above the runway of 85 feet (26 m) with its indicated airspeed decreasing, before commencing to settle back towards the ground. Twelve seconds after becoming airborne, the crew manually advanced the throttles to maximum, but the aircraft continued to sink, and it impacted the runway with its undercarriage in a partially retracted state 3 seconds later.

The aircraft first impacted with the underside of its rear fuselage and skidded about 800 metres (2,600 ft; 870 yd) along runway 12L with its landing gear partly retracted as it turned to the right about 120°. As the aircraft skidded down the runway, the number-2 (starboard or right) engine detached and slid along the wing's leading edge toward the wingtip. Firefighting appliances were at the aircraft less than 90 seconds after it came to rest (which was 33 seconds after the initial impact) and started to fight fires at several locations, as all 300 passengers and crew were safely evacuated. Videos from inside the aircraft, taken on passengers' cellphone cameras, showed the passengers failing to evacuate, instead giving priority to carry-on luggage, resulting in an overly long evacuation and heavy criticism. Nine minutes after the aircraft came to a stop, with only the aircraft captain and the senior flight attendant still on board (checking for any remaining passengers), an explosion occurred as flames reached the aircraft's center fuel tank. The explosion resulted in the death of a firefighter, a Ras al-Khaimah resident named Jassim al-Balooshi. Thirty-two of the aircraft's occupants were injured, including the captain and the senior flight attendant, who evacuated after the explosion; the senior flight attendant was the only person among the passengers and crew seriously injured, suffering from smoke inhalation. In addition, seven firefighters were injured, several of them suffering from heat stroke. The explosion spread the fire to the aircraft's cabin; firefighters needed 16 hours to bring the fire under control. The airport was closed during and following the accident, which resulted in many diverted flights.

== Passengers ==
The aircraft carried 282 passengers and 18 crew members.

People on board by nationality
Nation	Number
Australia	2
Bosnia and Herzegovina	1
Brazil	2
Croatia	1
Egypt	1
Germany	2
India	226
Lebanon	1
Malaysia	2
Philippines	1
Ireland	4
Saudi Arabia	6
South Africa	1
Switzerland	1
Thailand	2
Tunisia	1
Turkey	5
United Arab Emirates	11
United Kingdom	24
United States	6
Total (20 Nationalities)	300

== Investigation ==
The General Civil Aviation Authority (GCAA) carried out an investigation into the accident, assisted by Emirates; the aircraft's manufacturer Boeing; and Rolls-Royce, the manufacturer of the 777's engines. In addition, the United States National Transportation Safety Board (NTSB) sent a five-person team to join the other investigators. The flight data recorder and cockpit voice recorder were removed from the aircraft the day after the accident. A preliminary report into the accident was published in September 2016, and an interim statement in August 2017. A preliminary report found that the pilot attempted to take off again after briefly touching down, and that the plane ultimately hit the runway as its landing gear was still retracting.

The final report was released on 6 February 2020. In the report, the following was noted in the causes section:

The flight crew did not effectively scan and monitor the primary flight instrumentation parameters during the landing and the attempted go-around. The flight crew were unaware that the autothrottle (A/T) had not responded to move the engine thrust levers to the takeoff/go-around switch (TO/GA) position after the commander pushed the TO/GA switch at the initiation of the FCOM ̶ go-around and missed approach procedure.

The report concluded by saying:

The flight crew reliance on automation and lack of training in flying go-arounds from close to the runway significantly affected the flight crew performance in a critical flight situation which was different to that experienced by them during their simulated training flights.

== Aftermath ==
Following the accident, the airport was closed for 5 1/2 hours; many flights were diverted to nearby airports such as Abu Dhabi International, Sharjah International, and Al Maktoum International. The closure led Emirates and Flydubai to cancel several of their flights, and also affected 23,000 passengers at the airport. Dubai International Airport resumed operations at 18:30 local time, at restricted capacity, using only one runway and maximizing the use of the runways at Al Maktoum International Airport. Arriving aircraft were prioritized over departure flights. The damaged runway was repaired and reopened at 17:45 local time on 4 August, and the airport resumed normal operations on 6 August, 72 hours after the accident.

On 11 August, eight days after the crash, Emirates provided US$7,000 in compensation for each of the 282 passengers comprising $2,000 for loss of luggage and personal effects and $5,000 for any other damages each had suffered.

== See also ==
- China Airlines Flight 140 – An Airbus A300B4-622R that stalled and crashed during a go-around due to pilot error. Out of the 271 occupants on board, only 7 made it out alive.
- China Airlines Flight 676 – Another Airbus A300B4-622R that also stalled and crashed during a go-around due to pilot error. All 196 people on board died.
- East Coast Jets Flight 81 – A Hawker 800 that crashed during a go-around due to pilot error and fatigue. All eight occupants on board died.
- Flydubai Flight 981 – A Boeing 737-8KN that crashed during a go-around due to pilot error caused by loss of situational awareness. All 62 occupants on board died.
- Armavia Flight 967 – An Airbus A320-211 that crashed during a go-around due to pilot error aggravated by psycho-emotional stress. All 113 occupants on board died.
- Aeroflot Flight 521 – An IL-86 accident with the same flight number, belly landed at the same airport where Flight 521 crashed 15 years earlier, all 322 on board survived
