= Department of Civil Aviation (Thailand) =

The Department of Civil Aviation (DCA; Thai: กรมการบินพลเรือน) was a government department of Thailand from 2009 to 2015. Founded in 1933 as a bureau under the Ministry of Commerce's Department of Transport, it was elevated to department status under the new Ministry of Transport in 1963, and was originally called the Department of Commercial Aviation. It was renamed the Department of Air Transport in 2002, before becoming the Department of Civil Aviation in 2009. The department's responsibilities included prescribing, regulating, and auditing Thai civil aviation, as well as the management of Thailand's government-owned civil airports (not including the main international airports operated by the state enterprise Airports of Thailand PCL).

In October 2015, as part of restructuring in response to the ICAO's downgrading of Thailand's aviation safety rating, the DCA was split into two separate entities, the Civil Aviation Authority of Thailand (CAAT), which will conduct aviation regulatory oversight, and the Department of Airports, which will operate airports previously operated by the DCA.

== 2015 ICAO safety downgrade ==
In March 2015, the International Civil Aviation Organization's (ICAO) rejected a safety plan put forward by the DCA, which was submitted to ward off an imminent aviation safety downgrade. In January 2015, ICAO had carried out an audit and found serious gaps in safety standards at some Thai budget airlines. "The audit found that the Department of Civil Aviation had overlooked many regulations for the low-cost airlines," said one source. "Simple things like having airline manuals at ground offices, making sure you have two planes ready to relieve mechanical errors were all lacking". The ICAO said it would formally downgrade Thailand's safety ranking in early-June 2015 if the DCA were unable to fix the deficiencies by then. If safety is downgraded, all airlines registered in Thailand, including major carriers like Thai Airways would face possible bans on new routes. Existing routes would continue as normal. Japan and South Korea have already responded to the possible downgrade by banning requests for future flight plans and banning all charter flights from Thailand-registered companies. A source within Thai Airways criticized the Department of Civil Aviation, "Their lack of attention to detail is costing us all,..."

On 2 April 2015, a Thai civil aviation delegation journeyed to Seoul to attempt to deflect Korean sanctions. They failed to convince the Koreans. Three Thai charter carriers will not be permitted to fly to Korea in April. About 10,000 passengers will be affected. Japan had earlier granted Thailand a reprieve on sanctions, in effect allowing Thai charter carriers to continue to fly to Japan over the heavy 11 April–31 May travel season.

The ICAO assesses, among other things, personnel licensing and training, airworthiness assessment and certification, accident investigation, and airline operations oversight. The DCA is responsible for granting operating licenses to airlines operating in Thailand. Among the ICAO's concerns is that the DCA has issued operating licences to 22 airlines in just nine months. To date (March 2015), the DCA has issued operating licences to 70 scheduled and charter airlines. Sixty-one are still operational. Of these, 41 of are charter flight operators.

The prime minister, Gen Prayut, blamed the issue on understaffing, noting that the DCA has only 13 aviation safety inspectors. The DCA employs 1,514.

On 20 April 2015, Transport Minister Air Chief Marshal Prajin Juntong announced that Thailand would be unable to meet the ICAO's June deadline. "It is taking longer than we expected," ACM Prajin told reporters. "Our effort may be completed as late as mid-July 2015." Prime Minister Gen Prayut Chan-o-cha had said earlier that he would invoke emergency powers to "swiftly solve" Thai safety shortcomings. ICAO requirements, at minimum, will necessitate the writing and publication of an aviation safety manual by mid-year and, once that is done, the recertification of 41 airlines—28 foreign and 13 Thai—operating in Thailand.

In May 2015, the DCA announced that it will ask the US Federation Aviation Administration (FAA) to postpone its July 2015 inspection of Thai civil aviation operations until Thailand has tackled all the major safety concerns raised by the International Civil Aviation Organisation (ICAO).
