= China Airlines Flight 2265 =

1986 aviation accident

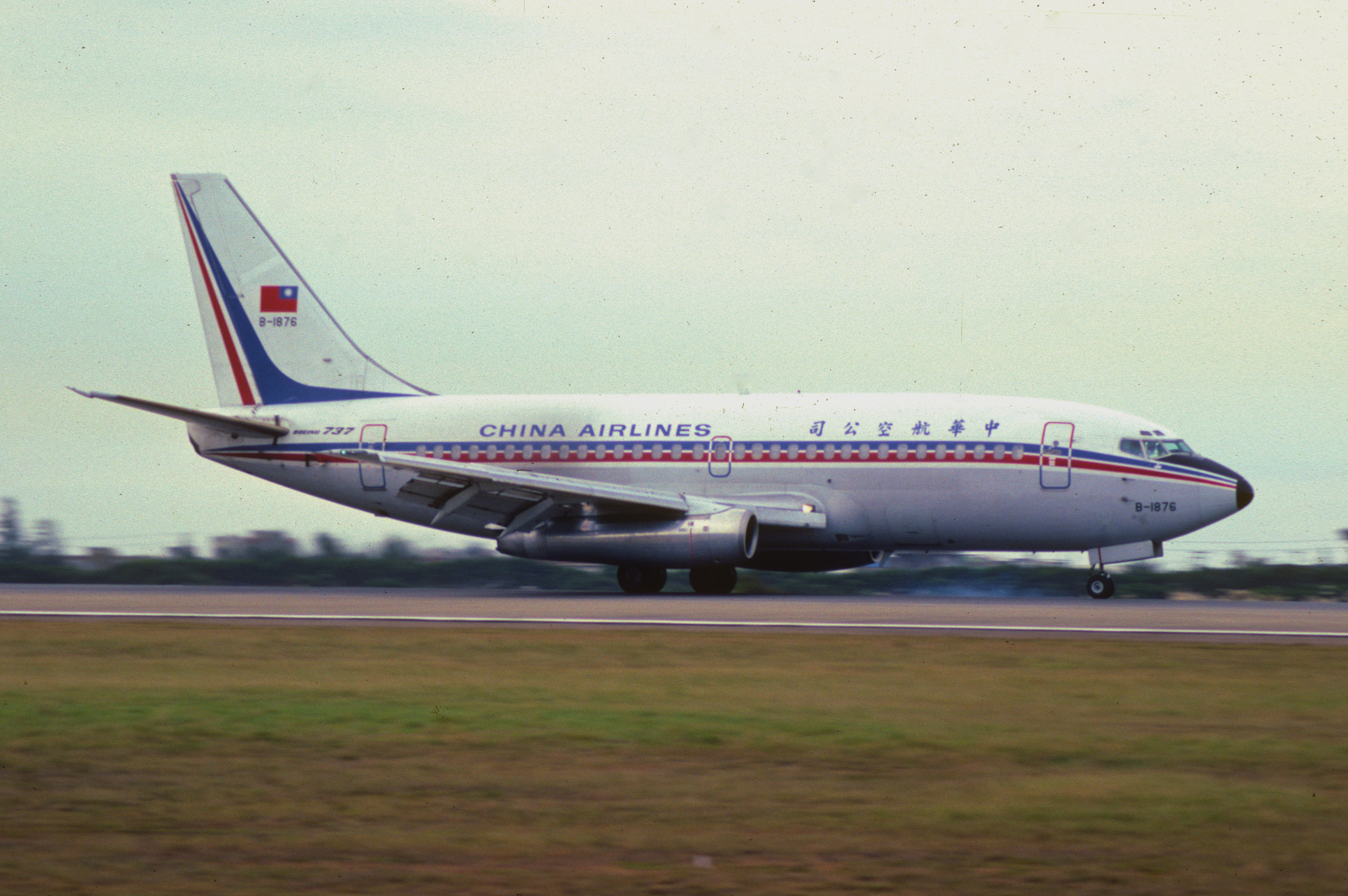
- A China Airlines Boeing 737, similar to the aircraft involved in the accident

Accident
- Date: 16 February 1986
- Summary: Controlled flight into water during go-around caused by pilot error
- Site: Pacific Ocean, 19 km (12 mi; 10 nmi) off Magong, Taiwan

Aircraft
- Aircraft type: Boeing 737-281
- Operator: China Airlines
- IATA flight No.: CI2265
- ICAO flight No.: CAL2265
- Call sign: DYNASTY 2265
- Registration: B-1870
- Flight origin: Taipei Songshan Airport, Taiwan
- Destination: Penghu Airport, Taiwan
- Occupants: 13
- Passengers: 6
- Crew: 7
- Fatalities: 13
- Survivors: 0

On 16 February 1986, a Boeing 737-200 operating a charter flight as China Airlines Flight 2265 went missing after executing a go-around after touching down at Penghu Airport, Taiwan. It was discovered several weeks later on the seabed, 19 kilometres (12 mi; 10 nmi) north of the island. All 6 passengers and 7 crew members were confirmed dead.

== Aircraft ==
The aircraft involved was a Boeing 737-281, MSN 20226, registered as B-1870, that was manufactured by Boeing Commercial Airplanes in 1969. It was equipped with two Pratt & Whitney JT8D-7 engines. The aircraft was the same one involved in the China Airlines Flight 831 hijacking on 9 March 1978.

== Sequence of events ==
The aircraft took off from Taipei on 16 February 1986 at 18:09 local time on a flight to Penghu Airport, Magong. When the aircraft touched down at 19:05, the crew felt a violent vibration at the front of the aircraft. The pilots executed a go-around. After the aircraft departed the vicinity of the airport, it crashed into the Pacific Ocean off the coast near the city of Magong. All 13 occupants were killed on impact. Searchers did not find the wreckage of the aircraft until 10 March; it was located in 190 feet (58 m) of water, 12 miles (10 nmi; 19 km) north of the island.

== See also ==
- One-Two-GO Airlines Flight 269
- Tatarstan Airlines Flight 363
- Flydubai Flight 981
