= China Airlines Flight 811 =

1980 aviation accident

China Airlines Flight 811 (1980)
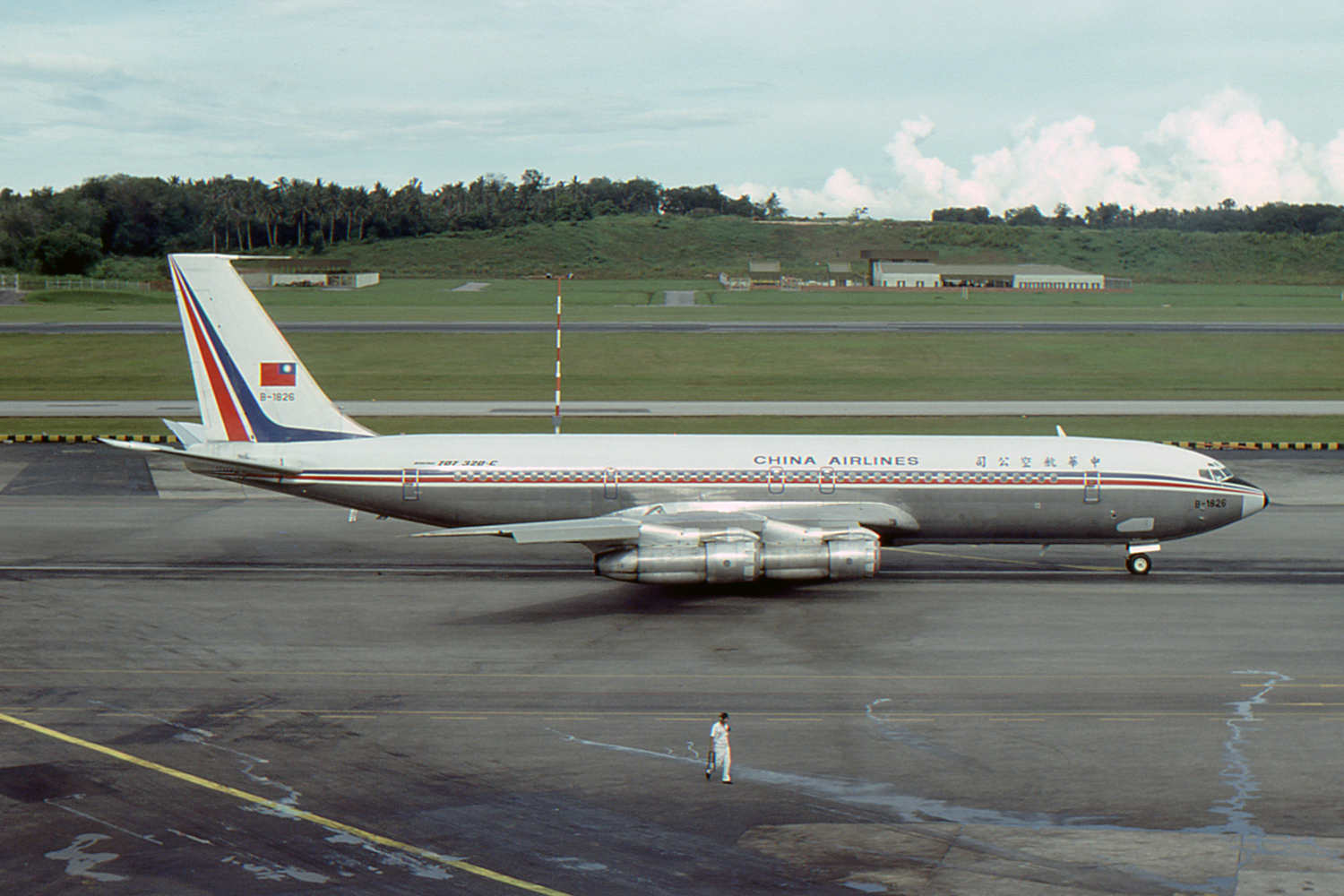
- B-1826, the aircraft involved in the accident, pictured in 1979

Occurrence
- Date: February 27, 1980
- Site: Manila International Airport

Aircraft
- Aircraft type: Boeing 707-309C
- Operator: China Airlines
- Call sign: DYNASTY 811
- Registration: B-1826
- Flight origin: Chiang Kai Shek Airport, Taiwan
- Destination: Manila International Airport, Philippines
- Passengers: 124
- Crew: 11
- Fatalities: 2
- Injuries: 51
- Survivors: 133

China Airlines Flight 811 was a Boeing 707 that crash-landed in Manila International Airport on February 27, 1980.

== Accident ==
China Airlines Flight 811 (flight number IATA: CI811, ICAO: CAL811, call sign: DYNASTY 811) was a scheduled international flight from Chiang Kai Shek Airport to Manila International Airport operated by China Airlines. On February 27, 1980, the flight was operated by a Boeing 707-309C. During landing, the aircraft landed 50 meters short of the runway threshold, causing the landing gear to break and catch fire. Of the 135 people on board, two died.

== Aircraft ==
The aircraft involved was a Boeing 707-309C built at the Boeing Field at Washington in 1969 with serial number 20262 and model serial number 830. The first flight of the machine took place on November 26, 1969, on December 11, 1969, it was delivered to China Airlines with the aircraft registration B-1826. The longhaul quadjet was equipped with four Pratt & Whitney JT3D-3B turbofan engines.

== Crew ==
Captain Wu Gong had 30 years of flight experience, while the first officer had 15 years of flight experience.
