= Civil Aviation Authority of Thailand =

Independent agency of the Thai government

- สำนักงานการบินพลเรือนแห่งประเทศไทย

Agency overview
- Formed: 3 October 2015; 10 years ago
- Jurisdiction: Government of Thailand
- Headquarters: 222 Soi Vibhavadi Rangsit 28, Vibhavadi Rangsit Rd., Chatuchak, Chatuchak, Bangkok 10900
- Agency executive: Air Chief Marshal Manat Chavanaprayoon, Director-General
- Parent agency: Ministry of Transport
- Website: www.caat.or.th

The Civil Aviation Authority of Thailand (CAAT; Thai: สำนักงานการบินพลเรือนแห่งประเทศไทย), is an independent agency of the Thai government under the oversight of the Minister of Transport. Its responsibilities includes prescribing, regulating, and auditing Thai civil aviation.

It was formed in October 2015 from the split of the Department of Civil Aviation (DCA) into two separate agencies in response to the International Civil Aviation Organization's downgrading of Thailand's aviation safety rating. The other body split from the DCA is the Department of Airports (DOA), which operates airports previously managed by the DCA.

== See also ==
- Aircraft Accident Investigation Committee
