= China Airlines Flight 831 =

1978 hijacked passenger flight

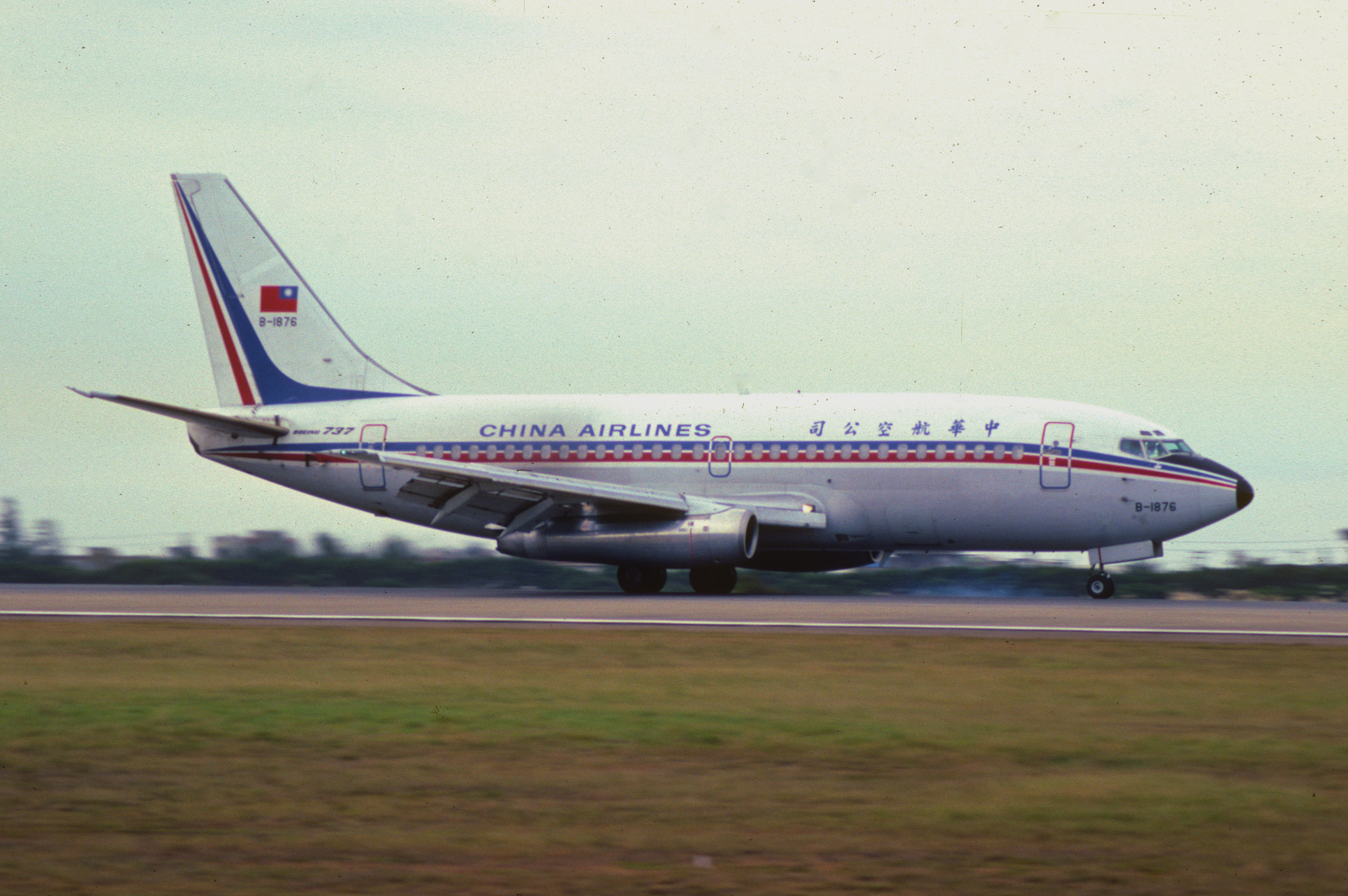
- B-1876, an aircraft similar to the one involved

Hijacking
- Date: March 9, 1978
- Summary: Aircraft hijacking
- Site: Hong Kong

Aircraft
- Aircraft type: Boeing 737-281
- Operator: China Airlines
- Call sign: DYNASTY 831
- Registration: B-1870
- Flight origin: Kaohsiung International Airport
- Destination: Kai Tak Airport
- Occupants: 101
- Passengers: 92
- Crew: 9
- Fatalities: 1 (hijacker)
- Injuries: 2
- Survivors: 100

China Airlines Flight 831 was a scheduled passenger flight from Kaohsiung in Taiwan to British Hong Kong that was hijacked on 9 March 1978.

== Aircraft ==
The aircraft involved was a Boeing 737-281, with aircraft registration B-1870, that was manufactured by Boeing Commercial Airplanes in 1969. It was equipped with two Pratt & Whitney JT8D-7 engines.

== Hijacking ==
The flight, operated by a Boeing 737-281 registered as B-1870, departed at 16:08 local time and was uneventful until 17:00, when a flight engineer, 34-year-old Shi Mingcheng, broke into the cockpit and demanded the pilots to fly to Mainland China. Captain Gao Zhixian and First Officer Gong Zhongkang (both former Republic of China Air Force pilots) refused the demands and were beaten by Shi who wielded a hammer and a pair of scissors. Despite having injuries from the beating, the pilots managed to order an on-board security guard to the cockpit. The guard broke down the cockpit door using a fire extinguisher, shot and killed the hijacker. The flight landed at Kai Tak Airport at 17:20, after which the Airport Security Unit searched the aircraft for potential accomplices and questioned passengers. The pilots were then taken to Queen Elizabeth Hospital due to their injuries.

== Aftermath ==
On 16 February 1986, the aircraft involved later crashed as Flight 2265 near Penghu Airport, killing all 13 people on board.
