= Ministry of Transport (Thailand) =

Government ministry of Thailand

- กระทรวงคมนาคม
- Seal of Rama on a chariot

- Flag of Rama on a chariot

Ministry overview
- Formed: 1 April 1912; 114 years ago
- Preceding Ministry: Ministry of Communications
- Jurisdiction: Government of Thailand
- Headquarters: Pom Prap Sattru Phai, Bangkok
- Minister responsible: Pipat Ratchakitprakarn, Minister
- Deputy Ministers responsible: Siripong Angkasakulkiat, Deputy Minister; Phattharaphong Phattharaprasit, Deputy Minister; Sanphet Boonyamanee, Deputy Minister
- Ministry executive: Chayatan Phromsorn, Permanent Secretary
- Website: MOT

The Ministry of Transport (Abrv: MOT; Thai: กระทรวงคมนาคม, RTGS: Krasuang Khamanakhom) is the ministry of the Government of Thailand responsible for the development, construction, and regulation of the nation's land, marine, and air transportation systems.

== History ==
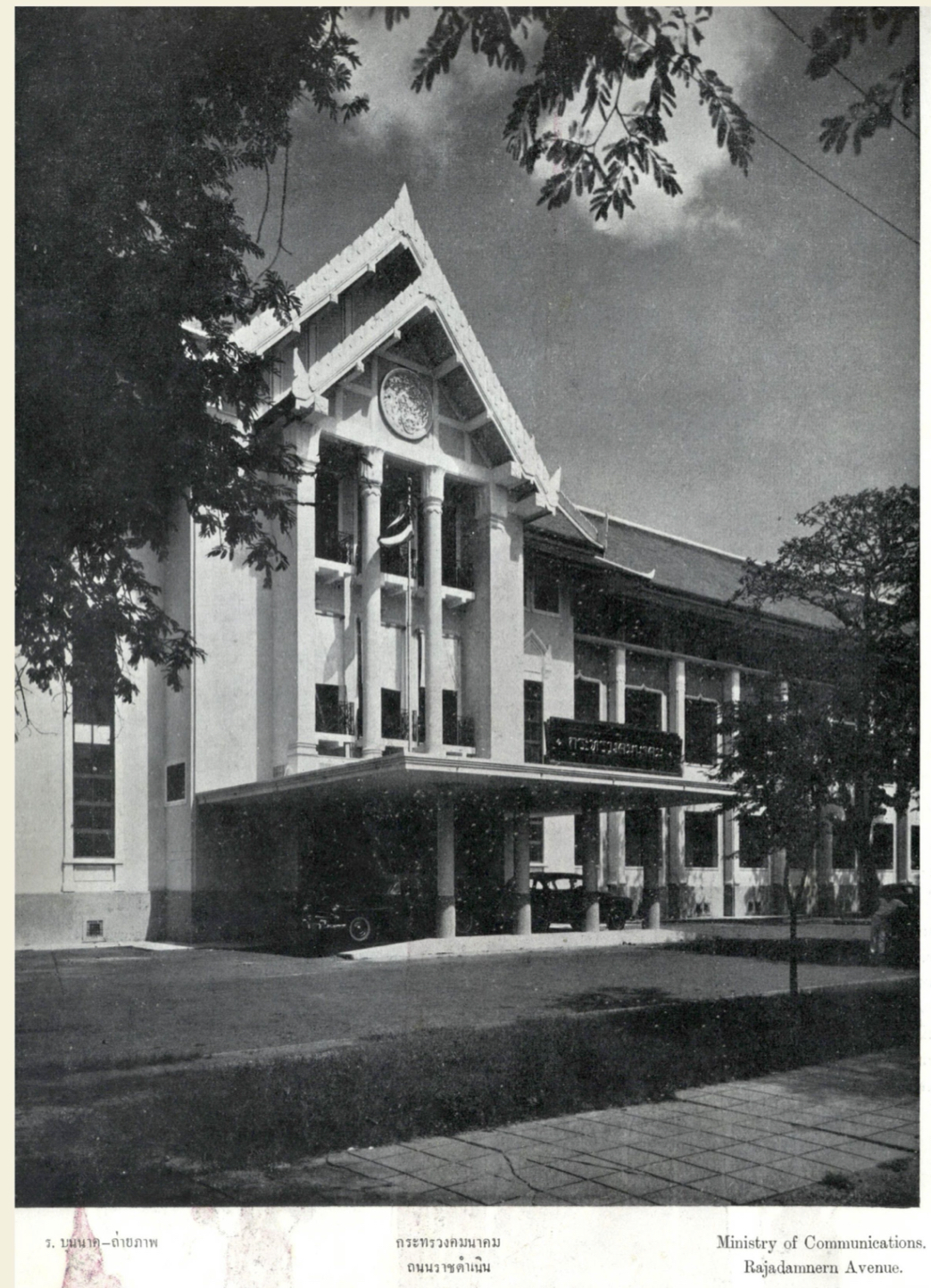
The headquarters of the ministry, image c. 1965

The Ministry of Transport was previously known as the Ministry of Communications (although the name is the same in Thai), and was founded in 1941. Its English name was changed to the Ministry of Transport in 2002, when the Reorganisation of Ministries, Government Agencies and Departments, B.E. 2545 Act came into force. It stipulated that the Ministry of Transport (the former Ministry of Communications) would have overall responsibility for transportation, transportation-related businesses, traffic planning, and transport infrastructure development.

As of 2023, the ministry is headed by Transport Minister Suriya Juangroongruangkit.

== Organization ==
The MOT is composed of ministry departments and profit-making state enterprises.

=== Departments ===
- Office of the Minister
- Office of the Permanent Secretary
- Department of Land Transport (DLT)
- Marine Department
- Department of Airports (DOA)
- Department of Highways (DOH)
- Department of Rural Roads (DRR)
- Department of Rail Transport (DRT)
- Office of Transport and Traffic Policy and Planning (OTP)
- Civil Aviation Authority of Thailand (CAAT)

=== State enterprises ===
- The Airports of Thailand Public Company Limited (AOT)
- Port Authority of Thailand (PAT)
- State Railway of Thailand (SRT)(Official Website)
- The Transport Company Limited
- Mass Rapid Transit Authority of Thailand (MRTA)
- Expressway Authority of Thailand (EXAT)
- Bangkok Mass Transit Authority (BMTA)
- Civil Aviation Training Center (Thailand)
- Aeronautical Radio of Thailand Company Limited
- Suvarnabhumi Airport Hotel Company Limited
- THAI-AMADEUS Southeast Asia Company Limited
- Airport Rail Link Co, Limited
