= Thai Airways International =

Flag carrier airline of Thailand

Thai Airways International บริษัท การบินไทย จำกัด (มหาชน)

- A Thai Airways Boeing 777-300ER
| IATA | ICAO | Call sign |
|---|---|---|
| TG | THA | THAI |
- Founded: 29 March 1960; 66 years ago (as Thai International)
- Commenced operations: 1 April 1988; 38 years ago (merger with Thai Airways Company)
- AOC #: AOC.0003
- Hubs: Bangkok–Suvarnabhumi
- Focus cities: Chiang Mai; Phuket
- Frequent-flyer program: Royal Orchid Plus
- Alliance: Star Alliance
- Subsidiaries: THAI-Amadeus Southeast Asia; Thai Flight Training; Wingspan Services; Tour Eurng Luang; Thai MRO Group; Thai MRO Services
- Fleet size: 80
- Destinations: 65
- Parent company: Ministry of Finance (42.94%)
- Traded as: SET: THAI
- Headquarters: Chatuchak, Bangkok, Thailand
- Key people: Lavaron Sangsnit (chairman); Chai Eamsiri (CEO)
- Revenue: ▼ ฿44,409.45 million (Q3 2025)
- Net income: ▼ ฿4,421 million (Q3 2025)
- Total assets: ▲ ฿299,730.41 million (Q3 2025)
- Employees: 12,858 (2025)
- Website: www.thaiairways.com

Thai Airways International plc is the flag carrier of Thailand. Formed in 1961 as a joint venture between SAS and Thai Airways Company, the airline has its corporate headquarters in Vibhavadi Rangsit Road, Chatuchak district, Bangkok, and primarily operates from Suvarnabhumi Airport. THAI is a founding member of the Star Alliance. The airline is the second-largest shareholder of the low-cost carrier Nok Air with an 8.91 percent stake (2021), and it launched a regional carrier under the name Thai Smile in the middle of 2012 using new Airbus A320 aircraft. In 2023, it was announced that Thai Smile would be merged back into Thai Airways.

Operating from its primary hub at Bangkok's Suvarnabhumi Airport, Thai currently serves 51 international and 9 domestic destinations using a fleet of 80 aircraft consisting of wide-body and narrow-body aircraft from both Boeing and Airbus with 80 aircraft on order as of January 2026, with plans to increase its fleet to 143 aircraft by 2029. Currently Thai's route network is dominated by flights to cities in Europe, Asia and Oceania flying to 29 countries as of January 2026 including 9 domestic routes.

Thai Airways is a member and one of the five founding members of Star Alliance, which was founded on 14 May 1997.

== History ==
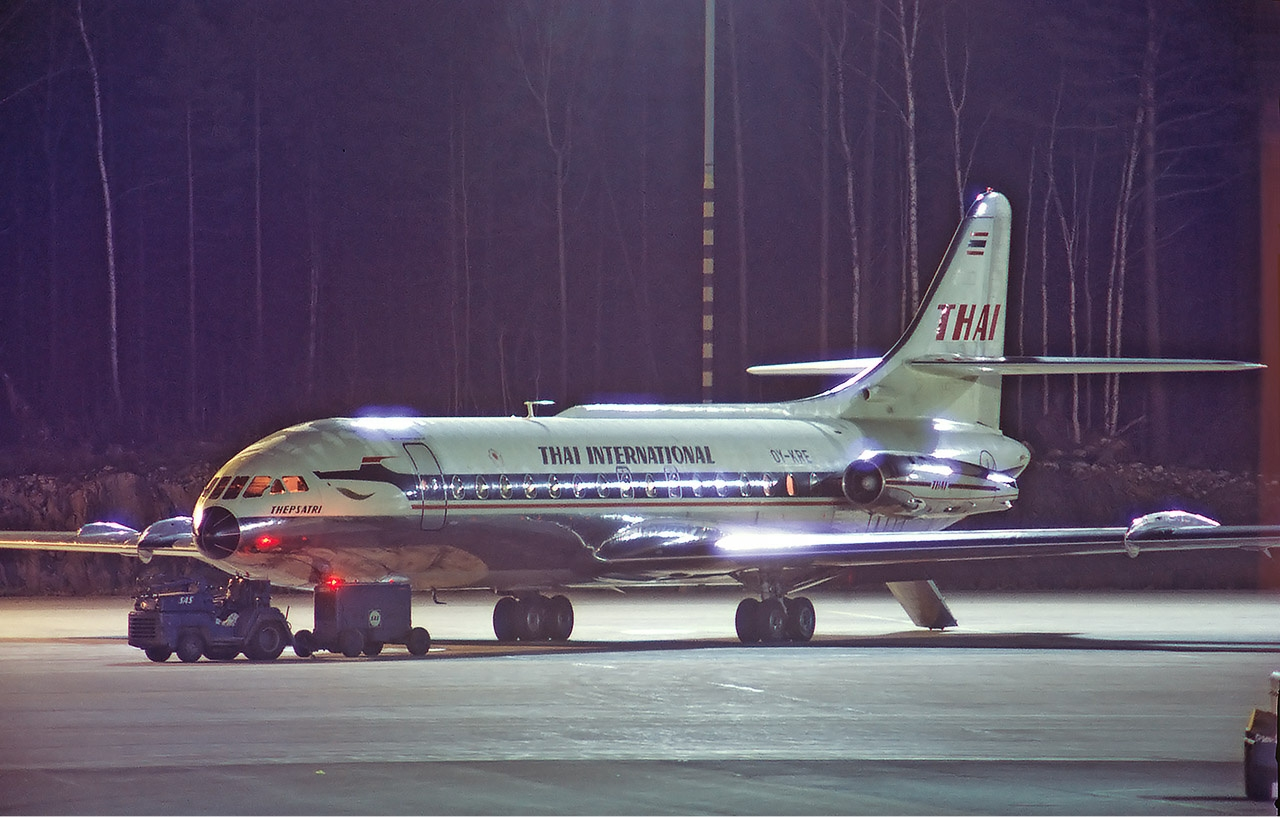
A Thai Airways International Sud Aviation Caravelle at Stockholm in 1970

=== Beginnings ===
Thai Airways International was founded in 1960 as a joint venture between Scandinavian Airlines System (SAS), which held a 30 percent share of the new company valued at two million Thai baht, and Thailand's domestic carrier, Thai Airways Company (Thai: เดินอากาศไทย). SAS provided operational, managerial, and marketing expertise, with training aimed at building a fully independent national airline in the shortest possible time. Thai nationals were gradually able to assume full managerial responsibility and the number of expatriate staff duly decreased, with expatriates accounting for less than one percent of staff based in Thailand in 1987.

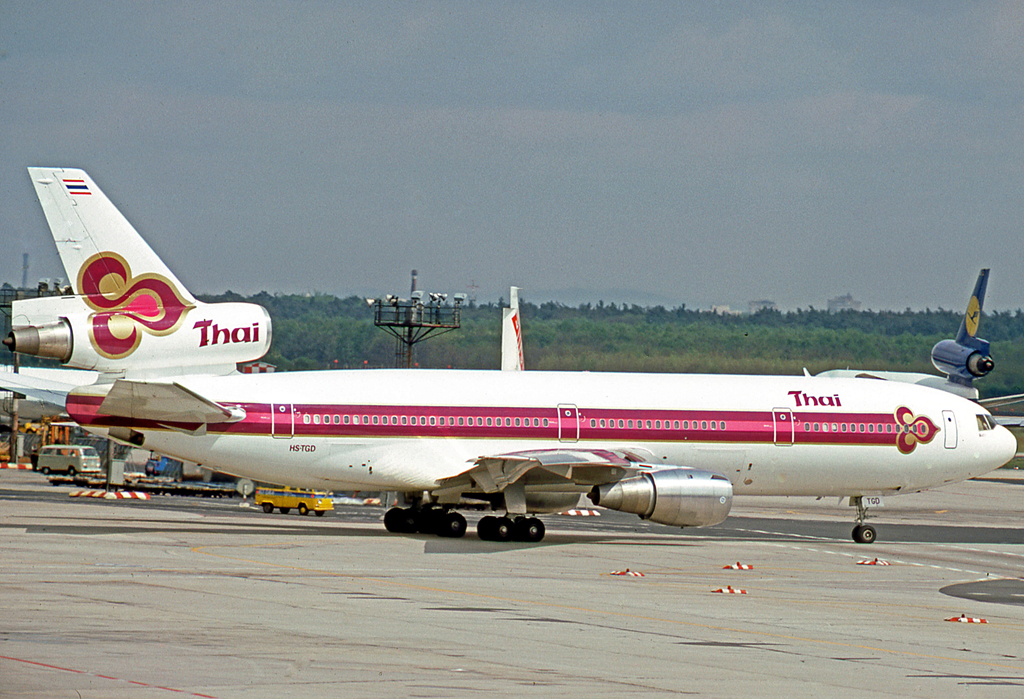
A Thai McDonnell Douglas DC-10 at Frankfurt in 1977

The airline's first intercontinental services using Douglas DC-8s started in 1971 to Australia, and then to Europe the following year. A number of the larger Douglas DC-10 wide-body tri-jets was acquired in the late-1970s. Services to North America commenced in 1980.

On 1 April 1977, after 17 years of capital participation by SAS, the Thai government bought out the remaining 15 percent of SAS-owned shares and Thai became a state owned enterprise of the Thai government. As of 22 May 2020, the Thai Ministry of Finance is no longer the majority shareholder, having reduced its holding to 47.86 percent from 51.03 percent.

In 1979, the carrier received its first cargo aircraft which is a Douglas DC-8-62AF used for flying between Bangkok and Karachi, Frankfurt, Copenhagen, Hong Kong as well as a flight from Copenhagen to Paris.

=== 1980s and 1990s: merger with Thai Airways Company ===
On 6 December 1987, services to Auckland in New Zealand were inaugurated. On 1 April 1988, then-Prime Minister Gen. Prem Tinsulanonda, merged the international and domestic operations of the two companies to form the present company, Thai Airways International, to have a single national carrier. On 25 June 1991, the reconfigured company listed its shares on the Stock Exchange of Thailand and offered them to the public. The Thai public offering of shares is the largest ever undertaken in the country.

In 1997, Thai Airways planned a privatization program, the first in Thai history.

On 14 May 1997, Thai Airways, along with Lufthansa, Air Canada, SAS, and United Airlines, founded the world's first and largest airline alliance, Star Alliance.

The genesis of Thai's later financial difficulties has been attributed to actions taken in the 1990s when Thai Airways began "buying every type of plane that was being manufactured." Different models meant that the airline had to train an army of technicians to keep differing airframes and engines from both General Electric and Rolls-Royce airworthy, significantly inflating maintenance costs.

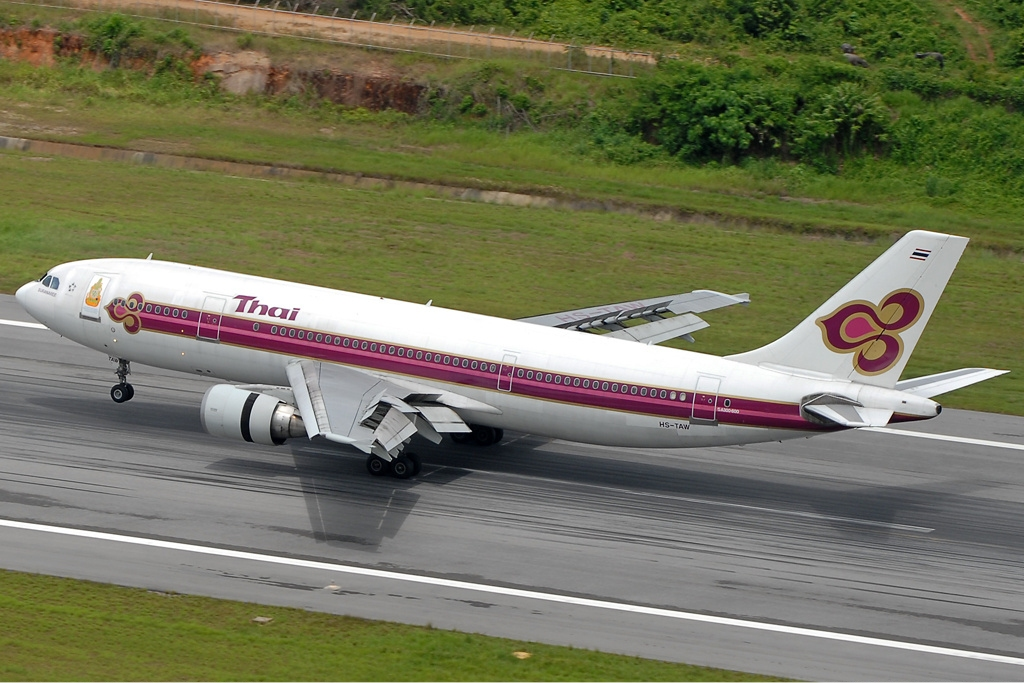
Thai Airbus A300 at Phuket International Airport in 2008

=== 2000s: Airline brand renewal and financial difficulties ===
In the first decade of the 21st century, Thai Airways continued its route network expansion with new services to Chengdu, Busan, Chennai, Xiamen, Milan, Moscow, Islamabad, Hyderabad, Johannesburg, and Oslo.

Using the Airbus A340-500 fleet, which was acquired in 2005, Thai commenced non-stop flights between Bangkok and New York and Bangkok to Los Angeles, its first non-stop service to North America. The airline later converted an existing one-stop service (via Tokyo) to Los Angeles into a non-stop flight using the same aircraft type. Citing very high fuel costs, Thai discontinued the New York service in July 2008. The service to Los Angeles was again reverted to one-stop service via Seoul on 1 May 2012, leaving the airline without a non-stop service between Thailand and North America. The A340s used were phased out, replaced by the Boeing 777-200ER for the Bangkok–Seoul–Los-Angeles route.

The 2000s also saw Thai expand its Thai airport network beyond its Bangkok hub. The airline launched non-stop flights from Phuket to Tokyo, Seoul, and Hong Kong.

During the late-2000s, Thai's growth was hampered by a combination of internal and external factors, including a spike in fuel prices, domestic political conflict in Thailand, and the global economic crisis of the late-2000s. In 2008, after achieving profitability for the previous 40 years, Thai recorded a loss for the first time in its history of around 21 billion baht (US$675 million). The airline blamed high fuel costs and Thailand's political turmoil. As of Q2 2009, after a series of restructuring initiatives, including a two-year deferral of its Airbus A380 deliveries, the carrier returned to a net profit of 2.5 billion baht.

Thai's need for reform became evident in the first decade of the 21st century, but reforms, when they came, were invariably cut short. Thai's problems were threefold: ineffective leadership at the top; inexperienced boards; and a coddled union. Piyasvasti Amranand took Thai's helm in October 2009 after serving as energy minister. At Thai, he is still regarded as a true reformer, imposing salary cuts for senior executives as part of his drive to reduce costs. He was voted out by the board in 2012 for what may have been political reasons. The board of directors was, after the 2014 Thai coup d'état, packed with military brass. Five civilian members were purged and replaced with five Royal Thai Air Force (RTAF) generals, as was the board's chairman. The appointments ended Thai's policy of only appointing technocrats to the board. Three RTAF generals remain on the 2020 board; they have no experience running listed companies or restructuring loss-making airlines. Concomitantly, employees at Thai enjoyed an overprotected status. Salary increases based on length of employment led to senior captains earning more than the CEO.

=== 2010s: Fleet renewal and route expansion ===
While celebrating its fiftieth anniversary in 2010, Thai, led by its president, Piyasvasti Amranand, drafted new plans for the airline's future, including aircraft fleet renewal and an upgrade of existing services. Thai placed orders for a number of aircraft, including the Boeing 787 and Airbus A350, and it launched a refurbishment of its Boeing 747 and 777 cabins. Mindful of rising fuel costs, the airline phased-out its most inefficient aircraft, including its Airbus A340-500s. The airline took delivery of its first Airbus A380 aircraft in the second half of 2012, intending to eventually deploy the aircraft on its core European routes.

THAI resumed network expansion with the resumption of flights to Brussels, in addition to a new non-stop flight from Stockholm and Copenhagen to Phuket. At the same time, the Greek debt crisis caused Thai to suspend its services to Athens.

Thai expects to be the first carrier in Asia to fly commercial flights using biofuels. The carrier launched the initiative with experimental flights in December 2011 as part of its Corporate Social Responsibility program, otherwise known as "Travel Green". Thai hopes to stimulate sustained biofuel production in Thailand by working with Thai government agencies and regional corporate partners, such as PTT Public Company Limited. The effort aims to reduce carbon dioxide emissions in regional air travel as well as position Thailand to be the "bio hub" of Asia.

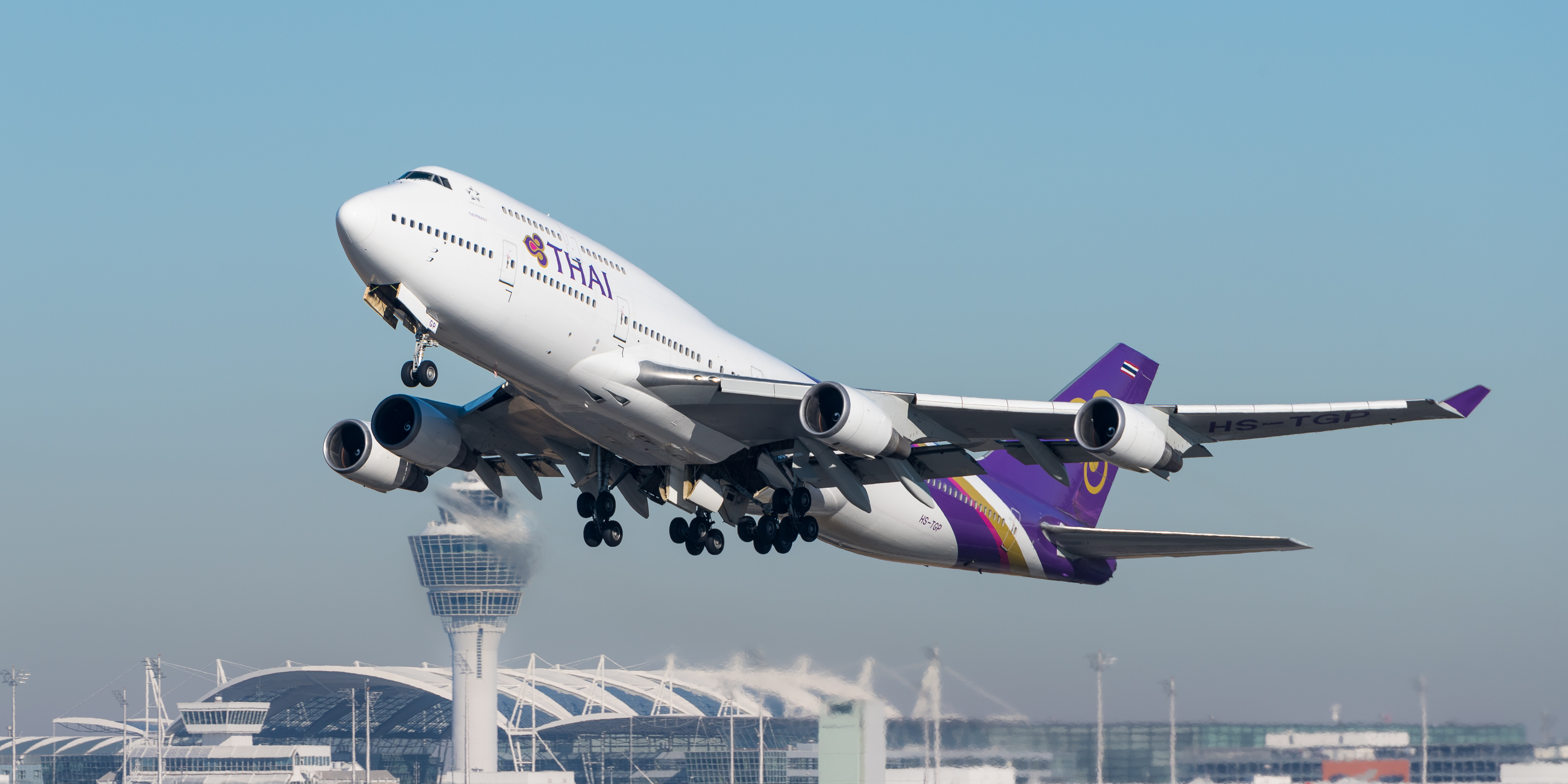
Thai Boeing 747-400 at Munich Airport in 2015

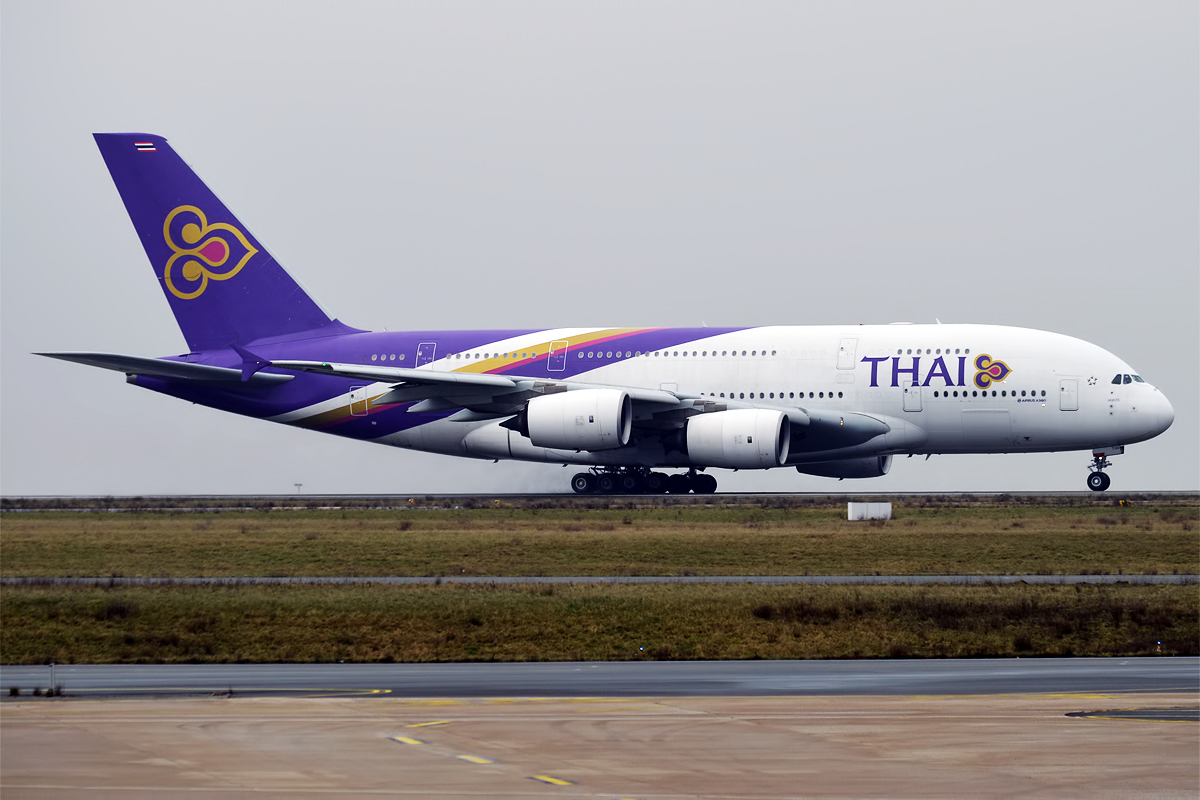
Thai Airbus A380

In April 2015, after an audit of the Thai Department of Civil Aviation, Thailand was downgraded from Category 1 to Category 2 due to negative audit results from the International Civil Aviation Organization (ICAO). On 1 December 2015, the US Federal Aviation Administration (FAA) announced their reassessment of the safety rating for Thailand, downgrading it from a Category 1 to Category 2 country. The FAA stated, "U.S. and Thai aviation officials have a long-standing cooperative relationship and both our countries work continuously to meet the challenge of ensuring aviation safety. A Category 2 International Aviation Safety Assessment (IASA) rating means that the country either lacks laws or regulations necessary to oversee air carriers in accordance with minimum international standards, or its civil aviation authority—a body equivalent to the FAA for aviation safety matters—is deficient in one or more areas, such as technical expertise, trained personnel, record-keeping, or inspection procedures. With a Category 2 rating, Thailand's air carriers can continue existing routes to the United States but they won't be allowed to establish new routes to the United States."

The European Aviation Safety Agency (EASA) declined to blacklist any Thai carriers following a review of certain carriers in November 2015. Thai later received third country operator (TCO) certification from the EU, effective 15 December 2015, authorizing the carrier to continue flying to the EU for the foreseeable future.

In July 2015, Thai announced the planned cancellation of service to Los Angeles after 25 October 2015, marking the end of US service.

In June 2016, as a result of its restructuring plan, Thai announced it would commence thrice-weekly Tehran service. However, the service ended on 28 February 2018. The airline also considered a return to the US using Boeing 787-9 by 2017. However, Charamporn Jothikastira, president of Thai, turned down the possibility of returning to Los Angeles or New York City due to losses in the past. Instead, Thai considered other cities such as San Francisco and Seattle. During this time, Thai Smile planned new regional routes to Cebu, Medan, Surabaya, Chandigarh, Shantou and Tianjin.

In August 2016, Thai introduced a new route network management system. Following implementation, flight schedules were synchronized, allowing international passengers to transit via Bangkok Suvarnabhumi more conveniently. Thai planned to adjust thirteen route schedules, mainly in Japan, Australia, and India. Routes to Perth and Brisbane were announced.

In 2019, Thai was audited by the State Audit Office as a result of a 6.8 billion baht loss in the first half of the year.

=== 2020s: Bankruptcies and rehabilitations ===
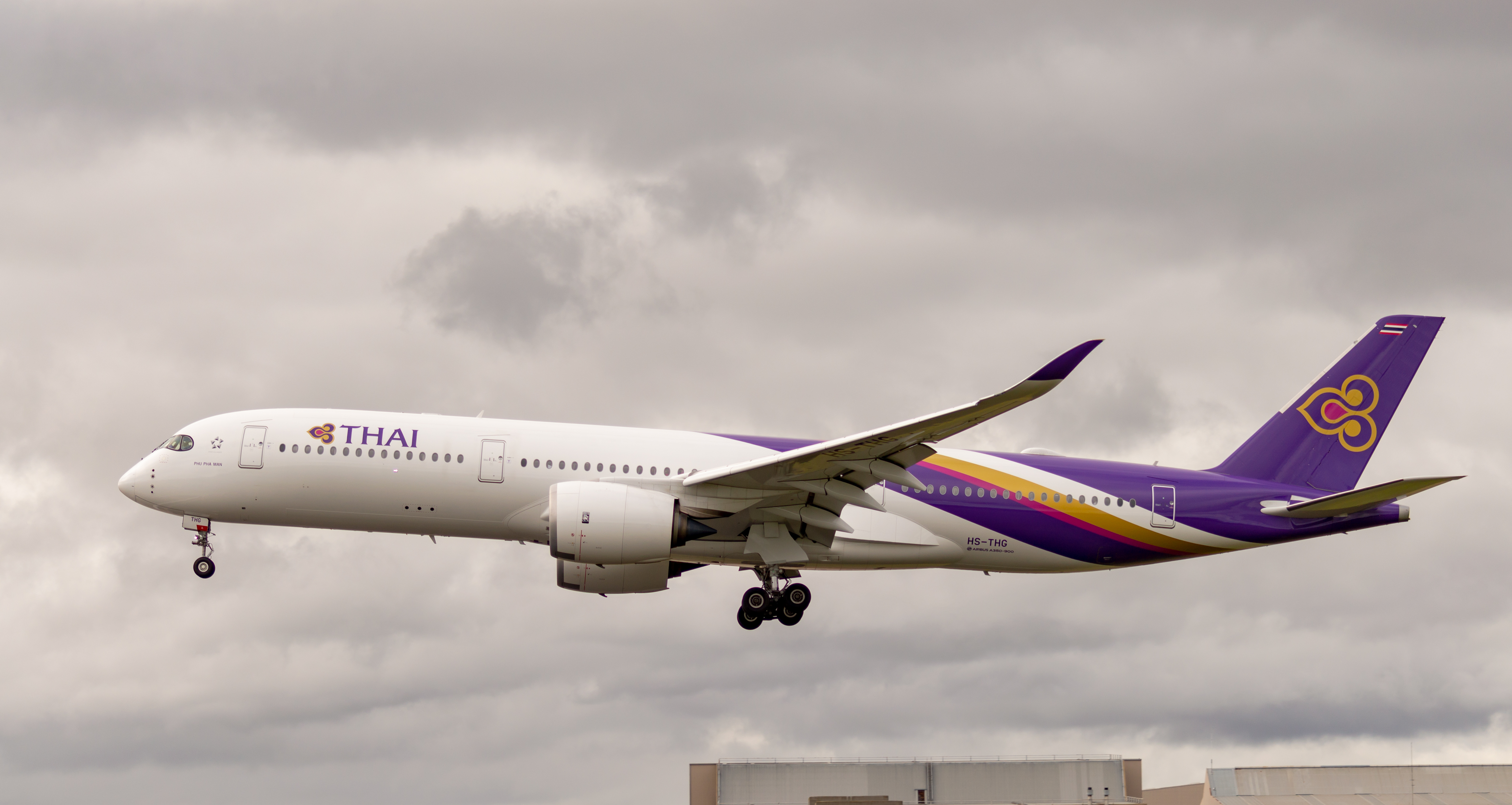
Thai Airways Airbus A350-900, 2018

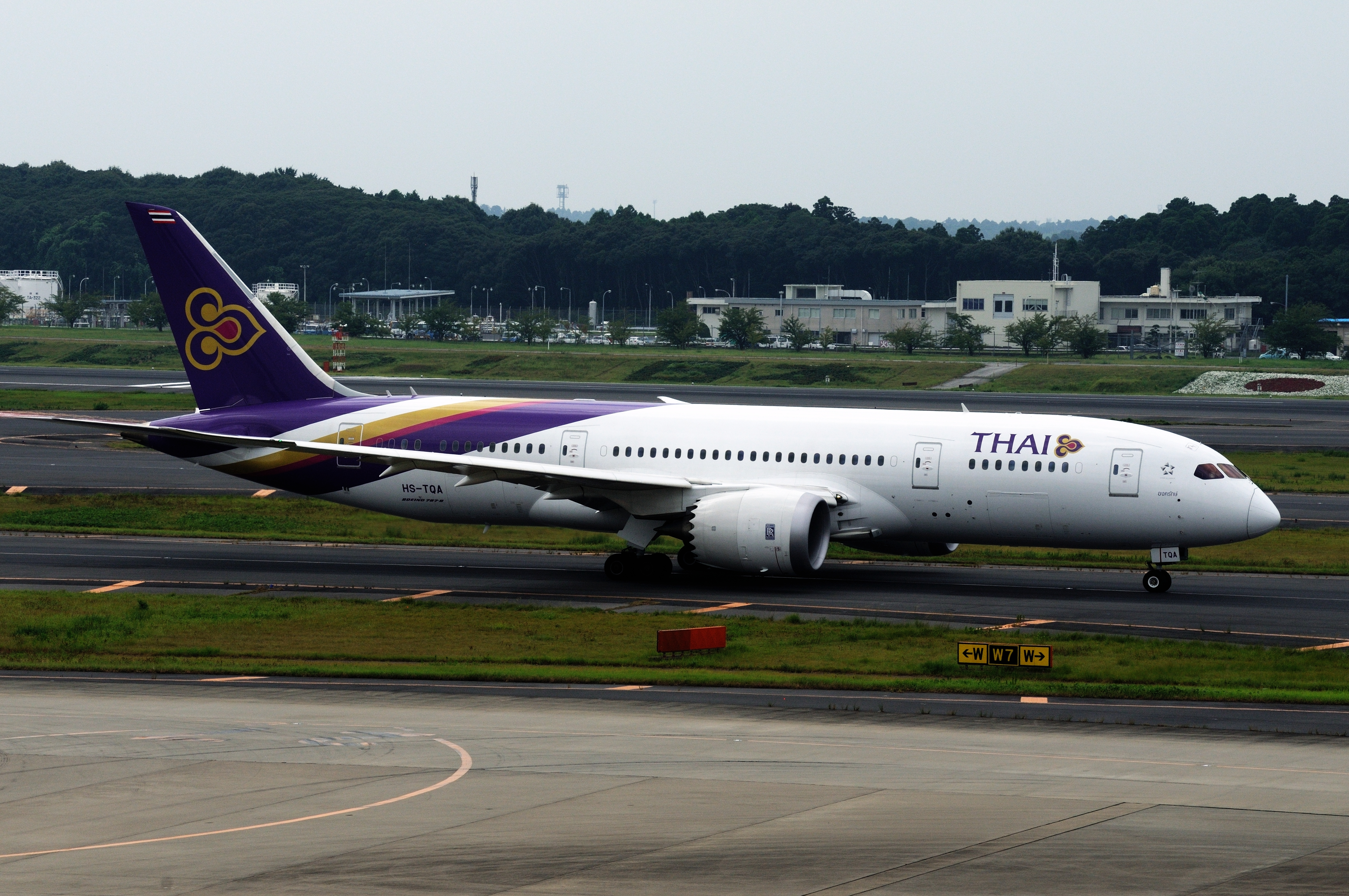
Thai Airways Boeing 787-8 at Perth Airport, 2025

On 19 May 2020, the Thai Cabinet approved Thai Airways' filing for bankruptcy protection at the Central Bankruptcy Court, after the company had struggled with a debt of ฿240 billion and heavy consecutive losses since 2017, which were further worsened by the COVID-19 pandemic that caused Thai Airways to lose at least ฿18 billion. The Thai government later sold a 3.2% stake in the company, ending the company's status as a state-owned enterprise.

On 14 September 2020, the Central Bankruptcy Court in Bangkok approved THAI’s petition to enter a court-supervised business rehabilitation, marking the largest corporate restructuring in Thai history.

In February 2023, it has been announced that subsidiary Thai Smile will be dissolved as a separate entity and merged into Thai Airways by 2024 in an effort to reduce losses. The last flight of Thai Smile occurred on December 31, 2023.

In November 2024, regulators announced that Thailand is expected to regain its Category 1 (CAT 1) safety rating in early 2025, which would allow Thai Airways and other carriers to operate flights between Thailand and the United States. On 21 November 2024, it was reported that Thai Airways will resume its flight to Brussels, Belgium beginning 1 December 2024 after a 4-year hiatus due to the COVID-19 pandemic.

On 2 May 2025, Mr. Piyasawat Amaranan, Chairman of the Board of Directors of the Business Rehabilitation Plan for Thai Airways Public Company Limited, revealed that Thai Airways is conducting a feasibility study to resume flights to the United States via Osaka. However, according to the airline's 10-year plan, there will be no flights to the United States due to a shortage of aircraft, as Thai Airways is prioritising increasing flight frequency on high-potential routes such as Paris and resuming services to Vienna and Amsterdam.

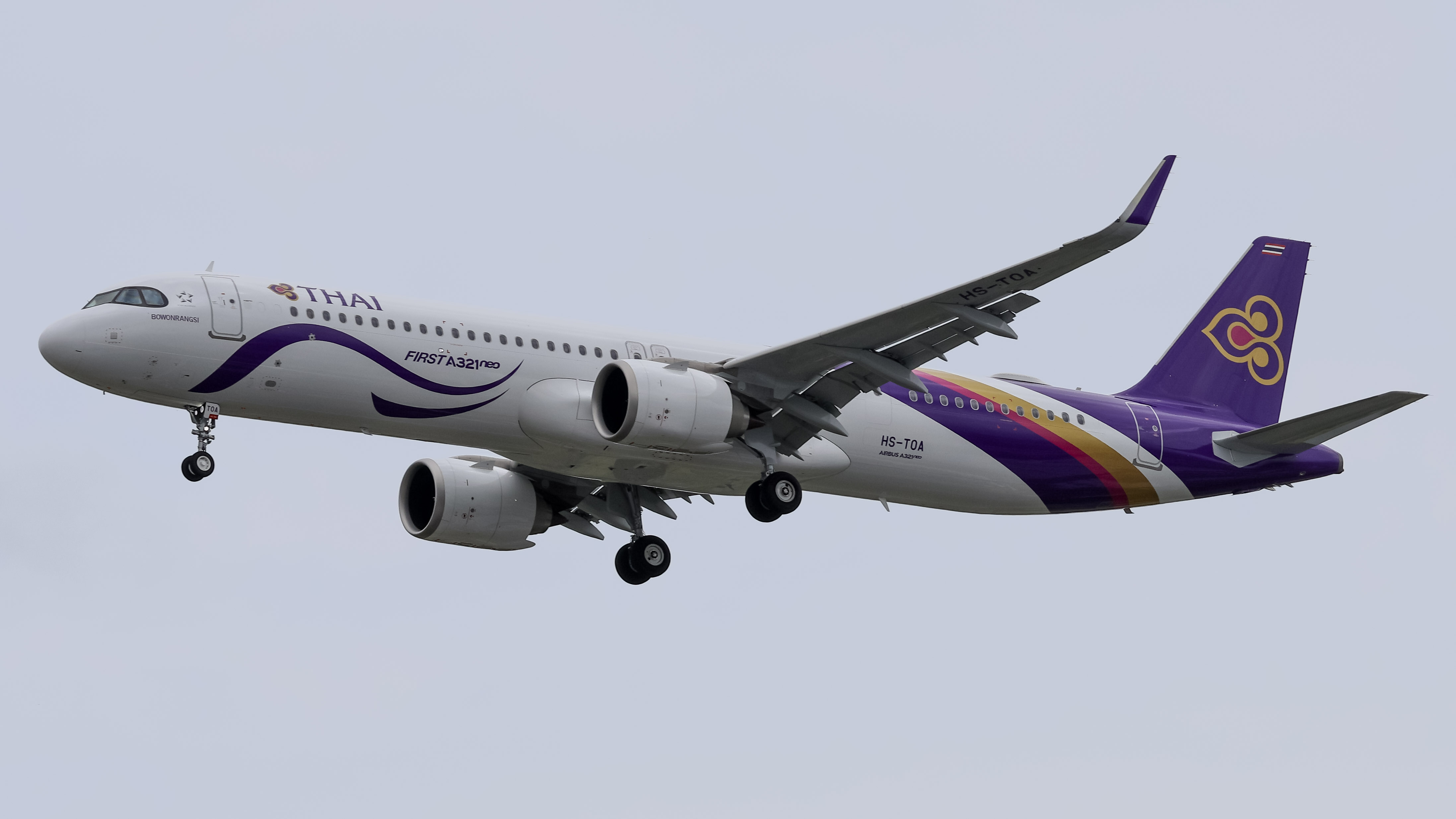
Thai Airways Airbus A321neo, 2026

After a four-year rehabilitation process, on 16 June 2025, the Central Bankruptcy Court granted permission for Thai Airways to exit its rehabilitation program, as the airline had achieved the four conditions required by the plan: formation of a new board, EBITDA of ฿40,000 million (double the benchmark set), disciplined repayments without default, and a registered capital increase with debt-to-equity conversion. The airline later resumed trading on the Stock Exchange of Thailand on 4 August 2025, with an opening price of ฿10.5 per share, representing a 134.4% increase from the capital increase offering price of ฿4.48 per share, and a market capitalization of nearly ฿300,000 million. During an interview with the Bangkok Post on 24 August 2025, Chai Eamsiri, Chief Executive Officer of Thai Airways, revealed that the airline plans to double the frequencies of its flights to Guangzhou and Beijing, increasing from seven to fourteen per week for each destination. Thai Airways will also resume services to Xiamen, Chongqing, and Changsha, each with seven weekly flights, and will introduce new routes to Wuhan and Shenzhen. In addition, the airline is considering launching a new route to Gaya, along with several new domestic routes, in line with the delivery of new aircraft. To bridge the capacity gap before these aircraft arrive, Thai Airways plans to lease eight to ten wide-body aircraft for a period of six years, with a final decision expected in September 2025. The airline will also commence a cabin refurbishment program across its Airbus A320, Airbus A350-900, and Boeing 777-300ER fleets.

== Branding ==
=== Safety video ===
The current safety video was introduced in 2018. Sueb Nakhasathien Foundation president Rungsit Kanjanavanit stated his belief that the video does not sufficiently reflect Thai culture as the animals and flowers used are more commonly found in South America.

=== The launch of Thai Smile ===
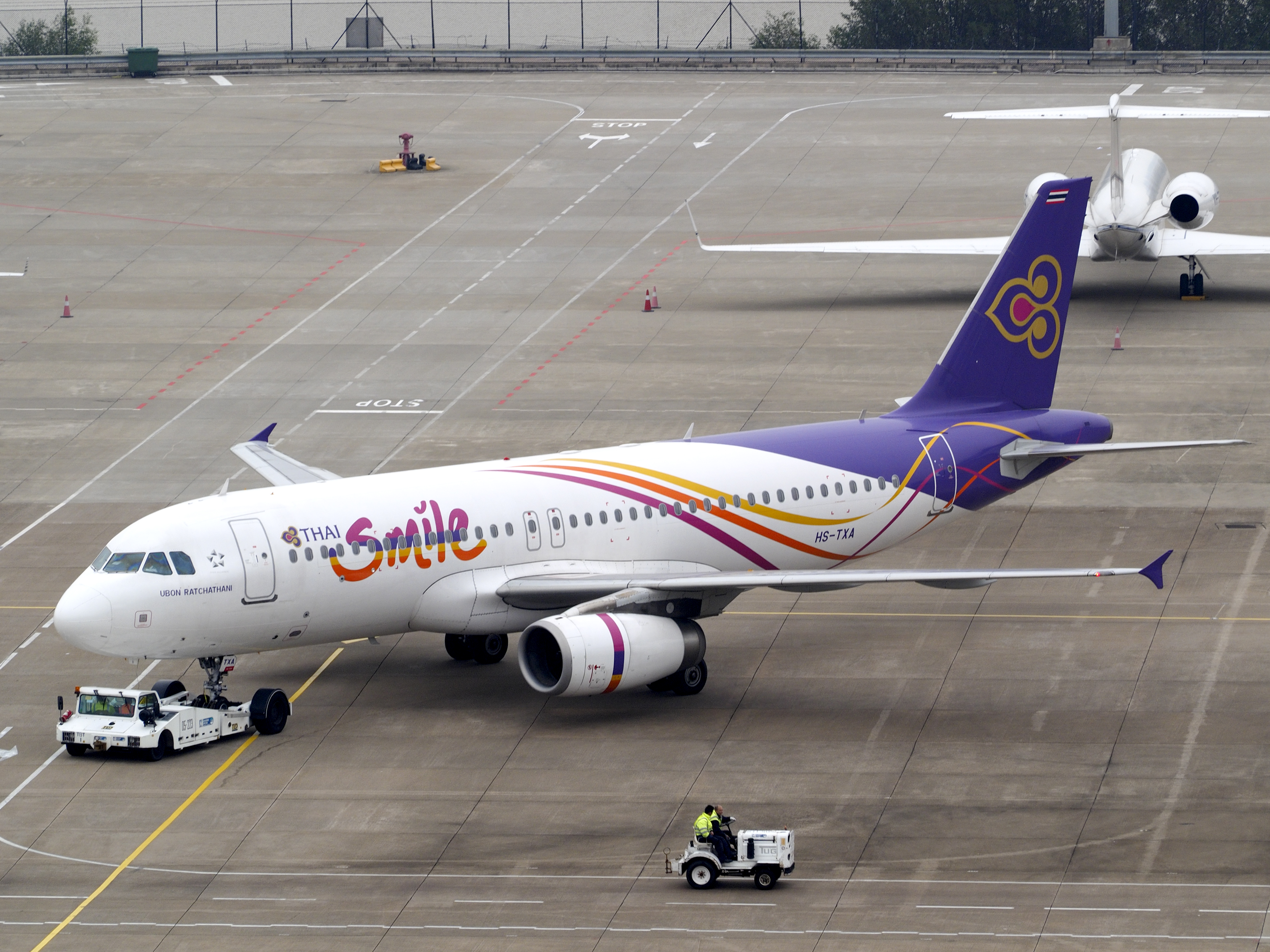
Thai Smile Airbus A320-200 (HS-TXA)

As part of THAI's broader growth strategy in the region, THAI launched a regional carrier with light-premium services, Thai Smile, which operates the narrow-bodied Airbus A320-200 on regional and domestic routes. The new airline began commercial operations in July 2012, after its first A320s were received. As of September 2020, Thai Smile files to 31 destinations and a fleet of 20 aircraft with Chiang Mai International Airport being its focus city.

By September 2016, Thai Smile, Thai's subsidiary announced new services to Gaya, Varanasi, Jaipur, and Lucknow in India marking the expansion of Thai's Asian network.

In the fourth quarter of 2016, Thai Smile vowed to resume its suspended routes and Thai's terminated regional routes to Da Nang, Kota Kinabalu, Luang Prabang and Mandalay. Also the airline has considered launching new services to Hangzhou and Zhengzhou. Due to the financial complications caused by the COVID-19 pandemic, Thai Smile ceased operations in 2023 as a part of the financial reconstruction. All the Thai Smile aircraft are to be reabsorbed by THAI Airways.

=== Subsidiaries ===
==== Thai Catering ====
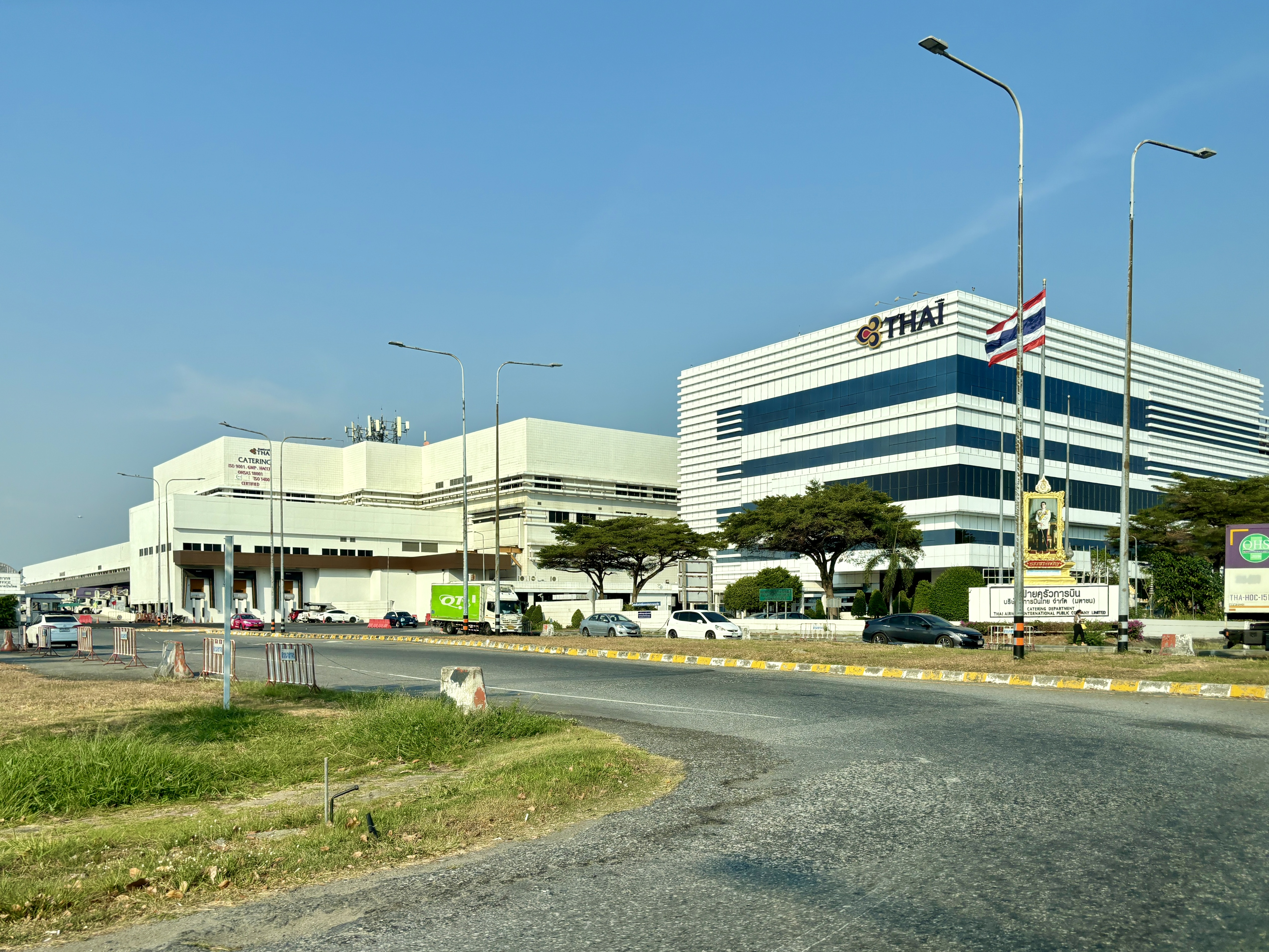
THAI Catering at Suvarnabhumi Airport

Thai Catering began operations on 20 April 1960 by renting out a hangar at Don Mueang Airport for airline meal production. The current headquarters are located at Suvarnabhumi Airport in a 120,000 square meters facility and is able to produce 87,000 meals per day. The facility at Don Mueang Airport remains in use as a bakery production facility, food supply for airline lounges, as well as food production for banquet services and Thai Catering restaurants in domestic airports around the country. Another facility is open for producing food for flights departing from in Krabi Airport. Thai Catering received the Best Economy Class Onboard Catering Award from Skytrax between 2011-2014 and 2016-2018.

In 1995, after reporting losses within the subsidiary after the airline released a new policy of not serving food outside meal service times, Puff and Pie Bakery House was established and its first branch opened on 19 November 1997 near Don Mueang Airport with an aim to increase revenue for the airline. A total of 19 Puff and Pie Branches can be found in Bangkok, primarily found in government offices and hospitals, providing bakery items and microwaveable meals from Thai Catering. In 2021, Puff and Pie cooperated with Inthanin Coffee, a subsidiary of Bang Chak Corporation, with the aim of expanding the distribution of its products to at least 100 branches of Inthanin Coffee in Bang Chak gas stations by 2022.

== Liveries and logos ==
In 2006, Thai Airways moved its hub to the new Suvarnabhumi Airport. Coinciding with the arrival of new aircraft in the mid-2000s, as well as its new hub in Bangkok, the airline launched a brand renewal by introducing new aircraft livery, new aircraft seating, and revamped ground and air service.

The logo on the tail fin shows the traditional Thai greeting gesture (wai), and the curves represents traditional Thai architecture of the decorative structure called lamyong that are common on temple roofs to distinguish different tiers in the structure. The gold represents the colour of Thai Temples, while the magenta signifies magnolia blossom, where finally the purple represents the Thai Orchid - a colour that is used throughout the airline from uniforms to interior cabin colour schemes.

=== Special liveries ===
In 1999, THAI first painted the Royal Barge Suphannahong aircraft livery on its Boeing 747-400 (HS-TGJ) aircraft, royally bestowed the name “Haripunchai” on the occasion of the Sixth Cycle Birthday of King Rama IX. This also applied on another Boeing 747-400 (HS-TGO, Bowonrangsi), making both aircraft identical.

To mark the Coronation of the King Rama X, Thai Airways used a Boeing 777-300 (HS-TKF) to put the Suphannahong Royal Barge as its aircraft livery.

As of 2025, two aircraft, HS-THQ and HS-THU, feature the Star Alliance livery.

Star Alliance Livery

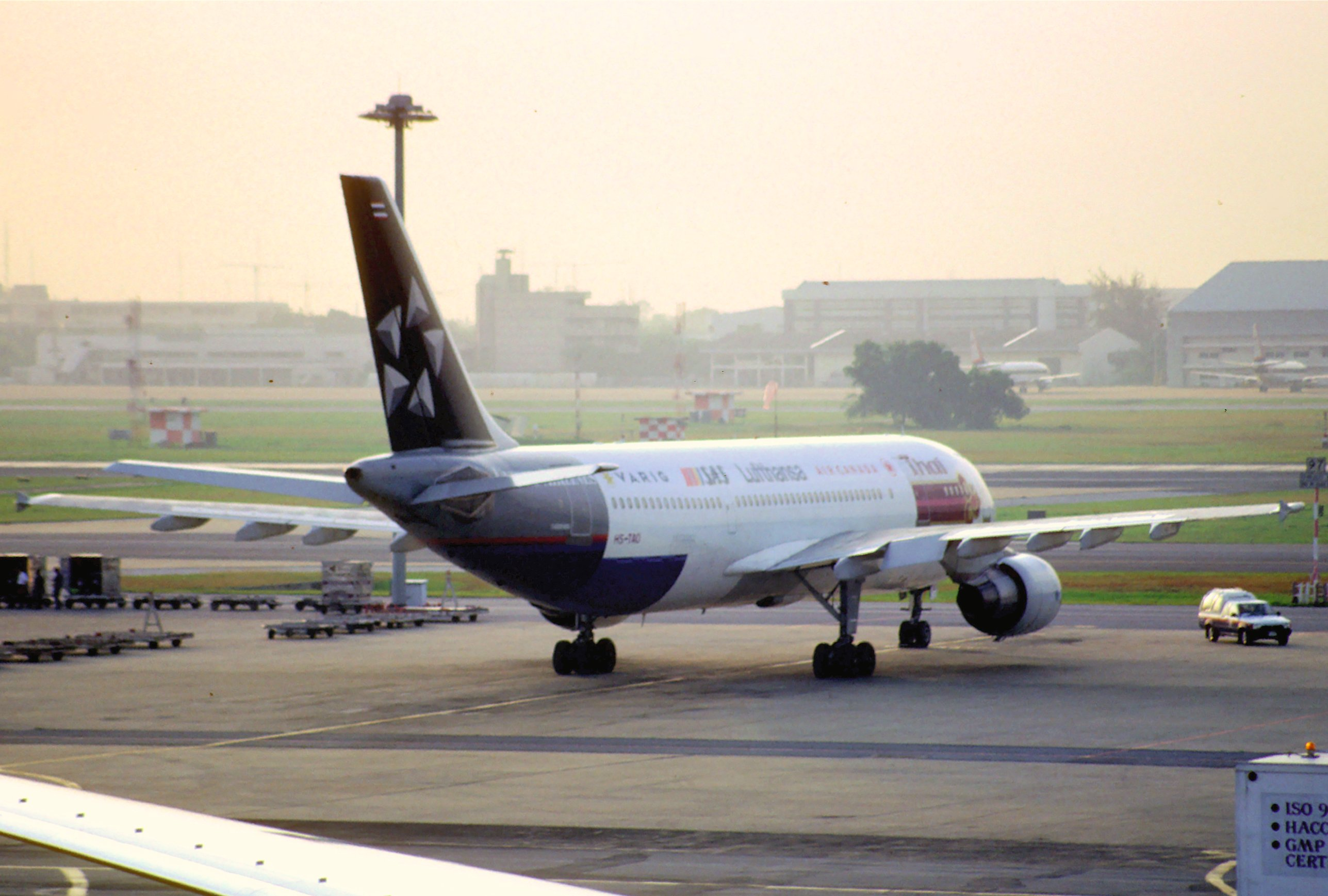
Airbus A300B4-622R (HS-TAO)

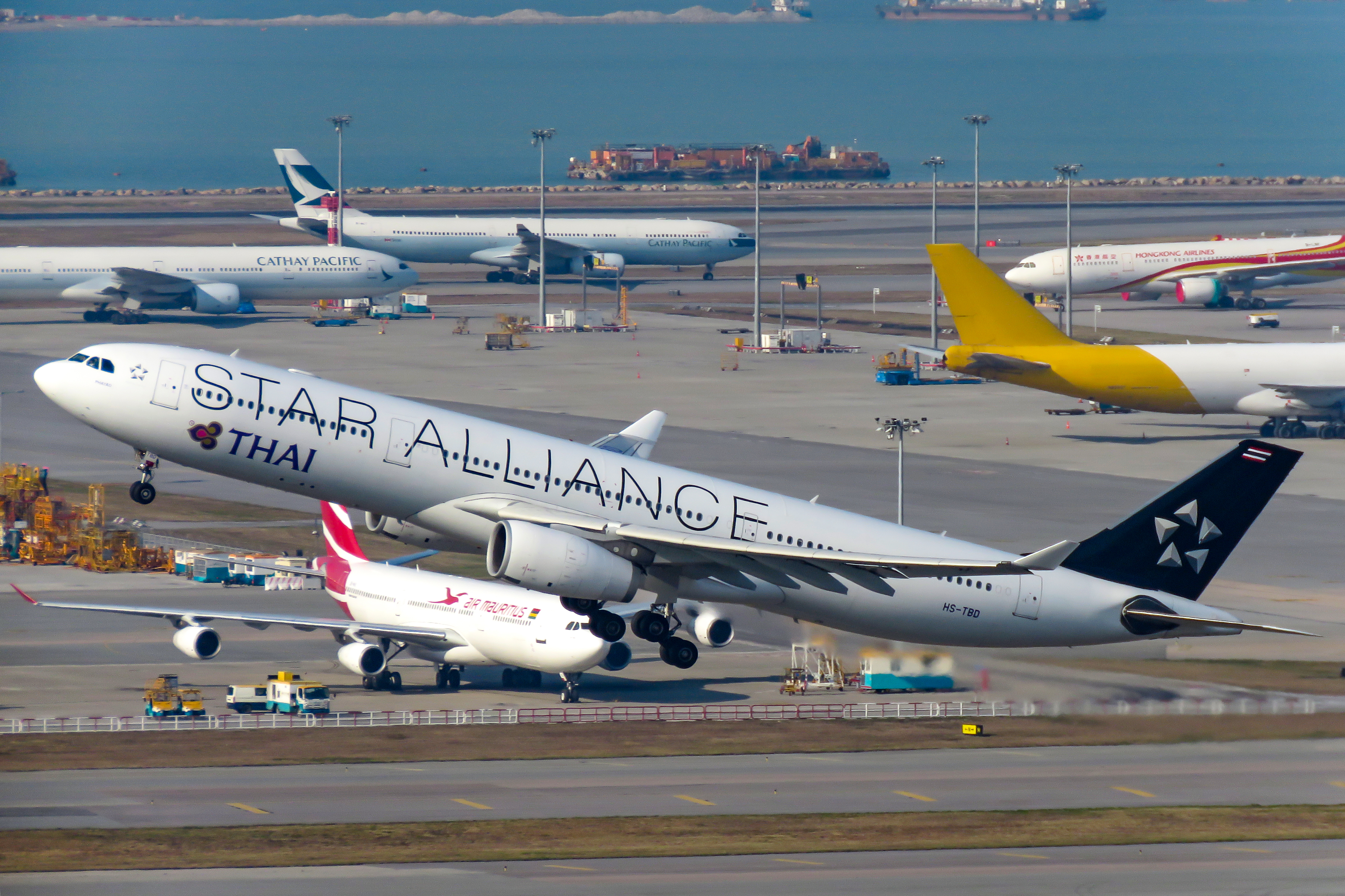
Airbus A330-343 (HS-TBD)

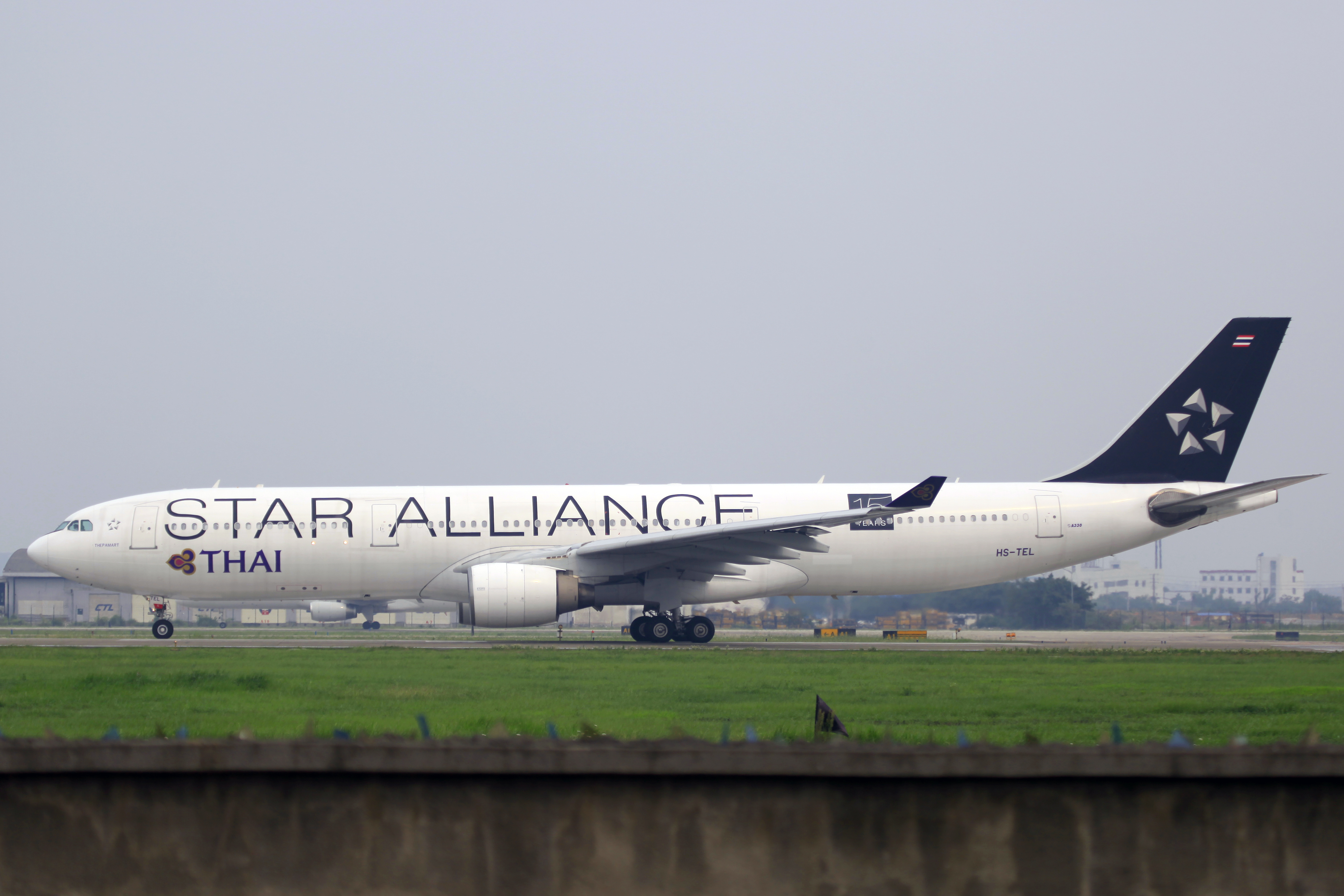
Airbus A330-322 (HS-TEL)

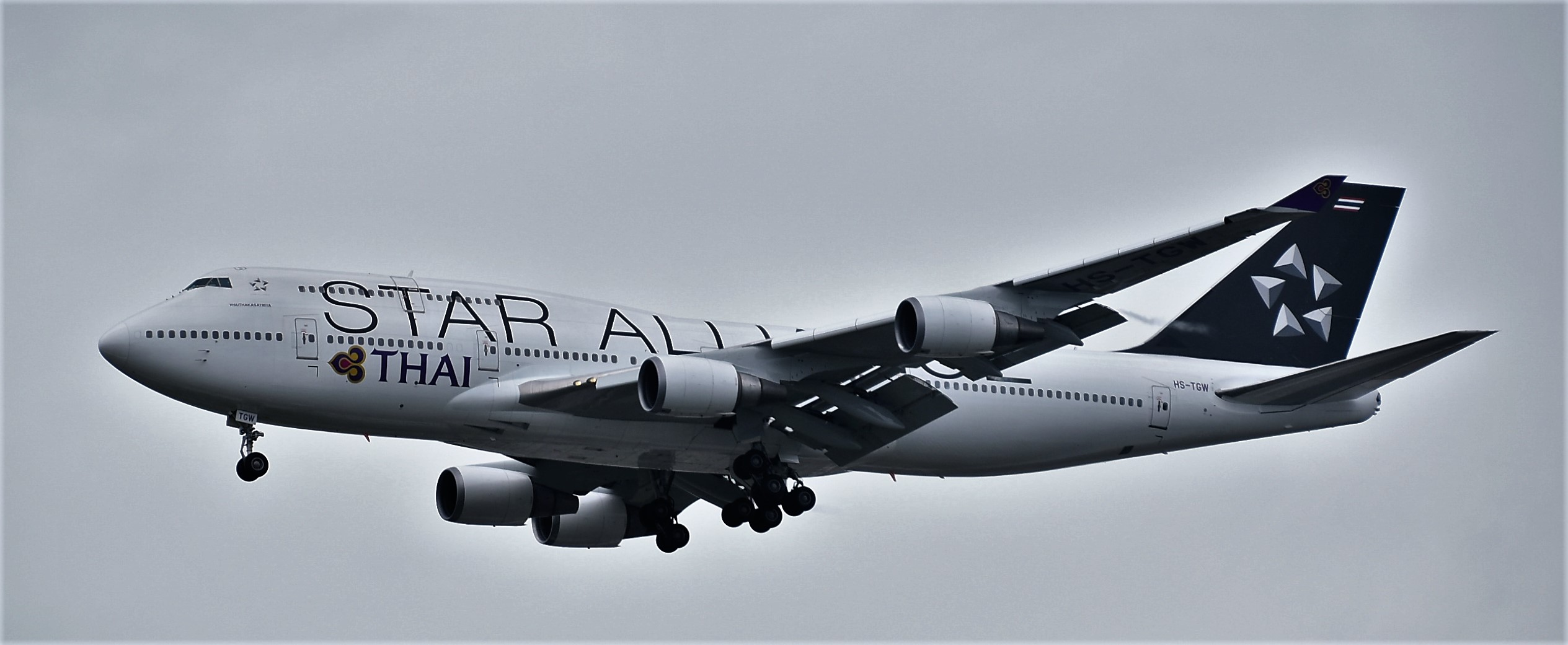
Boeing 747-4D7 (HS-TGW)

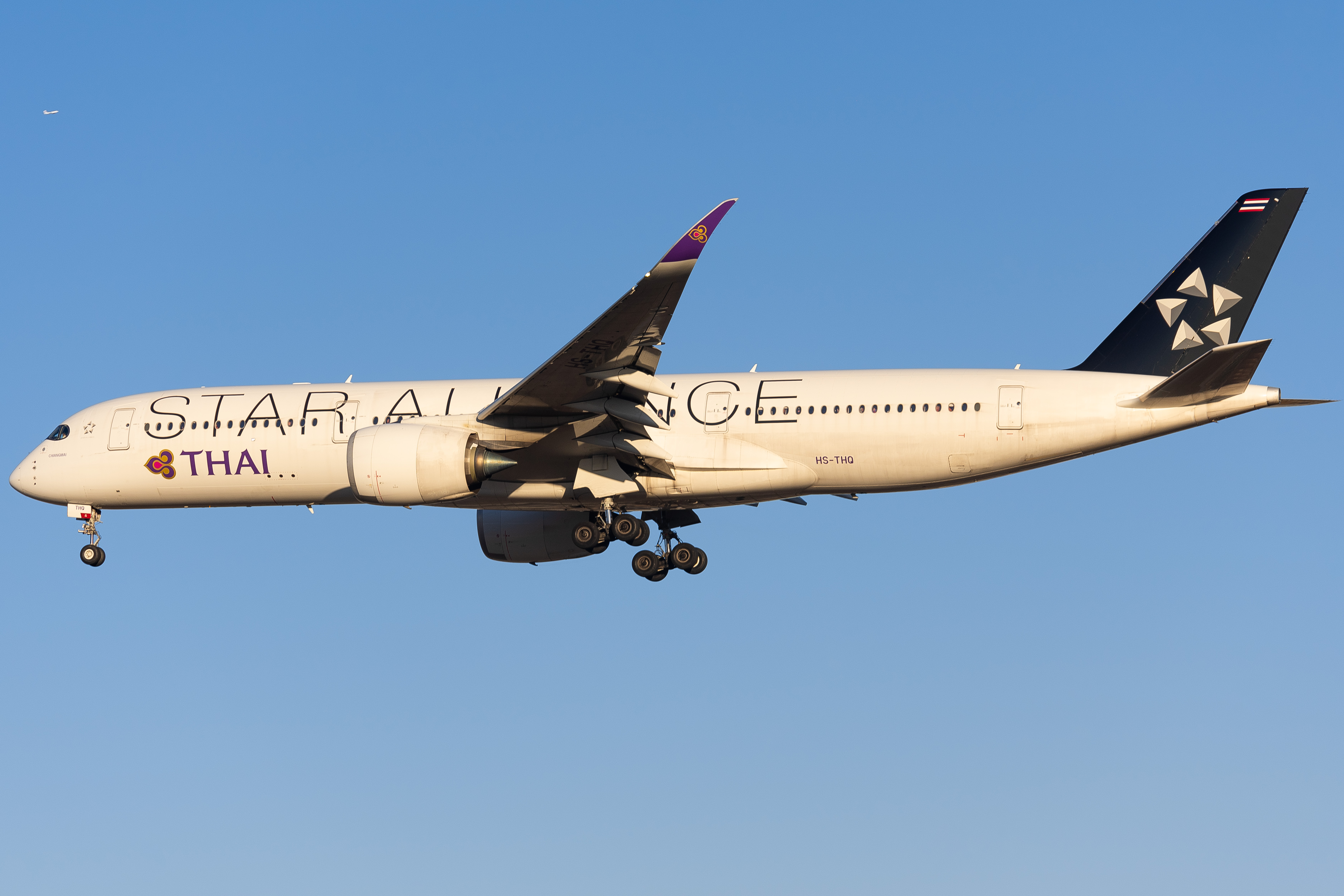
Airbus A350-941 (HS-THQ)

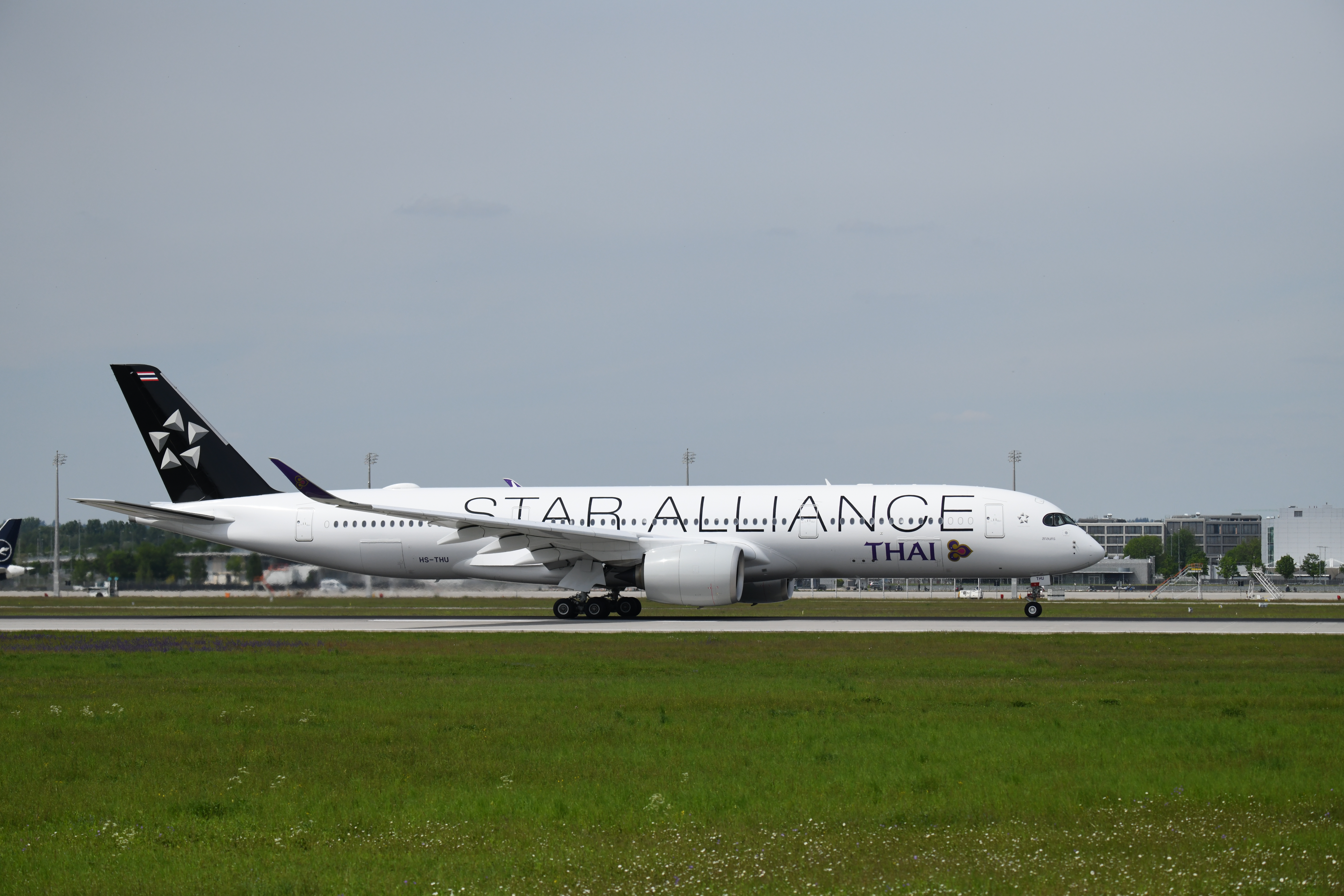
Airbus A350-941 (HS-THU)
Other Livery

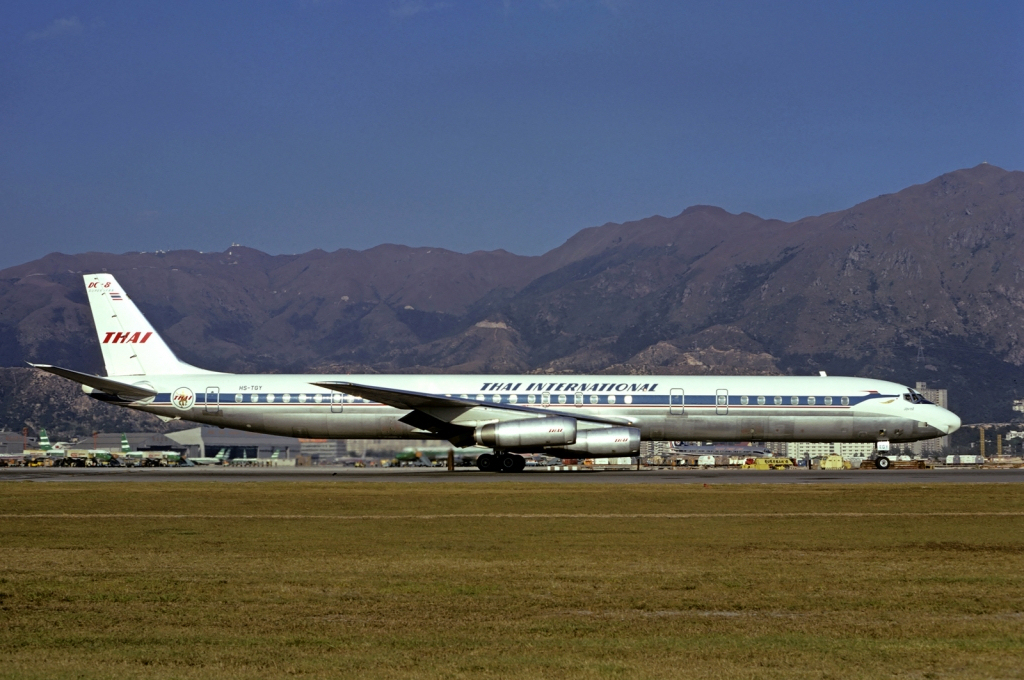
Douglas DC-8-63 (HS-TGY) in Classical Thai Dancer livery

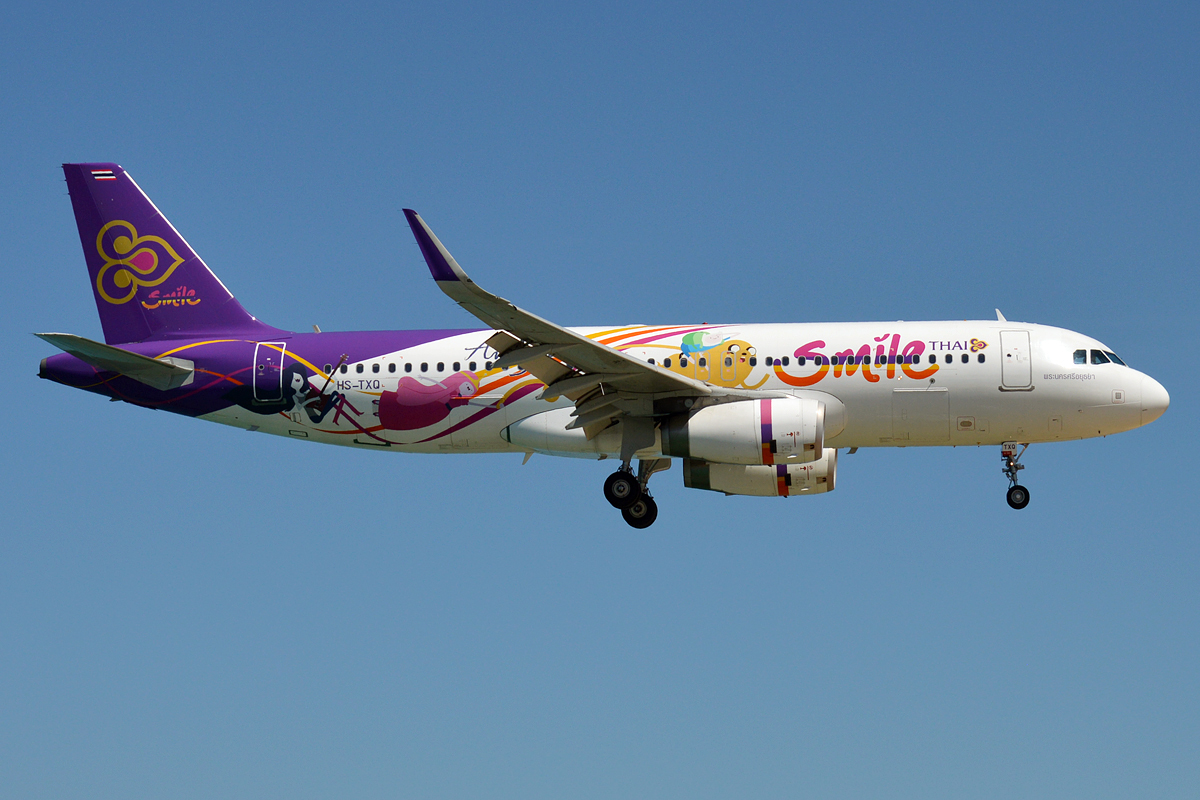
Thai Smile Airbus A320-232 (WL) (HS-TXQ) in Cartoon Network Livery

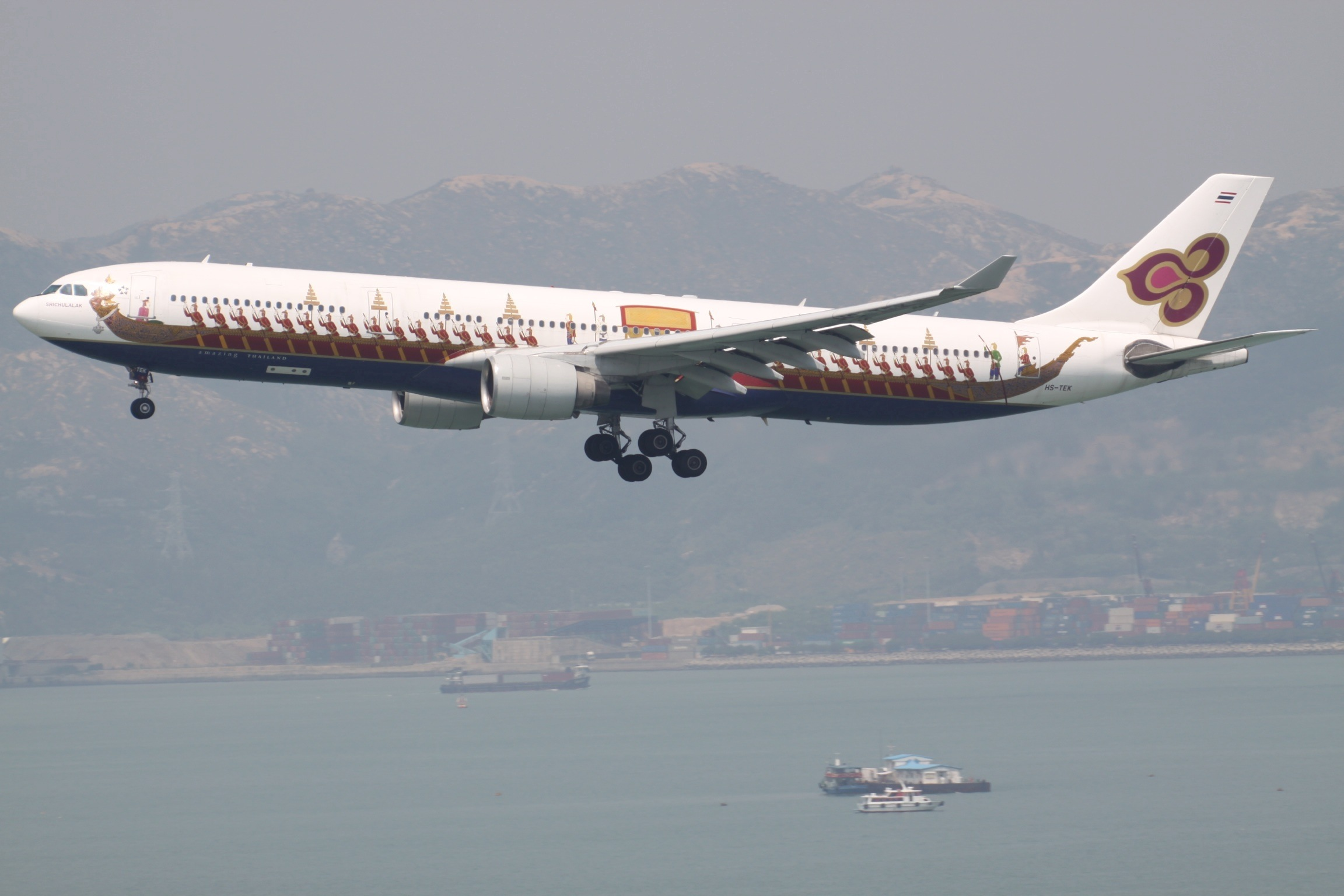
Airbus A330-322 (HS-TEK) in the Royal Barge Narai Song Suban Livery.

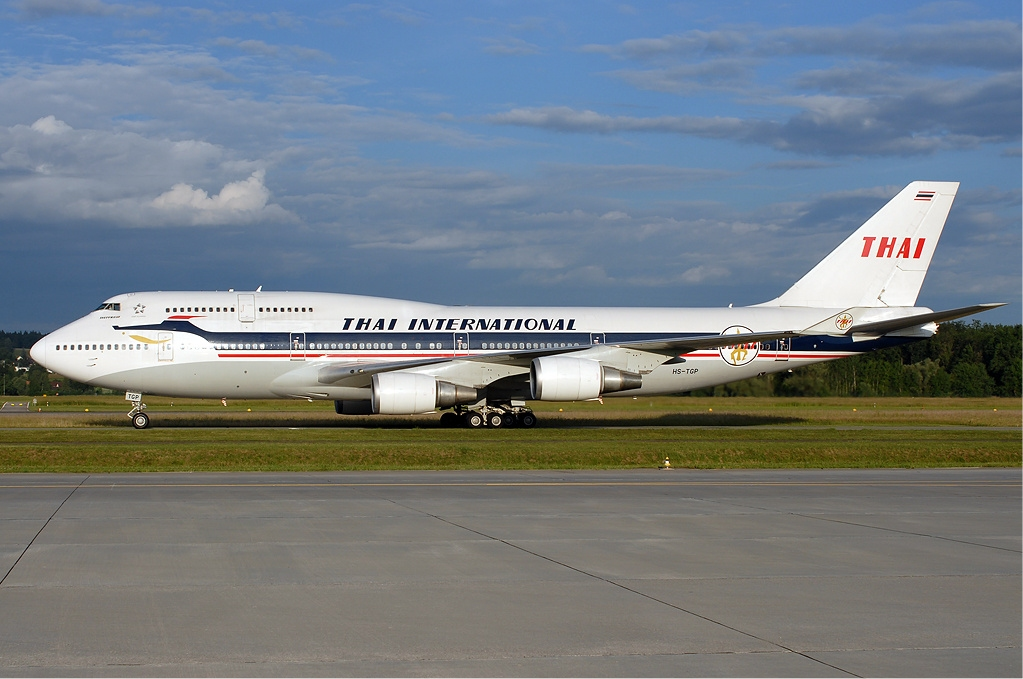
Boeing 747-4D7 (HS-TGP) in the retro livery

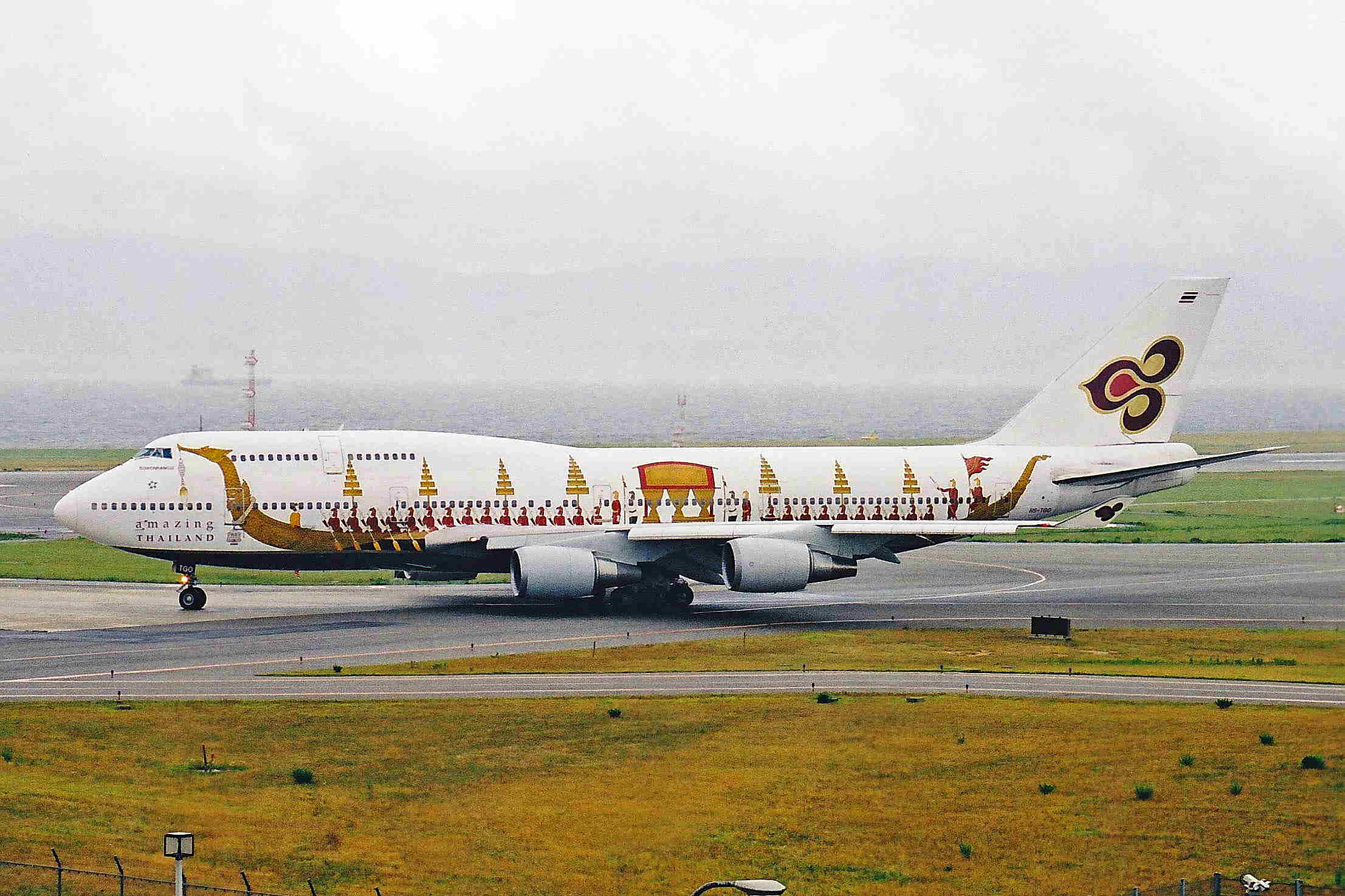
Boeing 747-4D7 (HS-TGO) in the Royal Barge Suphannahong livery

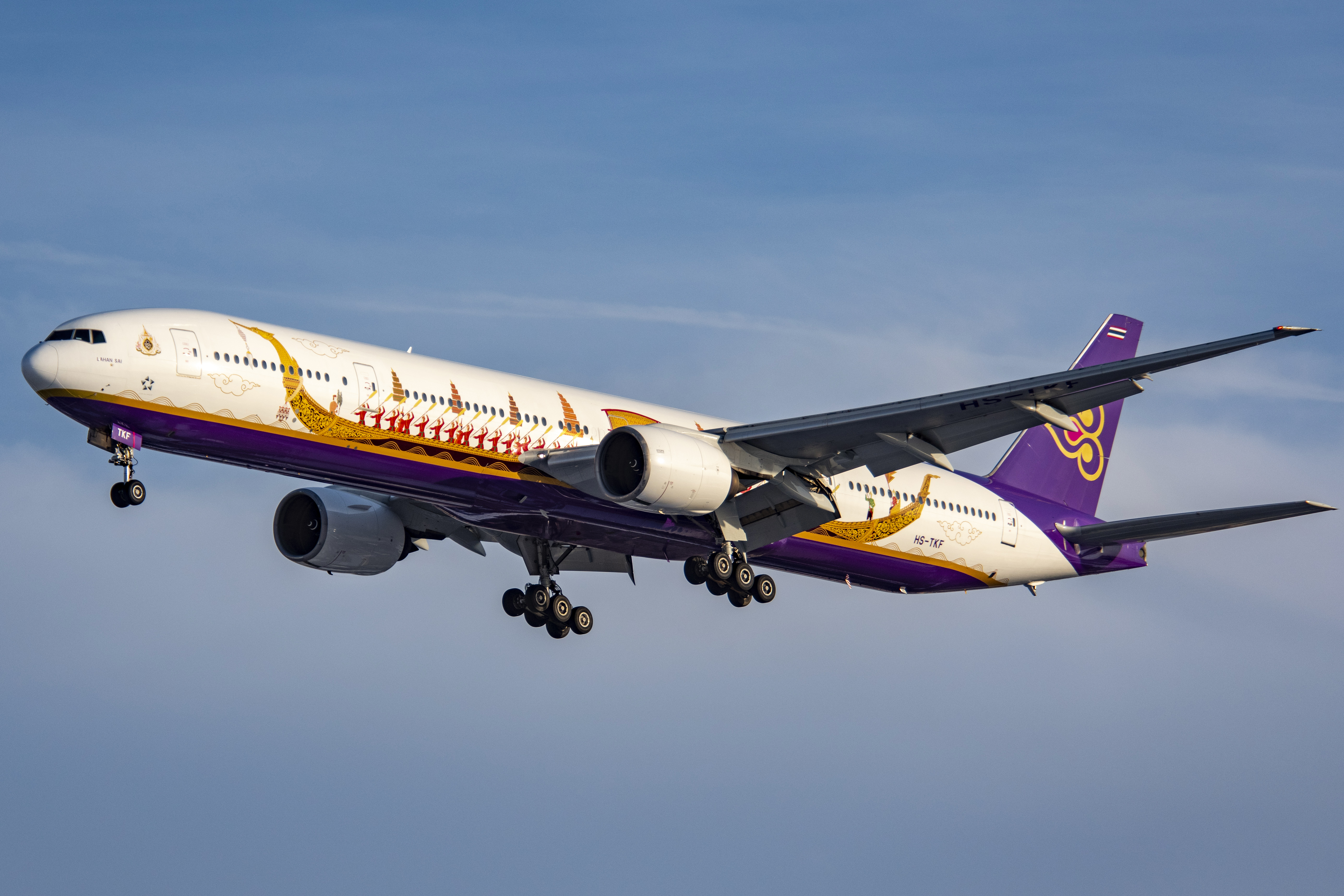
Boeing 777-3D7 (HS-TKF) in the Royal Barge Suphannahong livery

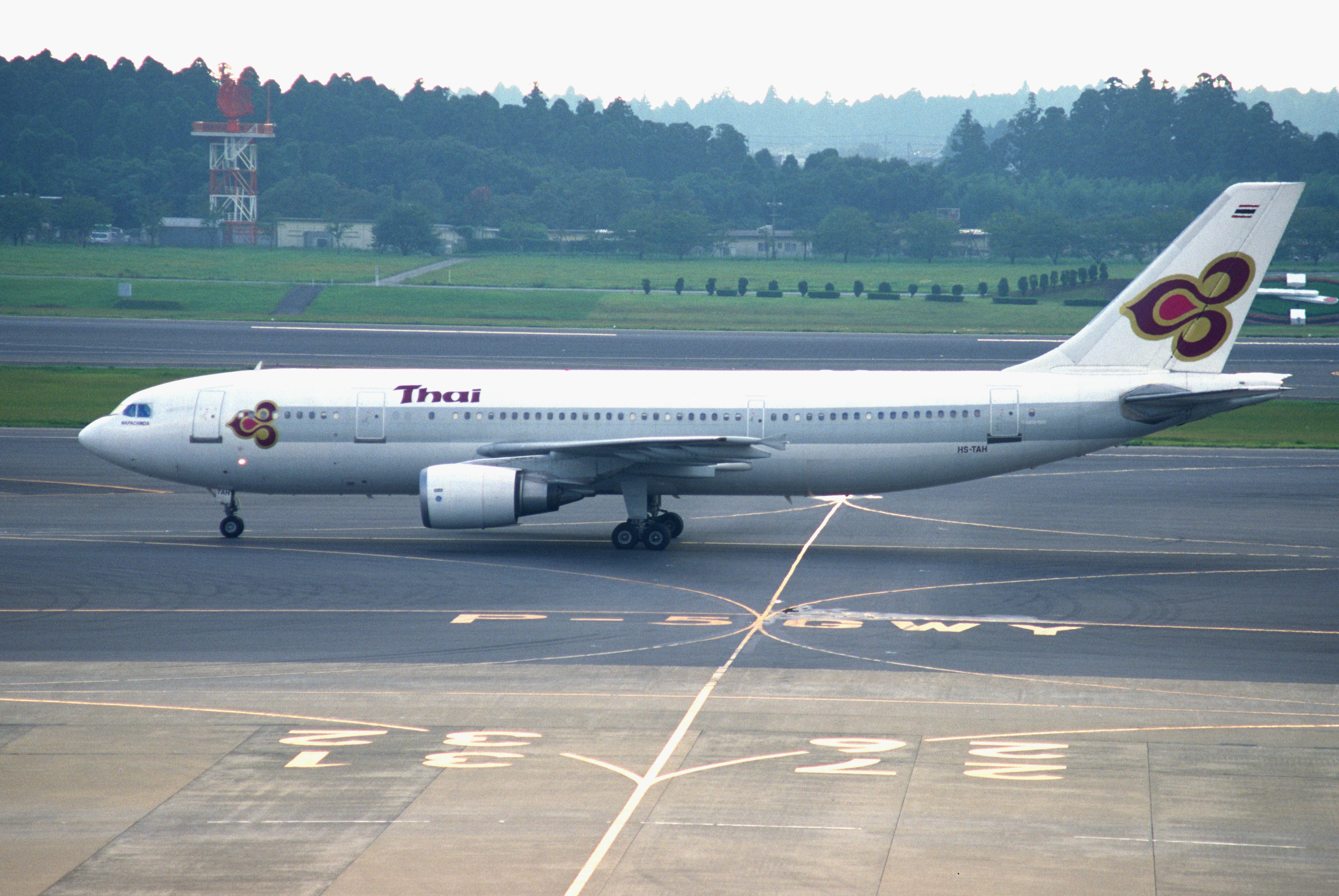
Airbus A300-605R (HS-TAH) in the Speedline livery

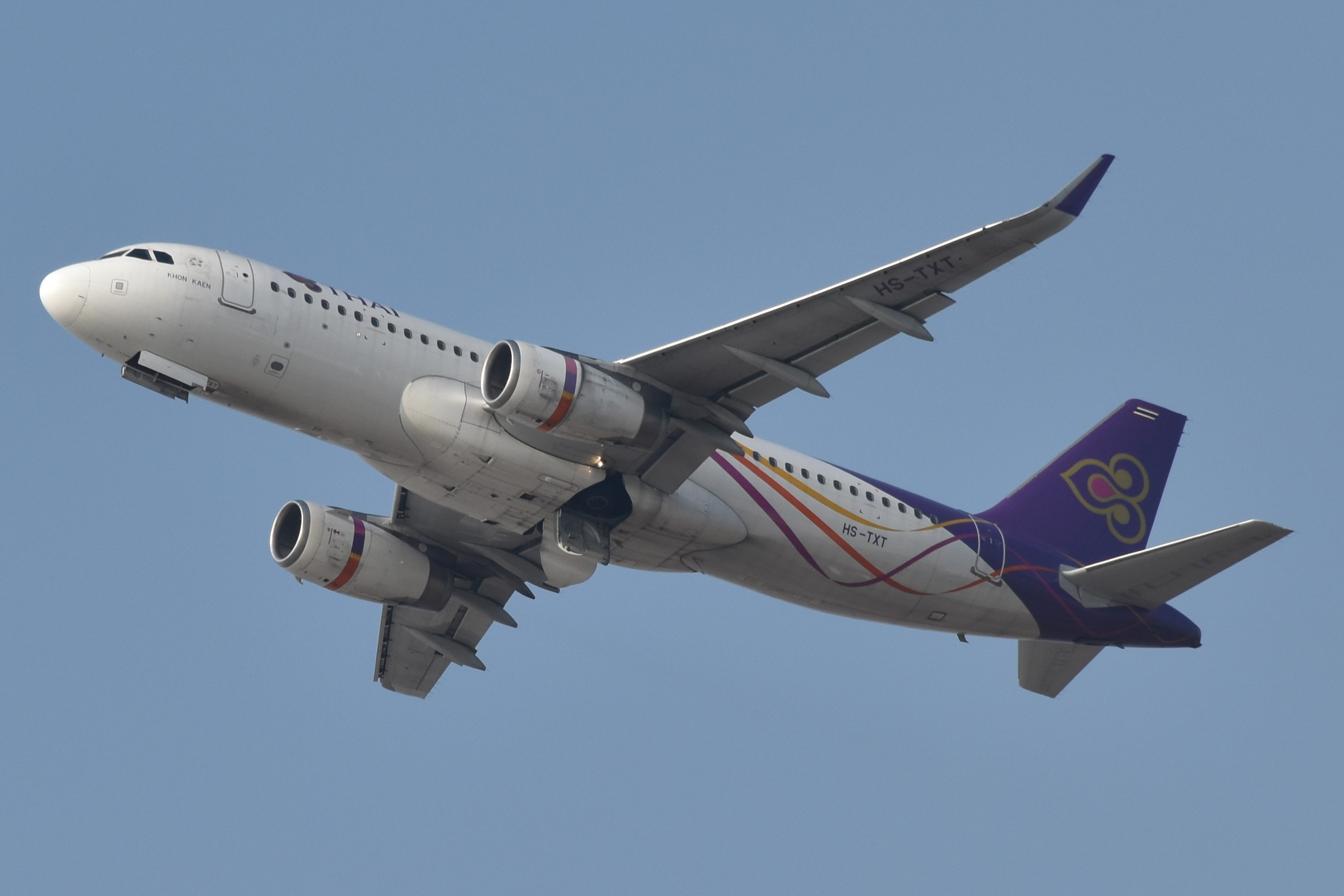
Airbus A320-232 (WL) (HS-TXT) in Ribbon Livery

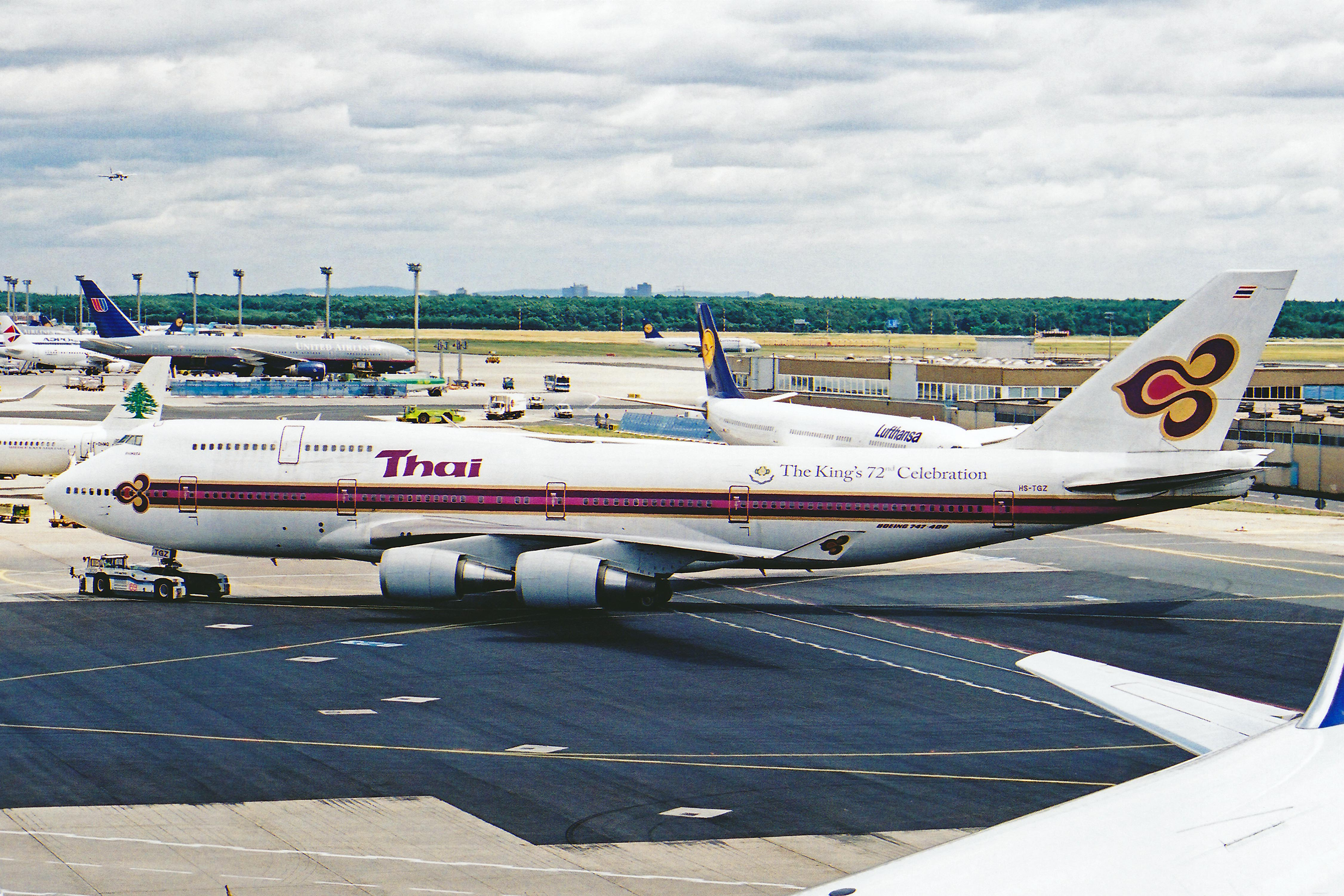
Boeing 747-4D7 (HS-TGZ) in The King 72nd Celebration livery

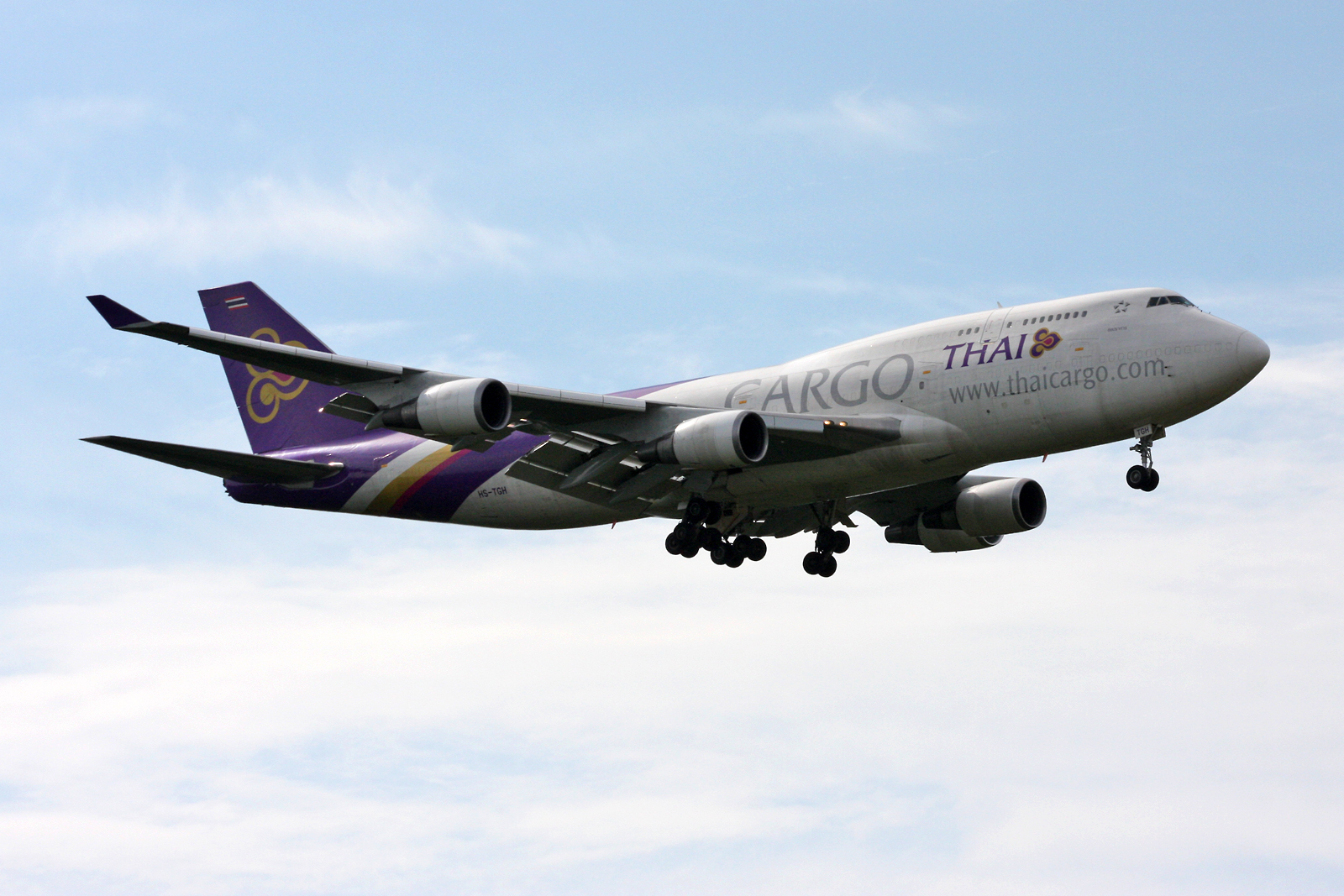
Boeing 747-4D7 (BCF) (HS-TGH) in the Thai Airways International Cargo livery

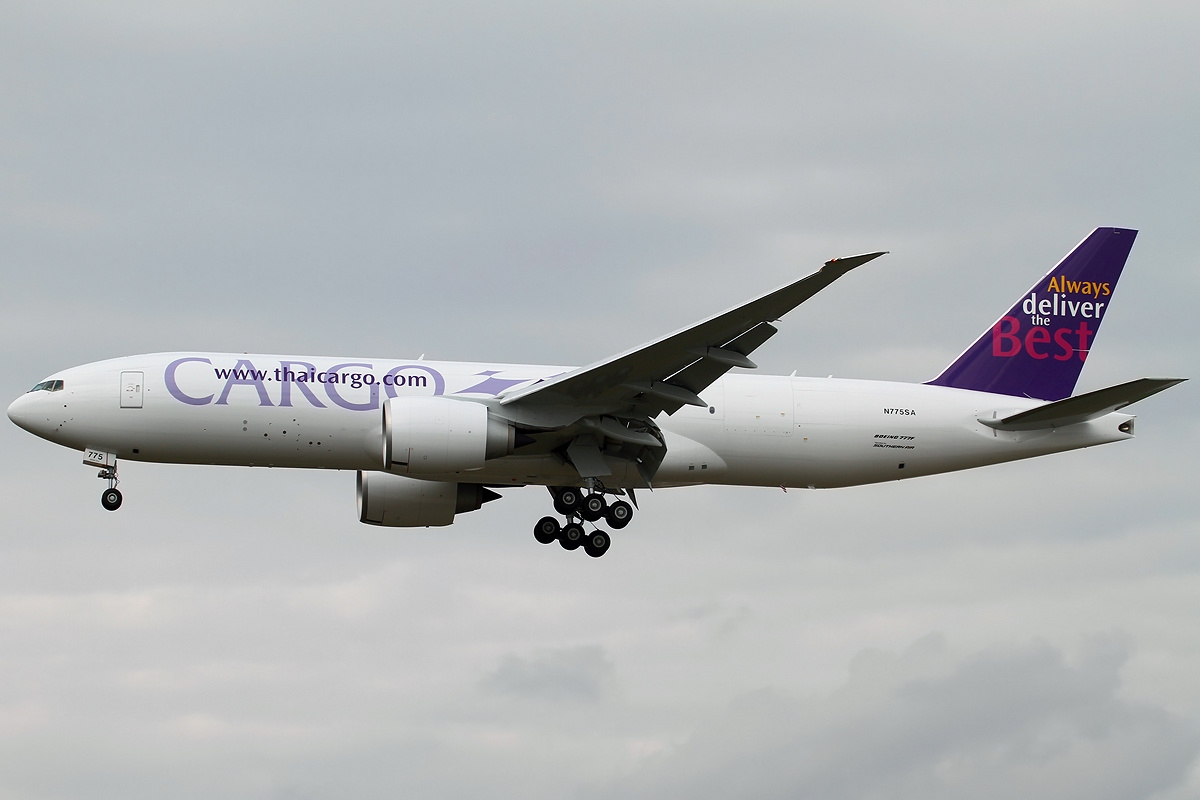
Boeing 777-FZB (N775SA) in the Always Deliver The Best livery

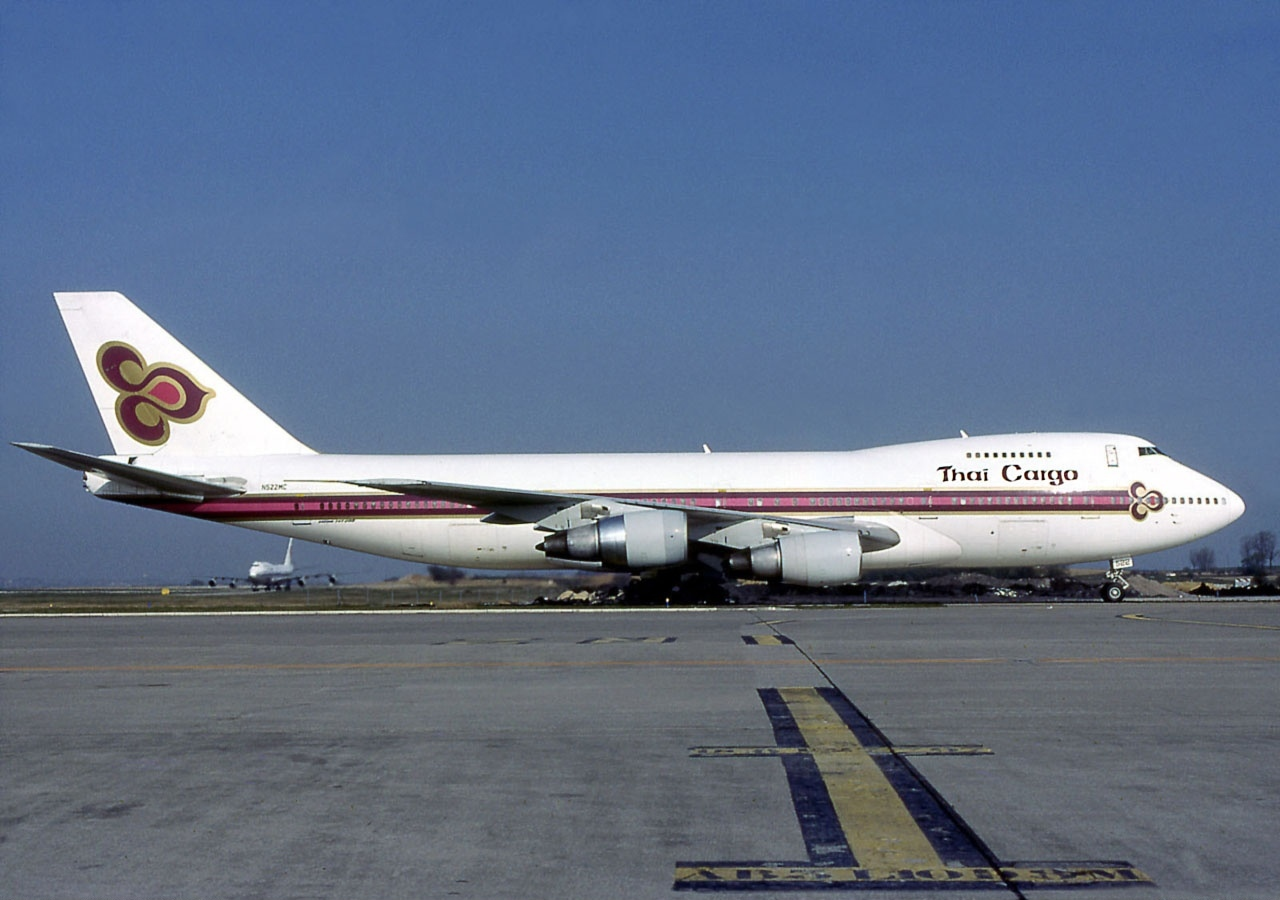
Boeing 747-2D7B (SF) (N522MC) in the Thai Airways International Lowercase letter Cargo livery

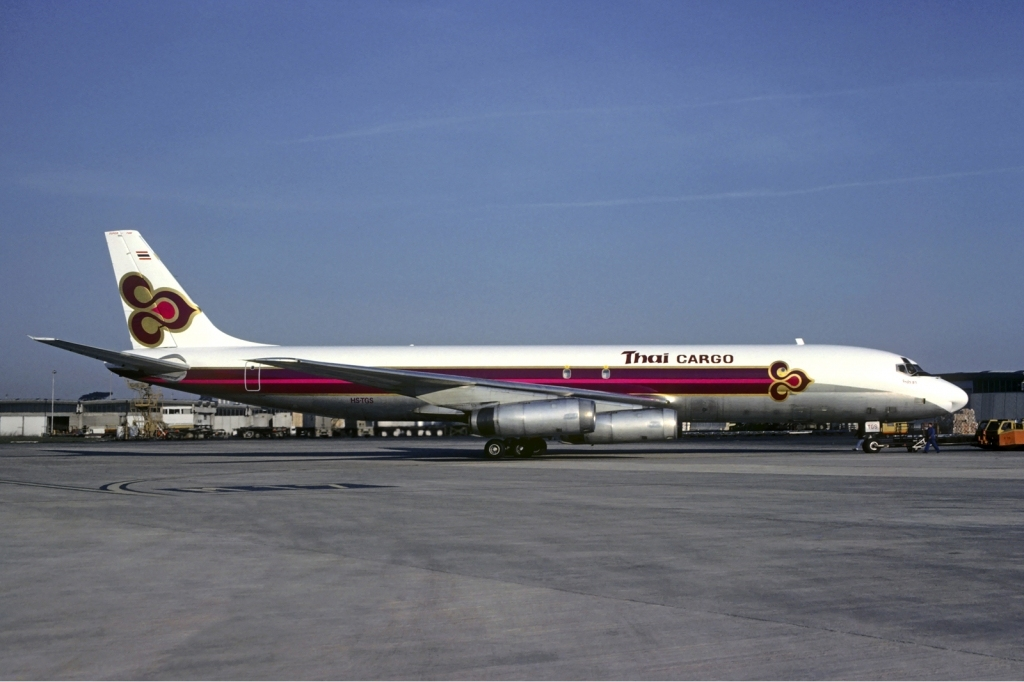
Douglas DC-8-62AF (HS-TGS) in the Thai Airways International Capital Letter CARGO livery

== Corporate affairs ==
=== Business trends ===
The key trends of Thai Airways are (as at the financial year ending December 31):

| Year | Total Revenue (million) | Net profit (Loss) (million) | Total Assets (million) | Total Liabilities (million) | Number of passengers (000) | Cabin Factor | Number of aircraft | Notes/Sources |
|---|---|---|---|---|---|---|---|---|
| 2010 | ฿184,270 | ฿15,350 | ฿293,760 | ฿210,850 | 18,165 | 73.6% | 90 | |
| 2011 | ฿194,342 | (฿10,197) | ฿274,445 | ฿211,010 | 18,398 | 70.4% | 89 | |
| 2012 | ฿213,530 | ฿6,510 | ฿304,096 | ฿234,278 | 20,615 | 76.6% | 95 | |
| 2013 | ฿211,605 | (฿12,000) | ฿307,085 | ฿250,166 | 21,510 | 74.1% | 100 | |
| 2014 | ฿203,889 | (฿15,573) | ฿307,267 | ฿265,971 | 19,096 | 68.9% | 102 | |
| 2015 | ฿192,591 | (฿13,047) | ฿302,471 | ฿269,545 | 21,249 | 72.9% | 95 | |
| 2016 | ฿181,446 | ฿47 | ฿283,124 | ฿249,536 | 22,262 | 73.4% | 95 | |
| 2017 | ฿190,535 | (฿2,072) | ฿280,775 | ฿248,762 | 24,562 | 79.2% | 100 | |
| 2018 | ฿200,586 | (฿11,569) | ฿268,721 | ฿248,265 | 24,319 | 77.6% | 103 | |
| 2019 | ฿188,954 | (฿12,017) | ฿256,665 | ฿244,899 | 24,511 | 79.1% | 103 | |
| 2020 | ฿48,636 | (฿141,180) | ฿208,791 | ฿337,456 | 5,871 | 64.7% | 103 | |
| 2021 | ฿21,572 | ฿56,498 | ฿161,219 | ฿232,469 | 1,640 | 19.1% | 87 | |
| 2022 | ฿97,514 | (฿5,088) | ฿198,299 | ฿261,792 | 9,012 | 67.9% | 86 | |
| 2023 | ฿165,492 | ฿28,123 | ฿238,991 | ฿282,133 | 13,763 | 79.7% | 70 | |
| 2024 | ฿192,821 | (฿35,044) | ฿292,508 | ฿246,919 | 16,143 | 78.8% | 79 | |

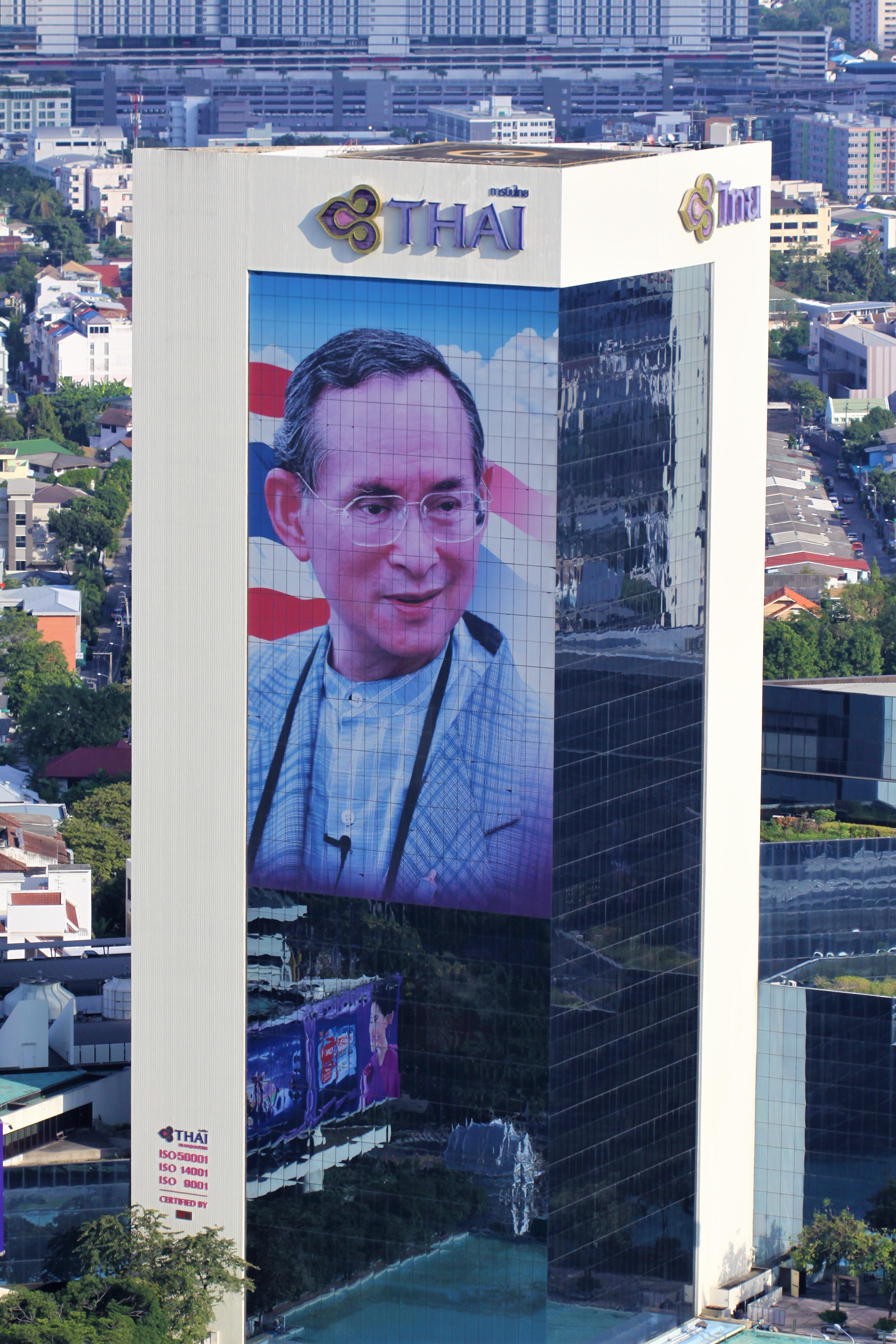
Thai Airways' corporate headquarters in Chatuchak district, Bangkok

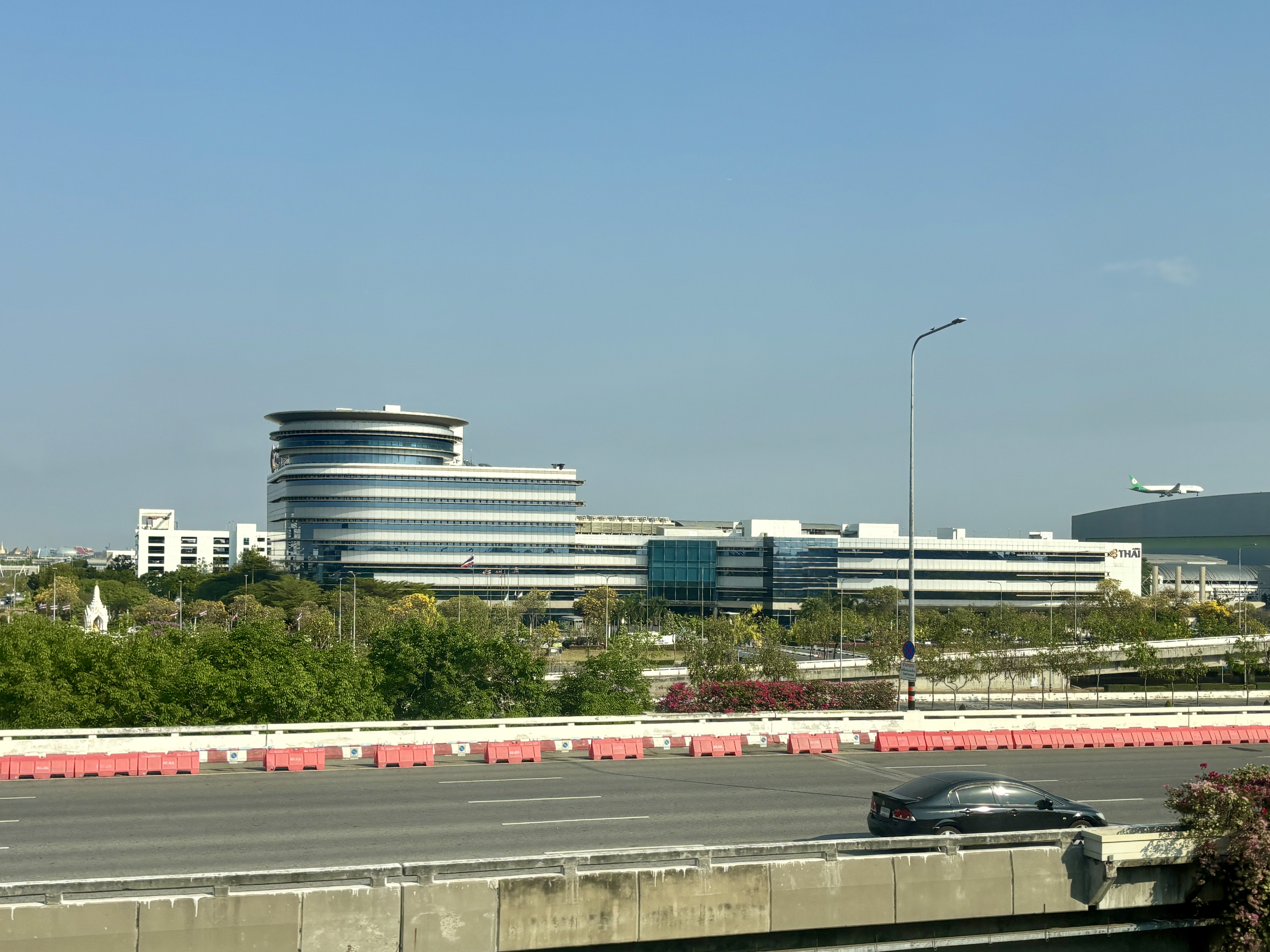
THAI Operation Control Center at Suvarnabhumi Airport

As of October 2019, Thai's accumulated debt amounted to more than 100 billion baht, prompting a deputy transport minister to question "...how serious the airline's executives were in dealing with the worsening financial situation." Thai reported a net loss of 4.68 billion baht in the third quarter of 2019 and a 10.91 billion baht net loss for the first nine months of 2019. Thai's president lamented that, "...such losses were normal for airlines amid fierce competition and price dumping to win customers," a statement contradicted by the performance of other airlines in the region such as VietJet Air.

At the commencement of 2014, Thai was subject to a rumor that the company would declare bankruptcy in May 2014. Listed on the Thai stock exchange, the company was formerly a state enterprise—until 22 May 2020—in which the finance ministry held a stake of up to 51 per cent. In a statement to the media, Chokchai Panyayong, the airways' senior executive vice-president and acting president, stated: "Thai has never once defaulted. Despite its loss in the third quarter of last year, the company still has high liquidity and has a clear plan for debt repayment." He further explained that the carrier's loss of 6.35 billion baht in the third quarter of last year was the result of the company's unsuccessful plan to attract more customers. Thai's financial loss for 2014 was reported to be at 15.6 billion baht (US$479 million), 3.6 billion baht higher than the previous year. Thai blamed declining tourist arrivals from North Asia owing to political unrest in Thailand during the year, but capacity figures from Flightglobal's Innovata Network Data service suggest that Europe was probably an even bigger drain on the bottom line during the year.

=== 2018 recovery plan ===
Thai's new management team has set itself the goal of returning to "sustainable profitability" by 2022 as well as joining the ranks of the world's top five airlines. The centerpiece of its turnaround plan is its proposed 100 billion baht purchase of 23 new aircraft. THAI's chairman pointed to its aging fleet as being expensive to maintain. THAI's 89 aircraft have an average age of 9.3 years compared with competitor Singapore Airlines average age of 7.6 years. Thai's chairman said the company has not yet determined "...what aircraft and type we need to buy because we have yet to finalize financing."

Thai's recovery plans include teaming up with state enterprises Airports of Thailand PCL (AOT) and Krung Thai Bank (KTB) to help drive the carrier to profitability. The team's "first task" is to deliver more tourists to 55 "second-tier" provinces. The Tourism Authority of Thailand (TAT) will assist the team by creating a new campaign, "More Local", to drive tourism to less visited corners of the nation. AOT, which operates Thailand's six international airports, will invest 220 billion baht in infrastructure to increase airport capacity from 2018's 80 million passengers to 185 million in ten years. KTB's contribution to the effort consists of creating new payment solutions for tourists and ramping up travel promotions.

=== Management issues ===
Political interference, corruption and abuse of authority have been persistent issues in Thai's management. Speaking at the World Economic Forum on East Asia, former president Piyasvasti Amranand, who had been abruptly dismissed in May 2012, cited Thai's procurement of A340-500s (three of which had since been grounded) as examples of mismanagement influenced by corruption and political meddling, resulting in operational losses.

At an extraordinary board meeting held on 27 March 2020, Chakkrit Parapuntakul, second vice chairman, was appointed as acting president of Thai Airways effective 11 April 2020.

=== Debt restructuring ===
The Thai government stepped in to provide THAI with a 50bn baht loan guarantee in April 2020 and reaffirmed the airline's status as a state enterprise. The move was taken in the absence of a "get well" plan. A week later, the bailout loan was withdrawn and the cabinet replaced it with a plan to have Thai file with the Central Bankruptcy Court for debt restructuring. As of March 2021, the airline is 410 billion baht in debt and 13,000 creditors. This include customers who simply bought tickets and not being refunded by Thai Airways. Most of those customers have waited for close to 2 years and still not being refunded although Thai Airways keeps selling new tickets. Its main creditors are the state-owned Krungthai and Government Savings Banks. The 50bn baht loan it had sought from the government would have kept it afloat for only five months. An 80bn baht capital infusion would have been needed later.

Thai Airways lost its state enterprise status on 22 May 2020 when the Finance Ministry sold off a 3.17% stake in Thai to the Vayupak 1 Fund, thus reducing its former majority shareholding to 47.86%. Thai has appealed to the government for help to forestall the seizure of its aircraft by foreign creditors. The airline sought government help because it has contracts and legal obligations that can only be resolved by the state. These issues must be dealt with before Thai enters debt rehabilitation. Concurrently, investigators are looking into anomalies in Thai ticket sales in 2019. The Transport Ministry reported that Thai ticket sales and freight revenues totalled 140bn baht in 2019, yet Thai had 25.4m passengers at an average ticket price of 6,081 baht, a total of 154.5bn baht. A senior prosecutor, Wanchai Roujanavong, had earlier warned that, "...the proposed rehabilitation of Thai Airways International [is] the opening of a Pandora's Box, which will expose extensive corruption in the ailing national flag carrier which has hitherto been hidden from the public."

On September 14, 2020, the Central Bankruptcy Court has given approval for THAI to enter rehabilitation. THAI has submitted the rehabilitation plan on 2 March 2021. The airline nominated the airline's independent director Piyasvasti Amranand and Chakkrit Parapuntakul, the company's second vice chairman as rehabilitation plan administrators, while the creditors will meet on 12 May 2021 to vote on the rehabilitation plan, and the court is expected to decide whether to endorse the plan between June and July 2021.

On 15 June 2021, the Central Bankruptcy Court set the hearing to read out the court's order with regard to the consideration of THAI's Business Rehabilitation Plan. After receiving two objections against the Business Rehabilitation Plan of THAI, the Planner's clarification, and the official receiver's opinion regarding several issues, the Central Bankruptcy Court granted an order to approve THAI's Business Rehabilitation Plan as well as the amended plan following the acceptance resolution of the creditors' meeting on 19 May 2021. As a result, the Plan Administrator nominations whose names were proposed according to the Business Rehabilitation Plan and the amended plan, i.e. Mr. Piyasvasti Amranand, Mr. Pornchai Thiravet, Mr. Siri Jirapongphan, Mr. Kraisorn Barameeauychai, and Mr. Chansin Treenuchagron, has become the Plan Administrators who are authorized to operate THAI's business and implement the plan.

On 1 July 2022, the Plan Administrator submitted the petition for plan amendment to the official receiver. On 1 September 2022, the Official Receiver held the creditors’ meeting via electronic means (e-Meeting). The creditors who hold 78.59 percent of the total claims of the creditors, who attended the meeting and cast votes, accepted the amendment of the Business Reorganization Plan that the Plan Administrator submitted to the Official Receiver. On 20 October 2022, the Central Bankruptcy Court issued an order approving the proposal for the Plan amendment of the Company.

On 21 October 2022, THAI informed the resignation of the Plan Administrator, effective as of October 21, 2022 as follows: 1. Mr. Kraisorn Barameeauychai 2. Mr. Siri Jirapongphan

On 17 May 2023, Thai Airways International Public Company Limited (THAI) held a creditor committee’s meeting that reached a resolution in favor of the company’s restructuring of business operation in aviation as proposed by the Plan Administrators and THAI management.

=== Corruption ===
On 20 August 2020, then Deputy Transport Minister Thaworn Senniam announced some Thai Airways employees became unusually rich from the 2003-2004 10 Airbus A340's procurement deal and other mismanaged projects, according to a police-led investigation team set up by the Ministry of Transport. The team is forwarding its findings to the National Anti-Corruption Commission and has been informed by the Council of State that it must shut down due to a technicality.

==== Rolls-Royce engine procurement ====
In January 2017, a four-year investigation by the UK's Serious Fraud Office (SFO) determined that aircraft engine-maker Rolls-Royce had paid bribes to Thai Airways employees and government employees in Thailand to secure orders for the Rolls-Royce T800 engine for its Boeing 777-200s. Rolls-Royce admitted to the charge and agreed to pay penalties. The illicit payments of US$36.38M took place between 1991 and 2005. Bribes were paid in three tranches:

- 1 June 1991 – 30 June 1992: Rolls-Royce paid US$18.8M
- 1 March 1992 – 31 March 1997: Rolls-Royce paid US$10.38M
- 1 April 2004 – 28 February 2005: Rolls-Royce paid US$7.2M

The government rejected calls for Prime Minister Prayut Chan-o-cha to use his Section 44 powers to cut through red tape in the investigation of the Rolls-Royce bribery scandal. Response from the Thai government's National Anti-Corruption Commission to information provided by the SFO, is said to be "tepid" and "...could be more embarrassing than the scandal itself."

On 28 August, Thaworn Senneam announced the findings of a House panel which found evidence of bribes of a minimum of 5%, or 2.6 billion baht, on contracts in payments to officials, politicians, and THAI executives. Thaworn alleged that Rolls-Royce paid 245 million baht in bribes through middlemen, and irregular expenses and overtime payments to staff and senior management, with excessive payments to executives costing. On 1 September, the Transport Ministry formally submitted the findings of the probe into alleged irregularities to the Finance Ministry, Prime Minister's Office, and National Anti Corruption Commission for further action.

=== Shareholders ===
Shareholders
| Rank | Shareholders | Shares | % |
|---|---|---|---|
| 1 | Ministry of Finance | 11,010,143,112 | 38.90 |
| 2 | Bangkok Bank Public Company Limited | 2,407,879,062 | 8.51 |
| 3 | Electricity Generating Authority of Thailand Saving and Credit Cooperative Limited | 1,538,121,854 | 5.43 |
| 4 | Krung Thai Bank Public Company Limited | 1,327,322,126 | 4.69 |
| 5 | TMBThanachart Bank Public Company Limited | 579,955,895 | 2.05 |
| 6 | Thammasat University Savings and Credit Cooperative Limited | 475,572,922 | 1.68 |
| 7 | Government Savings Bank | 447,995,117 | 1.58 |
| 8 | Provincial Electricity Authority's Employees Savings and Credit Cooperative Limited | 414,359,908 | 1.46 |
| 9 | Islamic Bank of Thailand | 397,330,248 | 1.40 |
| 10 | PTT Savings and Credit Cooperative, Limited | 380,408,815 | 1.34 |
| 11 | Kasetsart University Savings and Credit Cooperative Limited | 362,706,468 | 1.28 |
| 12 | Dhipaya Insurance Public Company Limited | 303,014,266 | 1.07 |
| 13 | Thai Airways Employee Savings and Credit Cooperative Limited | 267,849,075 | 0.95 |
| 14 | Industrial and Commercial Bank of China (Thai) Public Company Limited | 239,922,951 | 0.85 |
| 15 | Teachers' Saving Cooperative of The General Education Department LTD | 230,848,860 | 0.82 |
| 16 | CU SAVING COOP | 229,646,584 | 0.81 |
| 17 | Land and Houses Bank Public Company Limited | 223,119,580 | 0.79 |
| 18 | Department of Highway Savings and Credit Cooperative Limited | 187,706,263 | 0.66 |
| 19 | The Federation of Savings and Credit Cooperatives of Thailand Limited | 183,952,138 | 0.65 |
| 20 | Mahidol University Saving and Credit Co-Operative, Limited | 176,902,845 | 0.63 |
| 21 | Prudential Life Assurance (Thailand ) Public Company Limited | 170,860,834 | 0.60 |
| 22 | Export-Import Bank of Thailand | 167,339,685 | 0.59 |
| 23 | Vayupak Fund 1 | 165,163,864 | 0.58 |
| 24 | Ocean Life Insurance Public Company Limited | 156,731,572 | 0.55 |
| 25 | Royal Forest Department Savings and Credit Cooperative Limited | 152,826,808 | 0.54 |
| 26 | Natixis | 149,075,847 | 0.53 |
| 27 | CIMB Thai Bank Public Company Limited | 147,368,314 | 0.52 |

== Destinations ==
=== Codeshare agreements ===
Thai Airways International codeshares with the following airlines:

- Aegean Airlines
- Air Canada
- Air China
- Air India
- Air Macau
- Air New Zealand
- All Nippon Airways
- Asiana Airlines
- Austrian Airlines
- Avianca
- Bangkok Airways
- Brussels Airlines
- Copa Airlines
- Croatia Airlines
- Egyptair
- El Al
- Emirates
- Ethiopian Airlines
- EVA Air
- Gulf Air
- Kuwait Airways
- Lao Airlines
- Lufthansa
- Malaysia Airlines
- Oman Air
- Pakistan International Airlines
- Royal Brunei Airlines
- Shenzhen Airlines
- Singapore Airlines
- South African Airways
- Swiss International Air Lines
- TAP Air Portugal
- Turkish Airlines
- United Airlines

== Fleet ==
Thai Airways operates a fleet of both wide-body and narrow-body aircraft from Airbus and Boeing. As of January 2026, the airline has 80 aircraft and 89 on order.

== Aircraft Maintenance Centres ==
THAI maintains three maintenance centres, at U-Tapao International Airport, Don Mueang International Airport, and Suvarnabhumi Airport. The centers service aircraft belonging to other airlines in addition to Thai aircraft.

=== THAI Technical ===
THAI Technical is certified internationally by the Federal Aviation Administration, the Joint Aviation Authorities, the European Aviation Safety Agency Part-145 Maintenance Organisation, and the Japan Civil Aviation Bureau for facilities at Don Mueang International Airport and Suvarnabhumi Airport. It has also received its Requalifier Identification Certificate from the United States Department of Transportation for its operations at U-Tapao International Airport and Suvarnabhumi Airport.

It is certified domestically by the Department of Civil Aviation (Thailand) for all three of its facilities in Thailand.

On 27 February 1998, the department received its ISO 9002 certification from Bureau Veritas Quality International, with ISO 14001 certification granted by the same agency on 16 March 2001.

== Hygiene ==
Thai initiated a program entitled "The Most Hygienic In-Cabin Environment Program" with an emphasis on air quality, surface cleanliness, and food safety. The program includes removal of all in-flight disposable materials after flights, sterilization and fumigation of all cabin equipment, and inspection of the air-circulation system. A special audit process is also carried out for the cleaning and sanitization of aircraft systems by a team of specialists. These measures are applied to the entire Thai fleet.

Thai was the first airline to install hospital-grade air-filter True HEPA, capable of intercepting up to 99.99 per cent of dust particles and microorganisms on every flight. The World Health Organization awarded the airline a plaque for the implementation of its in-cabin management system in 2004. It was the first award of its kind to be presented to a private organization.

== Services ==
=== Cabins ===
Thai Airways offers four classes of service: Royal First Class, Royal Silk Class, Premium Economy, and Economy. On 29 April 2025, Thai Airways announced a cabin retrofit program for its Boeing 777-300ER aircraft (excluding those equipped with Royal First Class) and older Airbus A350-900s. The program includes new Royal Silk and Economy Class seats, as well as the installation of the Economy Plus Class.

==== Royal First Class ====
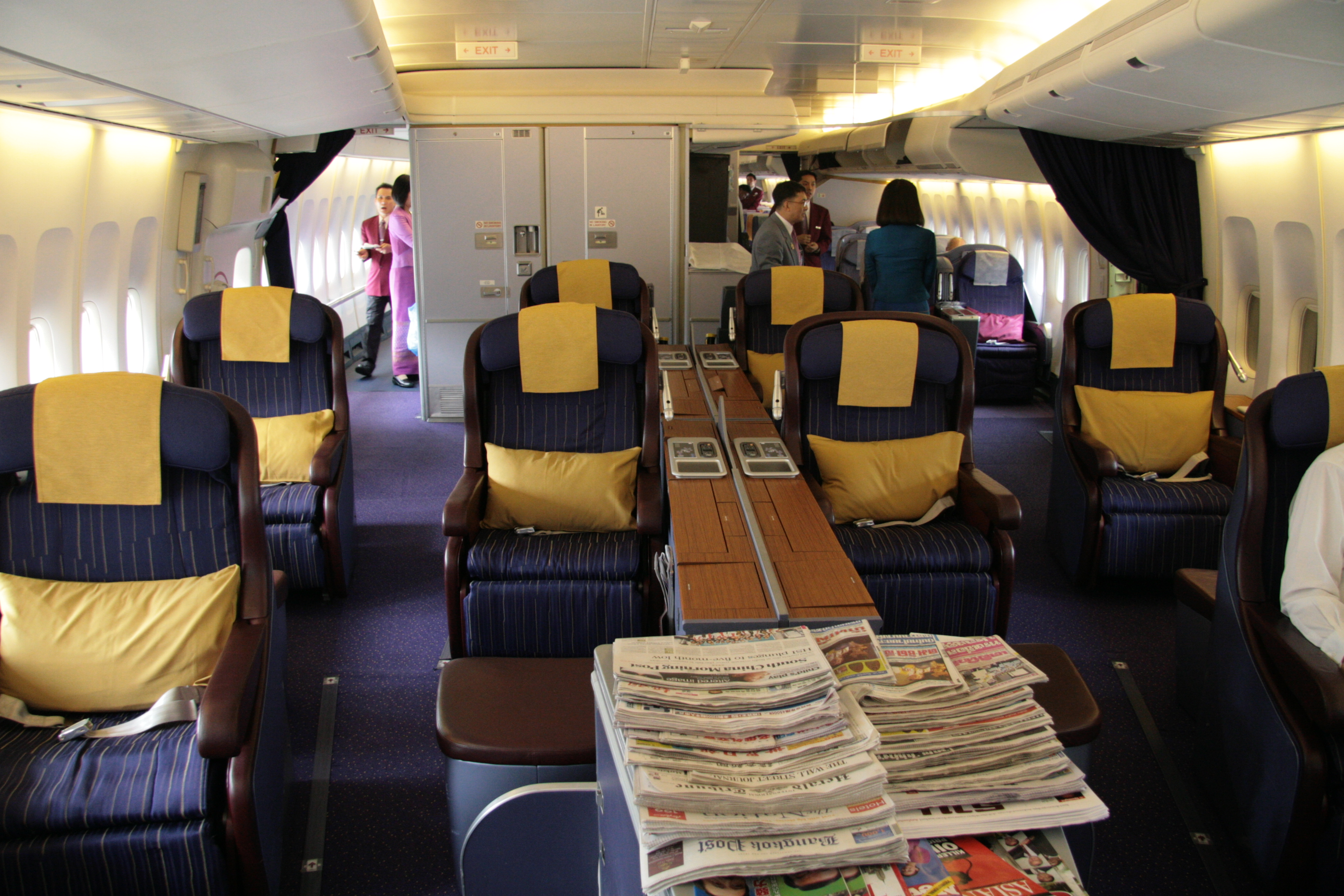
Royal First Class on a 747-400

Royal First Class seats on Thai Airways are exclusively available on three Boeing 777-300ER aircraft operating routes to London, Tokyo, and Osaka. Each seat is 24 inches wide and 7 feet long, equipped with a fully flat bed to maximize comfort and privacy. The seats are arranged in a 1-2-1 configuration across the first two rows of the aircraft.

However, Thai Airways plans to discontinue Royal First Class within two or three years from 2025 as part of a strategic plan to improve the travel experience and a restructuring plan to reduce the cabin configuration to three classes: Royal Silk Class, Premium Economy, and Economy Class.

==== Royal Silk Class ====
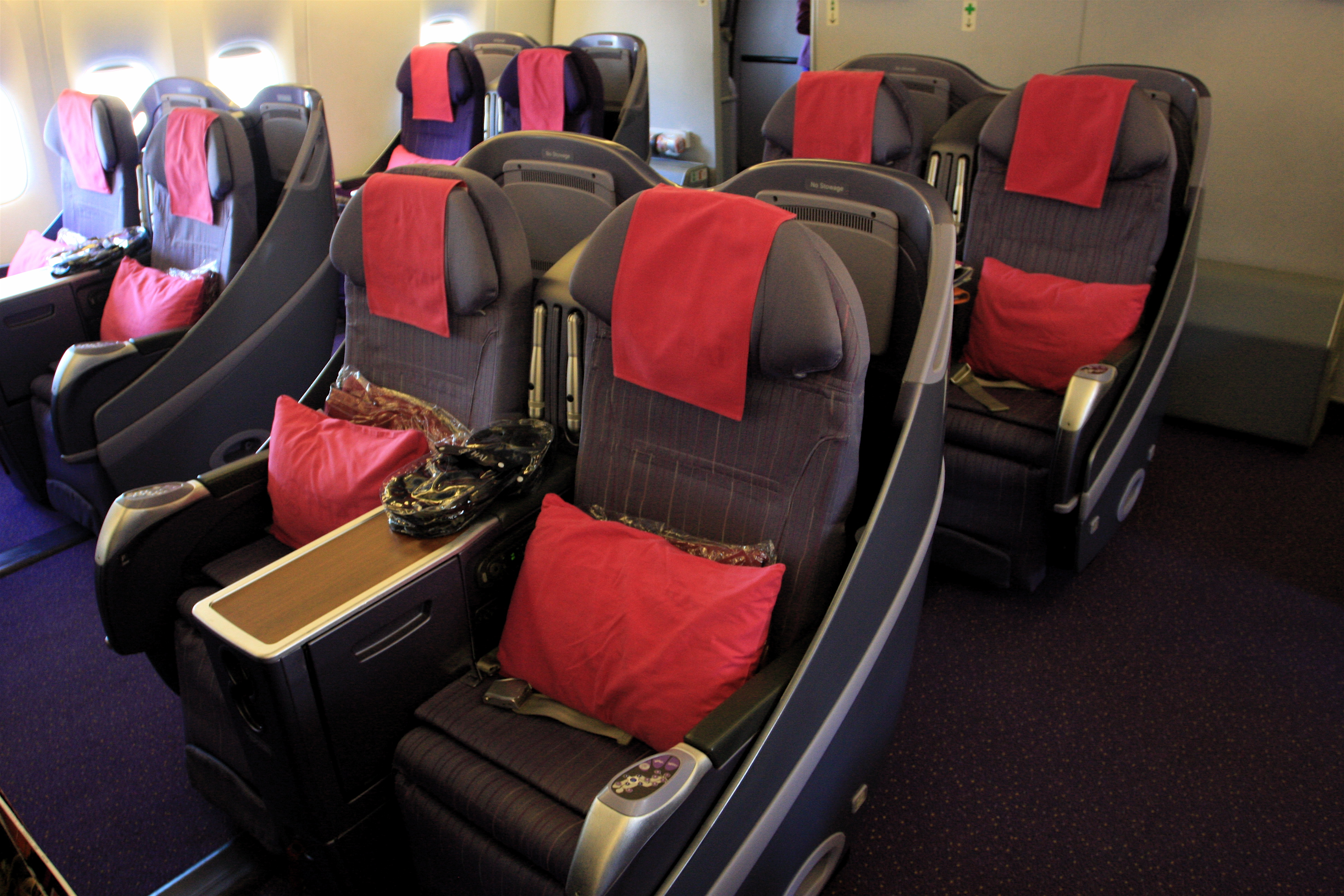
Royal Silk Class seats on Boeing 777-200ER

Thai Airways offers Royal Silk Class on every aircraft in its fleet, typically in a 1-2-1 configuration. Exceptions include six Boeing 787-8s with a 2-2-2 layout, two Airbus A350-900s with a 2-2-2 layout, two Airbus A330-300s with a 1-1-1 configuration, and Airbus A320-200s with a 2-2 arrangement. All Royal Silk Class seats are fully lie-flat beds, except those on the Airbus A320-200 and Boeing 777-200ER. Most aircraft feature a white and dark purple seat color scheme, with the exception of the Boeing 777-200ER, which uses a purple-white-ruby palette.

With Thai Airways planning to discontinue Royal First Class, the airline will retrofit Royal Silk Class on its Airbus A350-900 and Boeing 777-300ER aircraft, with the first row equipped with more spacious seats, informally called "Business Plus", while the other Royal Silk Class seats will have privacy doors installed. This new product will also be installed on the new Boeing 787-9, which is scheduled for delivery by 2028.

==== Premium Economy ====
The class was first introduced on the Airbus A340-500 in 2005 and remained in service until the aircraft was retired in 2012. Thai Airways reintroduced the class in 2024 with the entry into service of two ex-Virgin Atlantic Airbus A330-300s. The class features a 2-3-2 configuration and is designated as the 33C type. In 2025, Thai Airways announced that the new Boeing 787-10 will feature Premium Economy Class, along with the soon-to-be retrofitted Airbus A350-900 and Boeing 777-300ER, both of which will also be equipped with Premium Economy cabins.

==== Economy Class ====
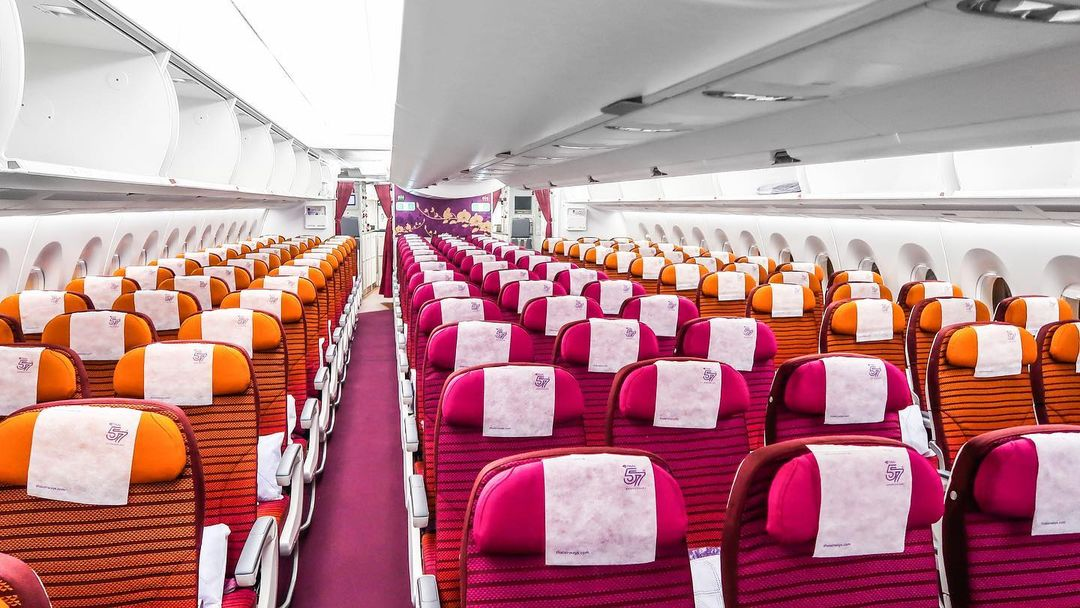
Thai Airways economy Class on Airbus A350-900

All wide-body aircraft in the Thai Airways fleet feature a 3-3-3 configuration in Economy Class, while narrow-body aircraft use a 3-3 configuration. The seats are typically upholstered in an orange and magenta color scheme.

=== Lounges ===
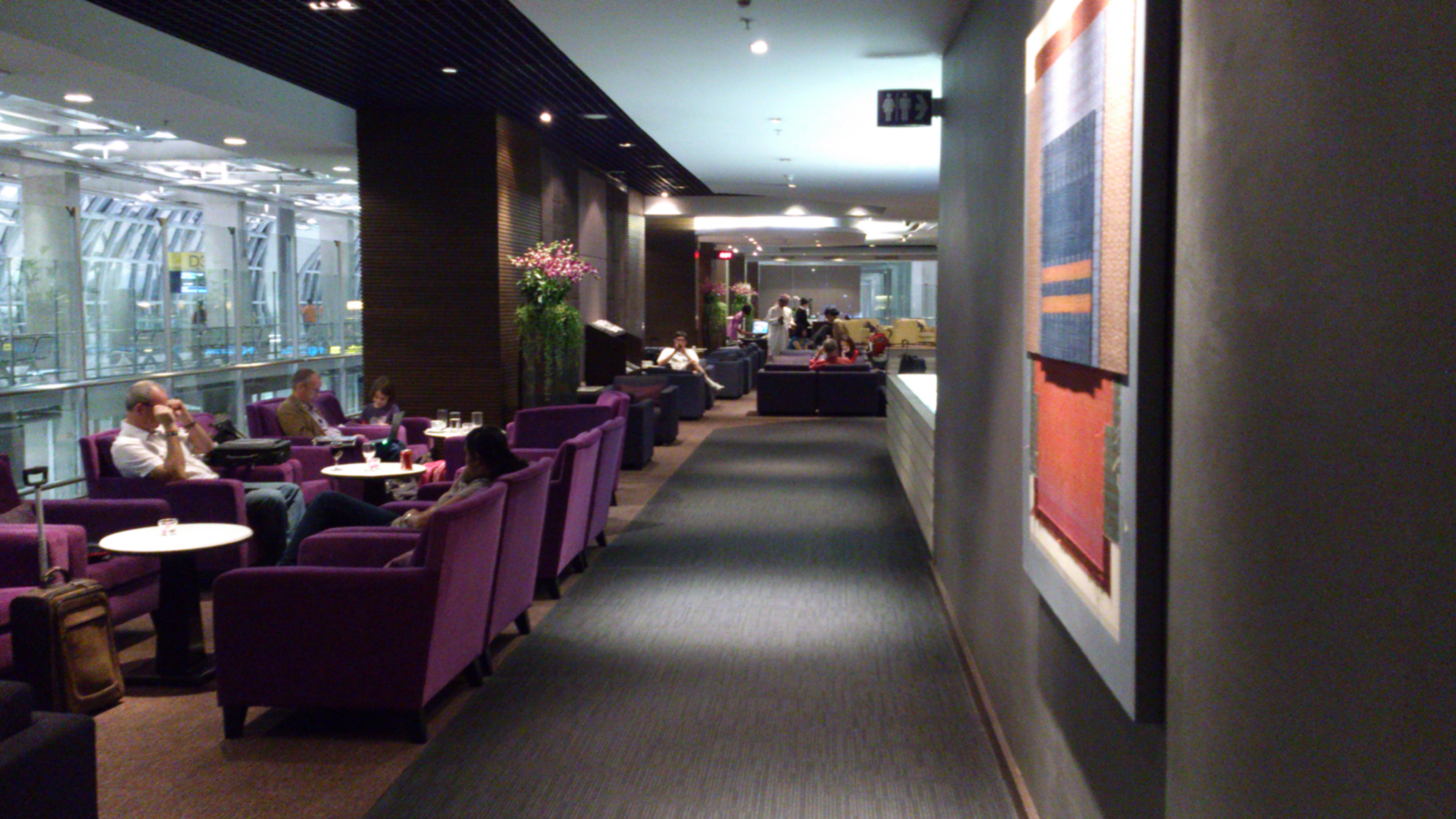
Royal Silk Lounge at Suvarnabhumi Airport, Concourse D

Thai Airways operates lounges for both domestic and international passengers under two main brands: Royal Orchid Lounge and Royal Silk Lounge. The lounges are located at the following airports:

==== Domestic Lounges ====
- Suvarnabhumi Airport
- Chiang Mai International Airport
- Phuket International Airport

==== International ====
- Suvarnabhumi Airport
- Chiang Mai International Airport
- Phuket International Airport
- Hazrat Shahjalal International Airport
- Hong Kong International Airport
- Tribhuvan International Airport
- Kuala Lumpur International Airport
- Ninoy Aquino International Airport
- Singapore Changi Airport

=== In-flight Cuisine ===
Thai Airways offers a variety of meals, including both Thai and international cuisine, depending on the destination and month. Pre-selected meals are available to all passengers up to 72 hours before departure.

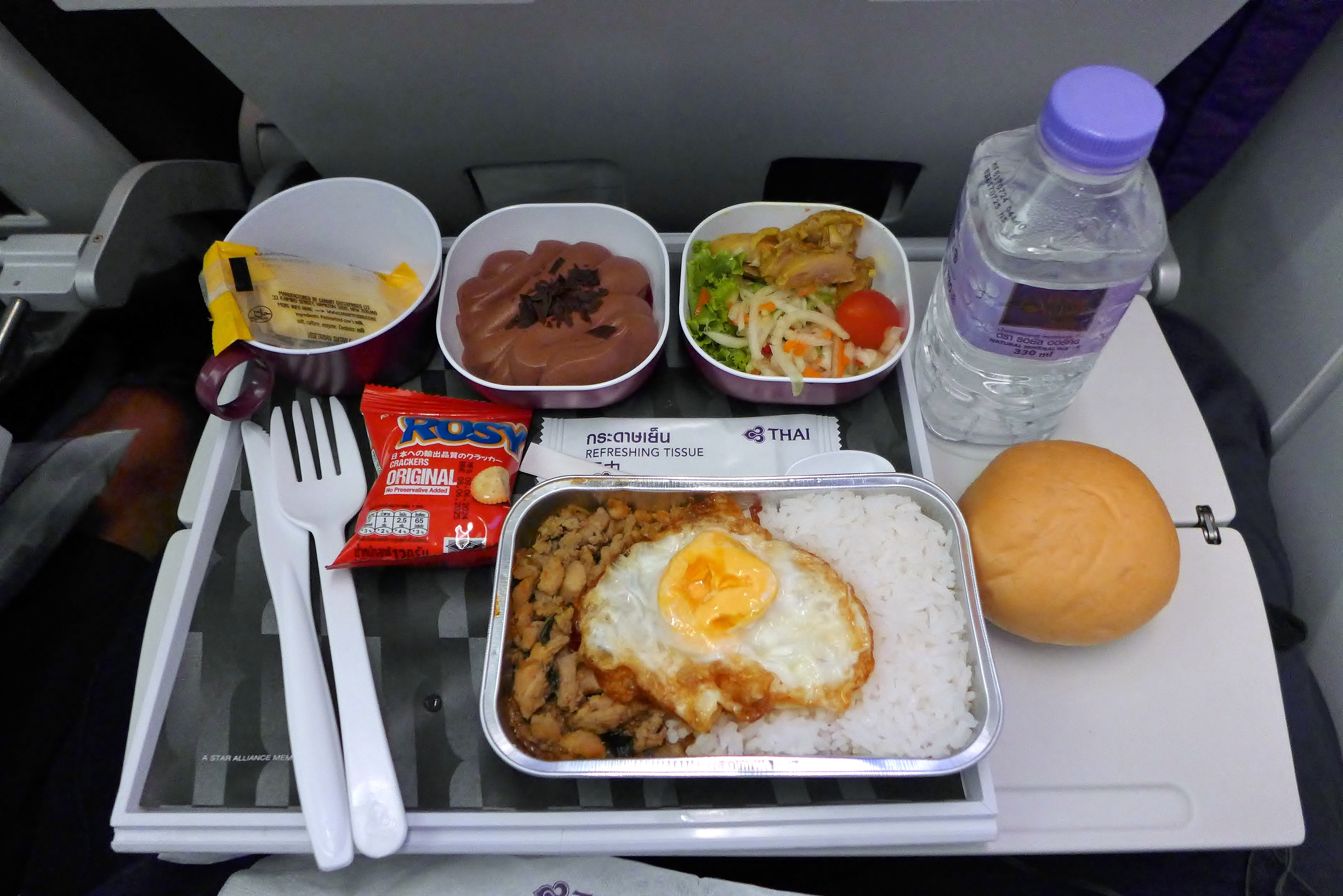
Economy Class meal

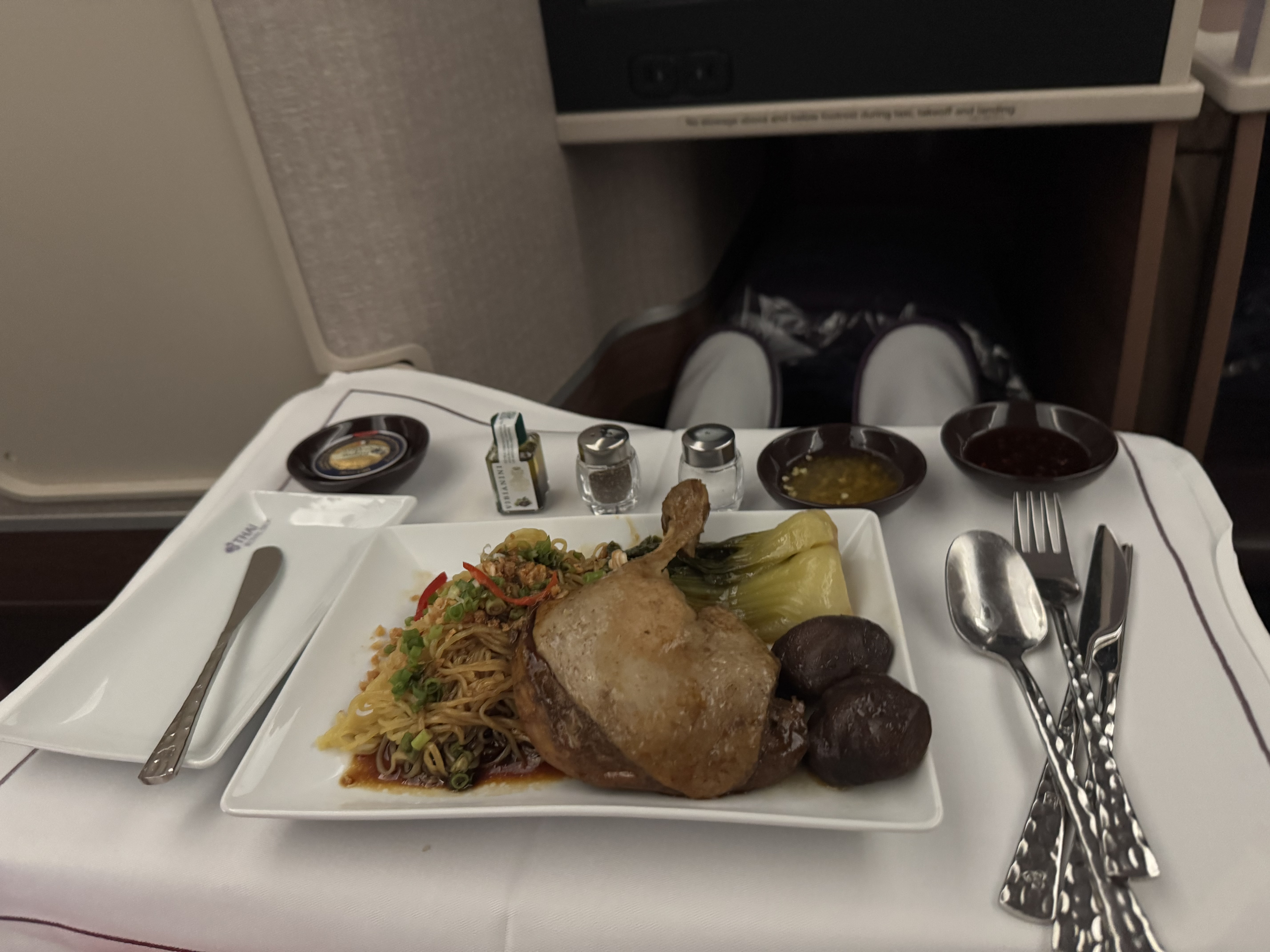
Business Class meal

== Royal Orchid Plus ==
Royal Orchid Plus is Thai's frequent flyer program. It has a membership of over two million people. There are two types of miles which can be accrued with a Royal Orchid Plus account: Eligible Qualifying Miles (EQM) on flights of THAI and its subsidiaries and codeshare and Star Alliance partners as well as Qualifying Miles (Q Miles) are the miles flown as well as the bonus miles earned from travel in particular classes of service on THAI and Star Alliance airlines. Royal Orchid Plus miles are earned based on the paid class of travel. There are four tiers in the Royal Orchid Plus program: Member, Silver, Gold and Platinum, depending on the Q Miles earned in one calendar year.

== Sponsorship ==
Thai Airways signed a sponsorship agreement with English Football League (EFL). The new agreement will see Thai Airways have a digital and in-stadia presence at every one of the five EFL Finals that are held at Wembley Stadium throughout the 2017/18. As of 2020, Thai has been given a year extension on the partnership.

In 2019, Thai Airways signed a sponsorship agreement with Australian Rugby Team Melbourne Rebels and the Australian A-League soccer club Western Sydney Wanderers for the 2018/19 season.

== Accidents and incidents ==
- 30 June 1967: Thai Airways International Flight 601, a Sud Aviation SE-210 Caravelle III (registered as HS-TGI, named Chiraprapa), crashed in the sea while landing at Kai Tak Airport during a typhoon, killing 24 of 80 on board.
- 9 July 1969: A Sud Aviation Caravelle III (registered as HS-TGK, named Thepamart) landed hard at Don Mueang International Airport during a thunderstorm; all 75 on board survived, but the aircraft was written off. The aircraft may have been caught by a downdraft.
- 10 May 1973: Thai Airways International Flight 311 A Douglas DC-8-33 (registered as HS-TGU, named Srisubhan) from Netaji Subhas Chandra Bose International Airport to Tribhuvan International Airport overran the runway on landing at Tribhuvan International Airport in Kathmandu. All 100 passengers and 10 crew on board survived, but one person on the ground died. 19 years later, a flight with the same flight number crashed, using an A310.
- 26 October 1986: Thai Airways International Flight 620, an Airbus A300B4-600 (registered as HS-TAE, named Sukhothai) landed safely at Itami Airport in Osaka, Japan after a grenade exploded on board at 33,000 feet (10,000 m) over Tosa Bay; all 239 passengers and crew on board survived. The aircraft was damaged by the explosion but was repaired and returned to service.
- 27 June 1989: Thai Airways International Flight 915 London Heathrow Airport to Bangkok Don Mueang International Airport (registered HS-TGB, named Sirisobhakya) with 374 Passenger a Boeing 747-200 During the Thai aircraft's attempt to pass, the outer 4 feet of its wingtip collided with the right elevator of British Airways Flight 392 Boeing 757-236 (registered G-BMRH Nalanji Dreaming) London Heathrow Airport to Brussels Airport
- 10 November 1990: Thai Airways International Flight 305, an Airbus A300B4 flying from Yangon to Bangkok was hijacked by four Burmese students demanding to be taken to India. The aircraft diverted to Calcutta where the hijackers surrendered after negotiations. The hijackers demanded restoration of democracy in Burma.
- 31 July 1992: Thai Airways International Flight 311, an Airbus A310-300 (registered as HS-TID, named Buri Ram) hit the side of a mountain 37 kilometres (23 mi) north of Kathmandu while descending toward Tribhuvan International Airport. All 113 on board (99 passengers and 14 crew) died. The accident was caused by pilot error and loss of situation awareness in inclement weather.
- 22 October 1994: An Airbus A300B4-100 (registered HS-THO, named Srichulalak) was written off after it was struck by an out-of-control Thai Airways MD-11 (registered as HS-TMD, named Phra Nakhon) that was performing an engine run-up at Bangkok International Airport.
- 11 December 1998: Thai Airways International Flight 261, an A310-200 (registered as HS-TIA, named Phitsanulok), bound for Surat Thani from Bangkok, crashed into a rice paddy about 3 km (2 mi) from Surat Thani International Airport during its third landing attempt in heavy rain; 101 of 146 on board died.
- 3 March 2001: Thai Airways International Flight 114, a Boeing 737-400 (registered as HS-TDC, named Narathiwat), bound for Chiang Mai from Bangkok, was destroyed by an explosion of the center wing tank resulting from ignition of the flammable fuel-air mixture in the tank while the aircraft was parked at the gate in Bangkok. The source of the ignition energy for the explosion could not be determined with certainty, but the most likely source was an explosion originating at the center wing tank pump as a result of running the pump in the presence of metal shavings and a fuel-air mixture. One crew member died.
- 8 August 2004: Thai Airways International Flight 198 with 28 passengers, an ATR72-201 (registered as HS-TRA, named Lampang) arriving from Chiang Mai International Airport ,suffered a nose gear collapse during landing at Mae Hong Son Airport
- 19 April 2005 : Thai Airways International Flight 602 with 183 passengers an Airbus A330-322 (registered as HS-TEL name Thepamart), scheduled depart Bangkok Don Mueang International Airport to Hong Kong Airport and Singapore Airlines flight 068 Changi Airport to Bangkok Don Mueang International Airport Boeing 777-212ER (registered as 9V-SQK) at 19.50 hours (local time) The 777 was holding in a taxi way after landing, when its wingtip was damaged by a passing A330 which was taxiing for takeoff at the time. The 777´s aileron was damaged while the Thai aircraft lost its right wingtip + winglet.
- 15 July 2006 : Thai Airways International Flight 943, a Boeing 747-400 aircraft (registered as HS-TGY name Dararasmi), scheduled to depart Madrid-Barajas Airport to Rome Fiumicino Airport carrying 310 passengers, was taxiing on the runway at Madrid-Barajas Airport and collided with the rear of an Air France Embraer ERJ-135 (F-GOHC), detaching the T-tail of the Air France plane and damaging the 747's winglet.
- 8 September 2013: Thai Airways International Flight 679, an Airbus A330-300 (registered as HS-TEF, named Song Dao), arriving from Guangzhou Baiyun International Airport excursed from the runway from runway 19L while landing at Suvarnabhumi Airport, with extensive damage to the airplane and the runway and minor injuries to 14 occupants. Preliminary investigation determined the cause of the accident to be the right landing gear collapsing as a result of a damaged bogie. In the aftermath of the accident, Thai Airways had the logos of the aircraft painted over in black, prompting widespread criticism of attempted cover-up. An airline official initially said that the practice was part of the "crisis communication rule" recommended by Star Alliance. This was denied by the group, and Thai Airways later clarified that the "de-identifying" of aircraft was its own practice and not Star Alliance policy. The controversy prompted discussion over the appropriateness and effectiveness of the practice as a brand-protection policy. No one was seriously injured, but the aircraft was written off. The airframe has since been converted to a roadside attraction called Airways Land, featuring a cafe and event space, on Mittraphap Road in Sida District, Nakhon Ratchasima Province.
- 9 March 2020, Thai Airways International Flight 575, an Airbus A330-343 (registered as HS-TEU and named Chaiburi) bound to Bangkok–Suvarnabhumi and carrying 79 occupants, struck a parked Gulfstream G-IVSP business jet (M-YWAY) at Vientiane's Wattay International Airport in Laos.
- 10 June 2023, Thai Airways International Flight 683, an Airbus A330-300 (registered as HS-TEO, named Chutamat), which was to depart from Haneda Airport in Tokyo, Japan for Bangkok–Suvarnabhumi collided with EVA Air Flight 189, also an Airbus A330-300 (registered as B-16340), headed for Taipei–Songshan. No injuries were reported. However, both aircraft sustained minor damage as a result of the collision. The collision forced one of the four runways of Haneda to temporarily close for approximately two hours. The Japan Civil Aviation Bureau (JCAB) has launched an investigation involving both airlines.

== See also ==
- List of airlines of Thailand
- Transport in Thailand

== Bibliography ==
- Flying the silken way-40 years of Thai, Thai Airways, 2000
