= List of airports in Thailand =

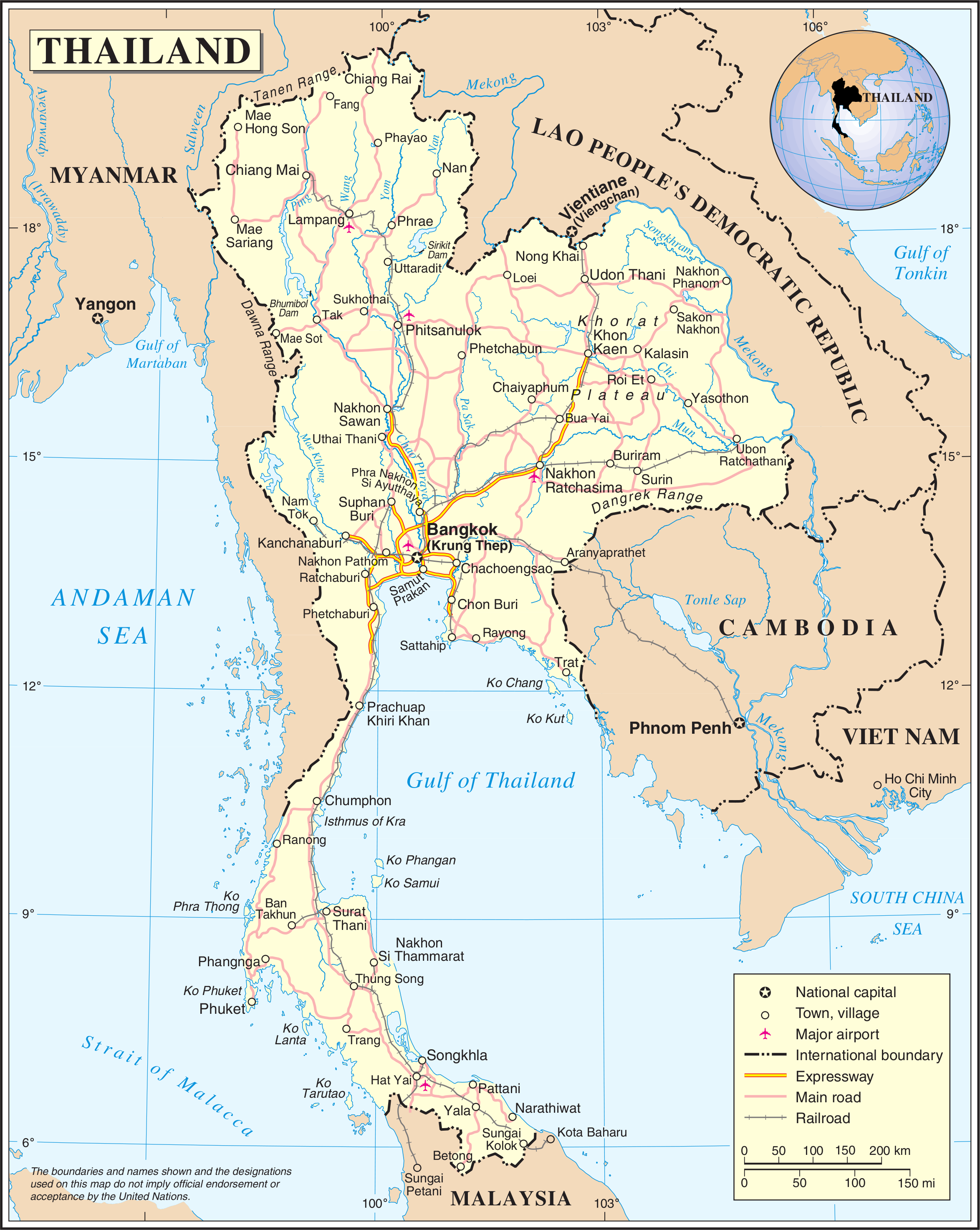
Map of Thailand

There are 39 commercial service airports in Thailand, 10 of which are international airports. The Department of Airports (DOA) manages 29 airports, while 6 airports are managed by Airports of Thailand (AOT), 3 airports are managed by Bangkok Airways (BA), and 1 airport is managed by the Royal Thai Navy (RTN). The six major international airports managed by AOT are the main gateways to Thailand for international travelers, while smaller commercial airports may be operated by the DOA or individual airlines. Thailand also has military and private airports that serve various purposes, such as supporting military operations, private aircraft operations, and general aviation.

== History ==
In 1974, about 227 airfields were reported in Thailand, including both active and former airfields of which 176 were usable. 47 of that number had permanent-surface runways, and 32 of which were used for civilian operations. The remaining usable airfields, 42 of which had with over 2,000 feet in length, while the other 87 had runways less than 2,000 feet in length. Airfields were evenly distributed across the country, and smaller airfields positioned along the borders of Thailand were used by the Border Patrol Police. In 1979, about 158 airfields were reported in Thailand, 150 of which were usable; 55 of that number had permanent-surfaced runways, including 30 with runways over 1,220 meters long and ten with runways over 2,440 meters long.

In 1990, about 127 airfields were reported in Thailand, 103 of which were usable. Of that number, 56 had permanent-surface runways, including one with runways measuring over 3,659 meters long, 26 measuring over 1,220 meters long, and 13 measuring over 2,440 meters long. In 2003, about 109 airfields were reported in Thailand. Of that number, 65 had a paved surface with six measuring less than 914 meters long, 19 measuring more than 914 meters long, 23 measuring more than 1,524 meters long, and 17 measuring more than 2,438 meters long. There was a total of 44 unpaved airfields, one had runways measuring more than 1,524 meters long, 15 measuring more than 914 meters long, and 28 measured less than 914 meters long.

== Classification of airports ==
=== Flight accommodation ===
Airports can be classified according to the types of flights they accommodate. There are two main categories:

1. International airports: Serve regular international flights and operate 24/7. Have ICAO-standard customs and immigration services, as well as ground facilities for handling passengers, cargo, and mail. Can be classified into two types based on their capacity:
  1. Primary international airports: Provide regular facilities and services for international flights.
  2. Secondary international airports: Provide limited facilities and services for international flights.
2. Domestic/National airports: Cater exclusively to domestic flights, without international flights.

=== CAAT classification ===
The Civil Aviation Authority of Thailand (CAAT) has classified Thailand airports into four categories based on their location in large cities and passenger traffic. The four categories are as follows:

1. Primary hub airports: These airports have a passenger traffic of over 25 million per year and are located in Bangkok. They are the main hubs of transport and connectivity in Thailand and offer a wide range of facilities and services for both domestic and international flights.
2. Secondary hub airports: These airports have a passenger traffic between 5 and 25 million per year and are located in popular tourist destinations. They offer a range of facilities and services for both domestic and international flights, but with fewer options than primary hub airports.
3. Regional airports: These airports have a passenger traffic between 1 and 5 million per year and are located in smaller cities or popular tourist destinations. They offer limited facilities and services for both domestic and international flights.
4. Local airports: These airports have a passenger traffic of less than 1 million per year and are located in small towns or remote areas. They offer very limited facilities and services for domestic flights only.

== List of airports ==
Airport name	City served	Location		IATA	ICAO	Classification		Operator	Coordinates
Airport name	City served	Province	District	IATA	ICAO	Flight accommodation	CAAT	Operator	Coordinates
International airports
Don Mueang International Airport	Bangkok Metropolitan Region	Bangkok	Don Mueang	DMK	VTBD	International	Primary	AOT	13°54′44.59″N 100°36′14.57″E
Suvarnabhumi Airport	Bangkok Metropolitan Region	Samut Prakan	Bang Phli	BKK	VTBS	International	Primary	AOT	13°41′32.71″N 100°45′1.79″E
Chiang Mai International Airport	Chiang Mai; Lamphun; Lampang	Chiang Mai	Mueang Chiang Mai	CNX	VTCC	International	Secondary	AOT	18°46′8.38″N 98°58′4.57″E
Mae Fah Luang – Chiang Rai International Airport	Chiang Rai	Chiang Rai	Mueang Chiang Rai	CEI	VTCT	International	Regional	AOT	19°57′15.43″N 99°52′44.92″E
Krabi International Airport	Krabi	Krabi	Nuea Khlong	KBV	VTSG	International	Regional	DOA	8°5′55.52″N 98°58′57.92″E
Phuket International Airport	Phuket	Phuket	Thalang	HKT	VTSP	International	Secondary	AOT	8°6′19.23″N 98°18′20.2″E
U-Tapao International Airport	Chonburi; Pattaya; Rayong	Rayong	Ban Chang	UTP	VTBU	International	Local	RTNV	12°40′47″N 101°0′18″E
Hat Yai International Airport	Hat Yai	Songkhla	Khlong Hoi Khong	HDY	VTSS	International	Regional	AOT	6°56′11.3″N 100°23′37.4″E
Samui International Airport	Koh Samui	Surat Thani	Koh Samui	USM	VTSM	International	Regional	BA	9°32′52″N 100°3′44″E
Surat Thani International Airport	Surat Thani	Surat Thani	Phunphin	URT	VTSB	International	Regional	DOA	9°8′3.75″N 99°8′32.94″E
Udon Thani International Airport	Udon Thani	Udon Thani	Mueang Udon Thani	UTH	VTUD	International	Regional	DOA	17°23′12.79″N 102°46′32.63″E
Domestic airports
Betong Airport	Betong; Yala	Yala	Betong	BTZ	VTSY	Domestic	Local	DOA	5°47′11.31″N 101°8′50.24″E
Buriram Airport	Buriram; Surin	Buriram	Satuek	BFV	VTUO	Domestic	Local	DOA	15°13′40.43″N 103°14′55.08″E
Chumphon Airport	Chumphon	Chumphon	Pathio	CJM	VTSE	Domestic	Local	DOA	10°42′52.17″N 99°21′32.19″E
Hua Hin Airport	Hua Hin	Prachuap Khiri Khan	Hua Hin	HHQ	VTPH	Domestic	Local	DOA	12°37′41.59″N 99°57′9.94″E
Khon Kaen Airport	Khon Kaen	Khon Kaen	Mueang Khon Kaen	KKC	VTUK	Domestic	Regional	DOA	16°27′51.95″N 102°47′11.78″E
Lampang Airport	Lampang	Lampang	Mueang Lampang	LPT	VTCL	Domestic	Local	DOA	18°16′39.25″N 99°30′20.2″E
Loei Airport	Loei	Loei	Mueang Loei	LOE	VTUL	Domestic	Local	DOA	17°26′44.6″N 101°43′35.45″E
Mae Hong Son Airport	Mae Hong Son	Mae Hong Son	Mueang Mae Hong Son	HGN	VTCH	Domestic	Local	DOA	19°18′1.92″N 97°58′30.69″E
Mae Sariang Airport	Mae Sariang	Mae Hong Son	Mae Sariang	–	VTCS	Domestic	Local	DOA	18°10′40.47″N 97°55′49.86″E
Mae Sot Airport	Mae Sot; Tak	Tak	Mae Sot	MAQ	VTPM	Domestic	Local	DOA	16°42′8.83″N 98°32′44.16″E
Nakhon Phanom Airport	Nakhon Phanom	Nakhon Phanom	Mueang Nakhon Phanom	KOP	VTUW	Domestic	Local	DOA	17°23′11.63″N 104°39′37.82″E
Nakhon Ratchasima Airport	Nakhon Ratchasima	Nakhon Ratchasima	Chaloem Phra Kiat	NAK	VTUQ	Domestic	Local	DOA	14°57′13.3″N 102°18′41.33″E
Nakhon Si Thammarat Airport	Nakhon Si Thammarat	Nakhon Si Thammarat	Mueang Nakhon Si Thammarat	NST	VTSF	Domestic	Local	DOA	8°32′23.8″N 99°56′25.11″E
Nan Nakhon Airport	Nan	Nan	Mueang Nan	NNT	VTCN	Domestic	Local	DOA	18°48′9.8″N 100°47′5.32″E
Narathiwat Airport	Narathiwat	Narathiwat	Mueang Narathiwat	NAW	VTSC	Domestic	Local	DOA	6°31′22.99″N 101°44′55.17″E
Pai Airport	Pai	Mae Hong Son	Pai	PYY	VTCI	Domestic	Local	DOA	19°22′13.55″N 98°26′9.41″E
Pattani Airport	Pattani	Pattani	Nong Chik	PAN	VTSK	Domestic	Local	DOA	6°47′6.16″N 101°8′51.53″E
Phetchabun Airport	Phetchabun	Phetchabun	Lom Sak	PHY	VTPB	Domestic	Local	DOA	16°40′33.36″N 101°11′26.16″E
Phitsanulok Airport	Phitsanulok	Phitsanulok	Mueang Phitsanulok	PHS	VTPP	Domestic	Local	DOA	16°46′17.97″N 100°16′53.86″E
Phrae Airport	Phrae	Phrae	Mueang Phrae	PRH	VTCP	Domestic	Local	DOA	18°7′54.2″N 100°9′44.47″E
Ranong Airport	Ranong	Ranong	Mueang Ranong	UNN	VTSR	Domestic	Local	DOA	9°46′25.74″N 98°35′14.3″E
Roi Et Airport	Roi Et	Roi Et	Thawat Buri	ROI	VTUV	Domestic	Local	DOA	16°6′33.84″N 103°46′57.05″E
Sakon Nakhon Airport	Sakon Nakhon	Sakon Nakhon	Mueang Sakon Nakhon	SNO	VTUI	Domestic	Local	DOA	17°11′48.02″N 104°6′59.51″E
Sukhothai Airport	Sukhothai	Sukhothai	Sawankhalok	THS	VTPO	Domestic	Local	BA	17°13′56.88″N 99°49′13.66″E
Tak Airport	Tak	Tak	Mueang Tak	TKT	VTPT	Domestic	Local	DOA	16°53′53.48″N 99°15′13.5″E
Trang Airport	Trang	Trang	Mueang Trang	TST	VTST	Domestic	Local	DOA	7°30′40.75″N 99°36′55.14″E
Trat Airport	Trat	Trat	Khao Saming	TDX	VTBO	Domestic	Local	BA	12°16′51.95″N 102°19′27.74″E
Ubon Ratchathani Airport	Ubon Ratchathani	Ubon Ratchathani	Mueang Ubon Ratchathani	UBP	VTUU	Domestic	Regional	DOA	15°14′49.5″N 104°52′13.56″E

=== Other airports ===
This list includes airports other than the 39 airports listed above, without scheduled services, military airports, as well as airports and airstrips used solely for general aviation.

Airport name	Location		ICAO	IATA	Operator	Coordinates
Airport name	Province	District	ICAO	IATA	Operator	Coordinates
Bang Phra Airport	Chonburi	Si Racha	VTBT		Thai Flying Club	13°13′59.77″N 100°57′28.29″E
Ban Thi Airport	Lamphun	Ban Thi	VTCM			18°40′35.45″N 99°6′9.75″E
Bhumibol Dam Airport	Tak	Sam Ngao	VTPY		EGAT	17°14′0.87″N 99°3′24.9″E
Cha-ian Airport	Nakhon Si Thammarat	Pak Phun	VTSN		RTA	8°28′9.74″N 99°57′20.94″E
Chanthaburi Airstrip	Chanthaburi	Tha Mai	VTBC		RTNV	12°37′49.07″N 102°1′33.55″E
Chiang Kham Airport	Phayao	Chiang Kham	VTCB		RTA	19°29′59.28″N 100°17′2.97″E
Kabinburi Airport	Prachinburi	Kabinburi	VTZ3		Sahapat	14°1′11.62″N 101°42′8.37″E
Kamphaeng Saen Airport	Nakhon Pathom	Kamphaeng Saen	VTBK	KDT	RTAF	14°5′50.2″N 99°55′16.91″E
Khok Kathiam Air Force Base	Lopburi	Mueang Lopburi	VTBL	KKM	RTAF	14°52′29″N 100°39′47″E
Korat Royal Thai Air Force Base	Nakhon Ratchasima	Nakhon Ratchasima	VTUN		RTAF	14°55′51.5″N 102°4′34.48″E
Koh Mai Si Airport	Trat	Ko Mai Si		ZZA	Soneva Kiri	11°43′2.84″N 102°31′13.64″E
Koh Takian Airport	Trat	Mueang Trat	VTBV		RTAF	12°15′15.29″N 102°31′6.44″E
Lamphun Airport	Lamphun	Lamphun	VTCO		Sahaphat	18°32′50.16″N 99°0′43.78″E
Loeng Nok Tha Airport	Yasothon	Loeng Nok Tha				16°9′21.9″N 104°35′22.9″E
Lom Sak Airport	Phetchabun	Lom Sak				16°49′26.92″N 101°15′4.85″E
Nakhon Sawan Airport	Nakhon Sawan	Mueang Nakhon Sawan	VTPN		DRRAA	15°40′19.13″N 100°8′7.67″E
Namphong Airstrip	Khon Kaen	Nam Phong			RTAF	16°39′6″N 102°57′56″E
Nok Airfield	Chiang Mai	Ban Thi	VTCY		Nok Aviation Flying Club (Note: Not related to Nok Air or Nok Mini.)	18°40′36.13″N 99°6′41.36″E
Nong Khor Airfield	Chonburi	Si Racha			Paramotor Thailand	13°8′24.16″N 101°2′45.89″E
Old Chiang Rai Airport	Chiang Rai	Mueang Chiang Rai	VTCR		RTAF	19°53′0.32″N 99°49′35.81″E
Pak Phreaw Airport	Saraburi	Mueang Saraburi	VTBE		RTA	14°30′48.38″N 100°55′4.65″E
Pattaya Airpark	Chonburi	Bang Lamung	VTBF			12°49′57.39″N 100°56′56.98″E
Photharam Airport	Ratchaburi	Photharam	VTPR		Thai Aerospace Services	13°40′12.61″N 99°44′2.13″E
Phuket Airpark	Phuket	Thalang	VTSW			8°1′11.08″N 98°24′5.39″E
Prachin Buri Airport	Prachin Buri	Mueang Prachin Buri	VTBI		RTA	14°4′39.95″N 101°22′47.59″E
Prachuap Khiri Khan Air Force Base	Prachuap Khiri Khan	Mueang Prachuap Khiri Khan	VTBP		RTAF	11°47′18.3″N 99°48′16.65″E
Rob Muang Airport	Roi Et	Mueang Roi Et	VTUR		RTA	16°4′13.26″N 103°38′45.25″E
Songkhla Airport	Songkhla	Mueang Songkhla	VTSH	SGZ	RTNV	7°11′11.4″N 100°36′29.08″E
Surin Airport	Surin	Mueang Surin	VTUJ	PXR	DOA	14°52′5.75″N 103°29′53.72″E
Takhli Air Force Base	Nakhon Sawan	Takhli	VTPI	TKH	RTAF	15°16′38.29″N 100°17′45.06″E
Uttaradit Airport	Uttaradit	Mueang Uttaradit	VTPU	UTR	DOA	17°40′25.01″N 100°14′4.98″E
Watthana Nakhon Airport	Sa Kaeo	Watthana Nakhon	VTBW		RTAF	13°46′7.68″N 102°18′55.77″E

=== Under construction, approved and proposed ===
This list includes airports that are currently under construction, as well as those that have been approved and are in the planning stages.

Airport name	Location	Classification		Operator	Coordinates	Start	Completion	Status
Airport name	Location	Flight accommodation	CAAT	Operator	Coordinates	Start	Completion	Status
U-Tapao International Airport; New Terminal; Phase 1	Rayong	International	Primary	UTA	12°40′43.34″N 101°1′15.03″E	2024	2027	Prepared for construction
Trang Airport; New Terminal	Trang	International	Regional	DOA	7°30′15.72″N 99°37′4.97″E	2020	2023	Under construction
Khon Kaen International Airport; New Terminal	Khon Kaen	International	Regional	DOA	16°27′51.95″N 102°47′11.78″E	2018	2023	Under construction
Buriram International Airport; New Terminal	Buriram	International	Regional	DOA	15°13′40.43″N 103°14′55.08″E	2021	2024	Under construction
Don Mueang International Airport; Expansion: Phase 3	Bangkok	International	Primary	AOT	13°54′22.83″N 100°35′43.82″E	2023	2029	Approved
Nakhon Pathom Airport	Nakhon Pathom	International	Regional	DOA				Proposed
Phang Nga - Andaman International Airport	Phang Nga	International	Regional	DOA				Proposed
New Chiang Mai International Airport	Chiang Mai	International	Secondary	AOT				Proposed
Bueng Kan Airport	Bueng Kan							Proposed
Mukdahan Airport	Mukdahan							Proposed
Satun Airport	Satun							Proposed
Mukdahan Airport	Mukdahan							Proposed
Phatthalung Airport	Phatthalung							Proposed
Phayao Airport	Phayao							Proposed
Kalasin Airport	Kalasin							Proposed

== Gallery ==
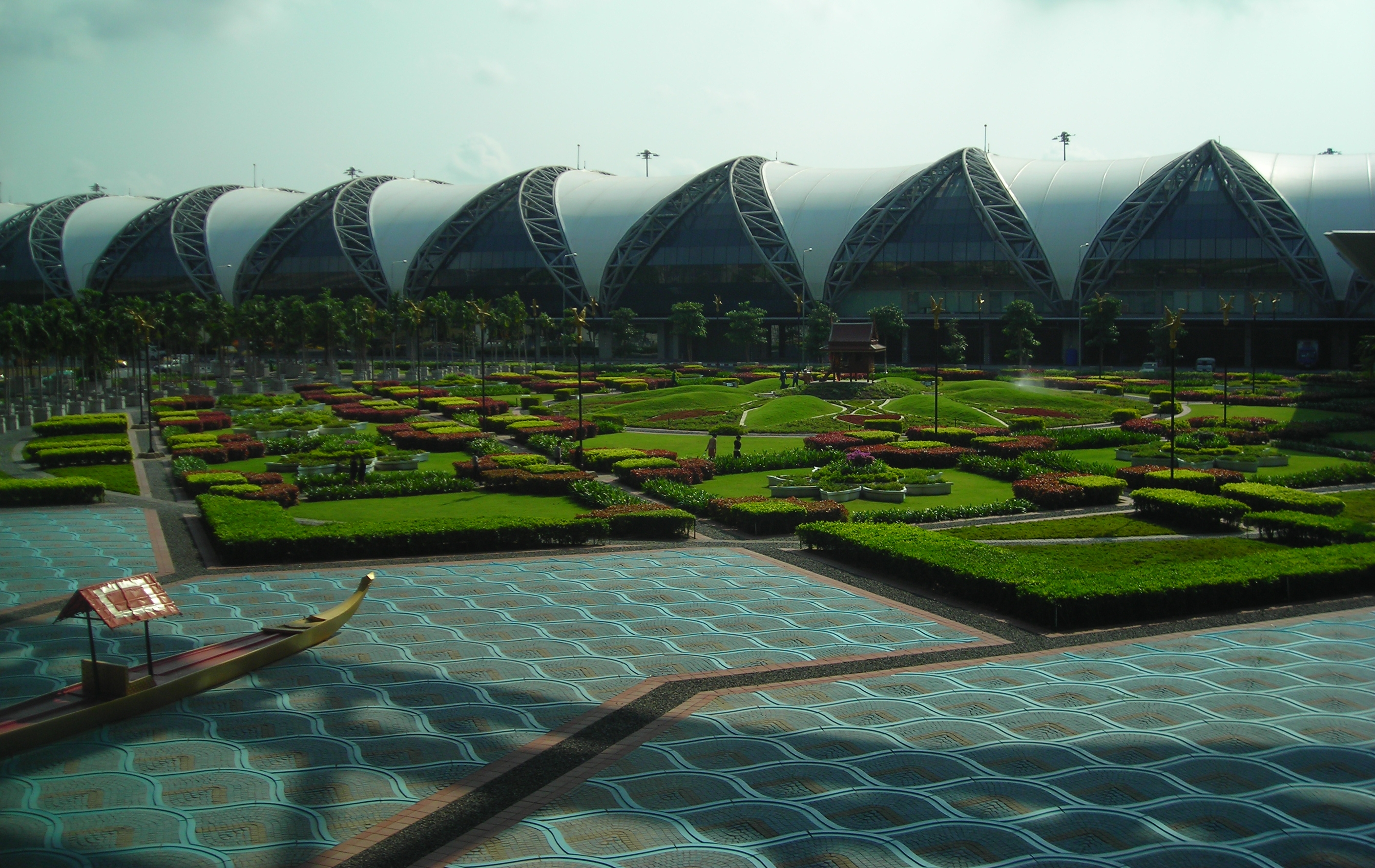
Suvarnabhumi International Airport

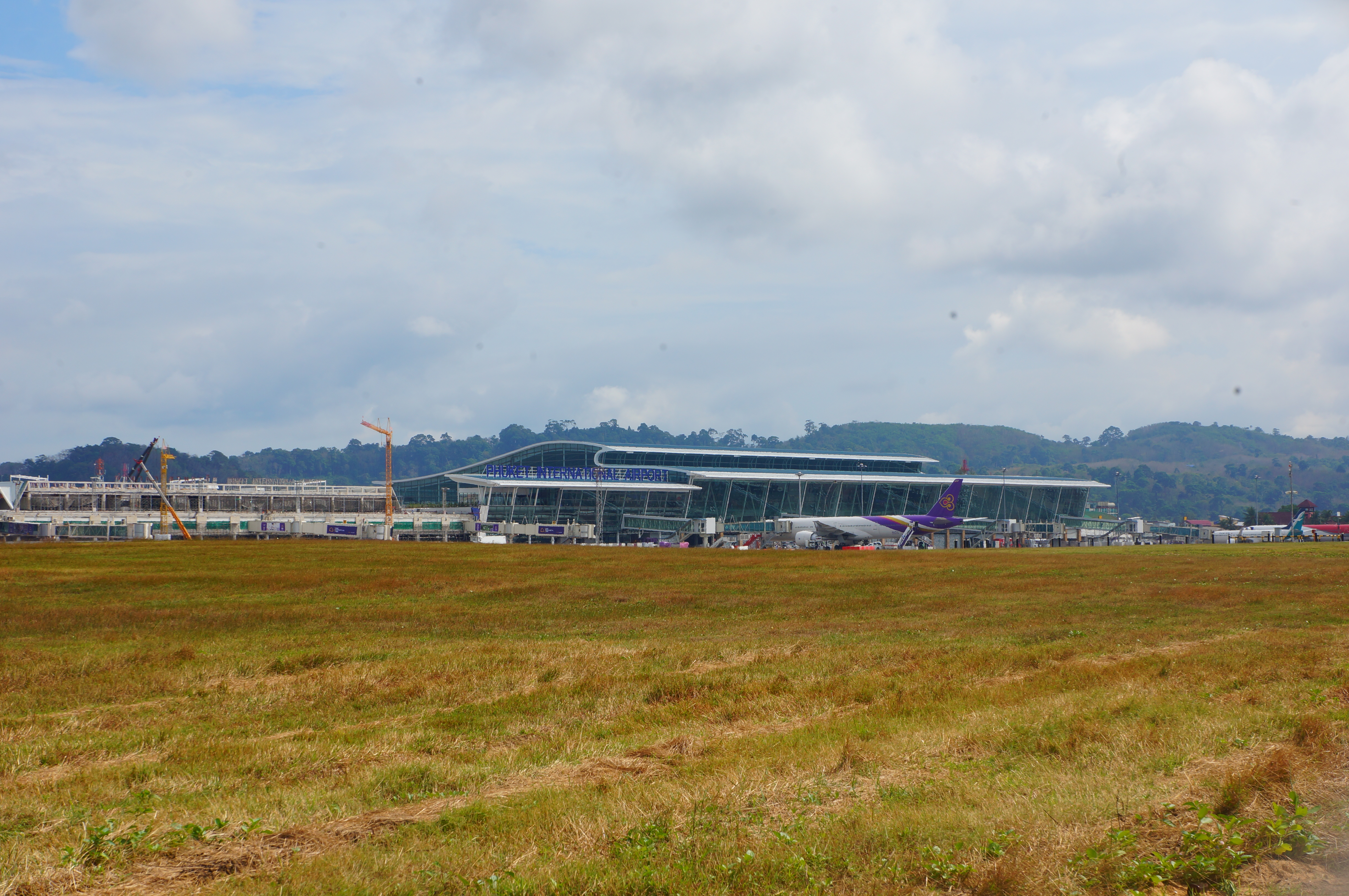
Phuket International Airport

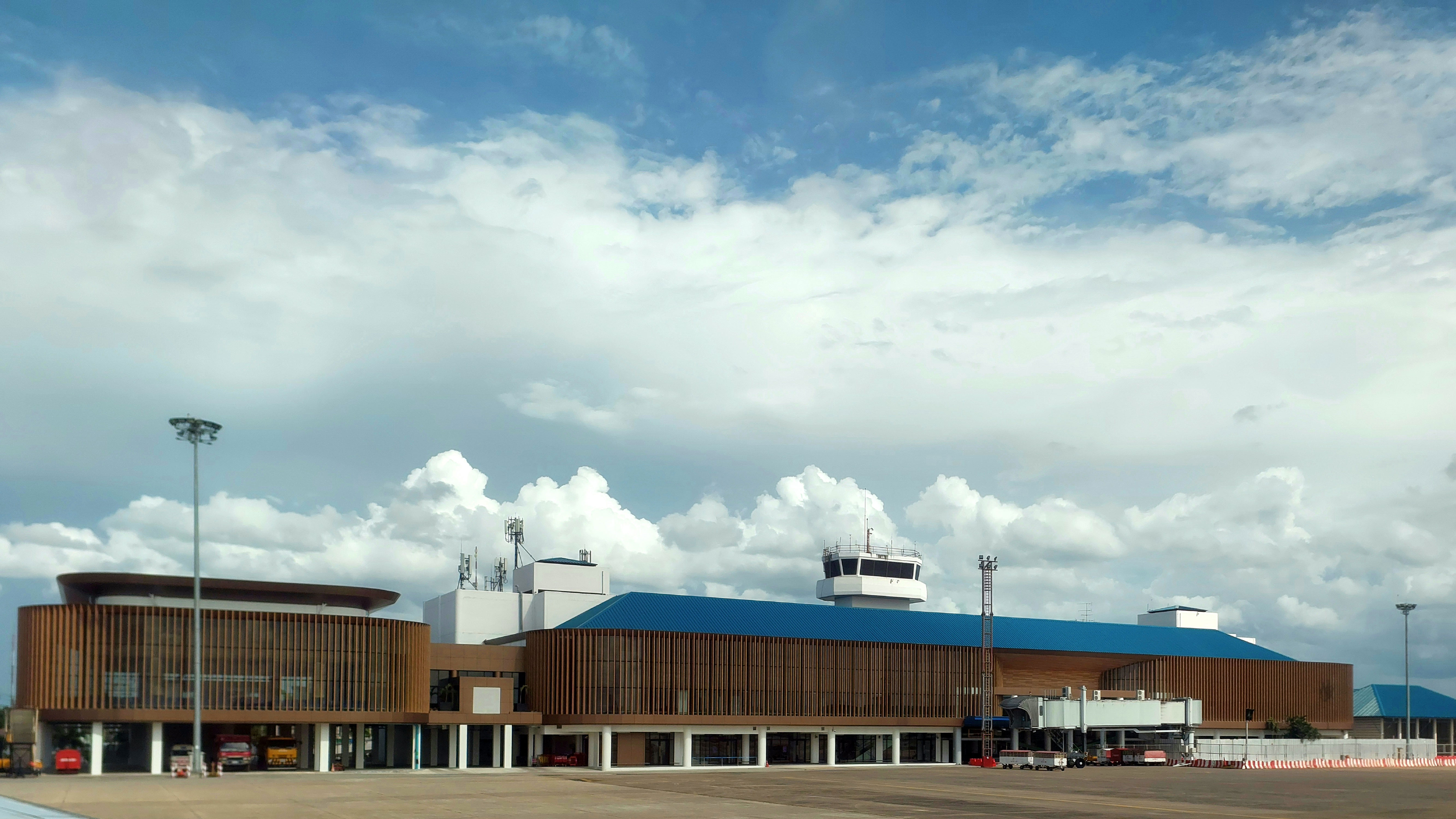
Surat Thani International Airport

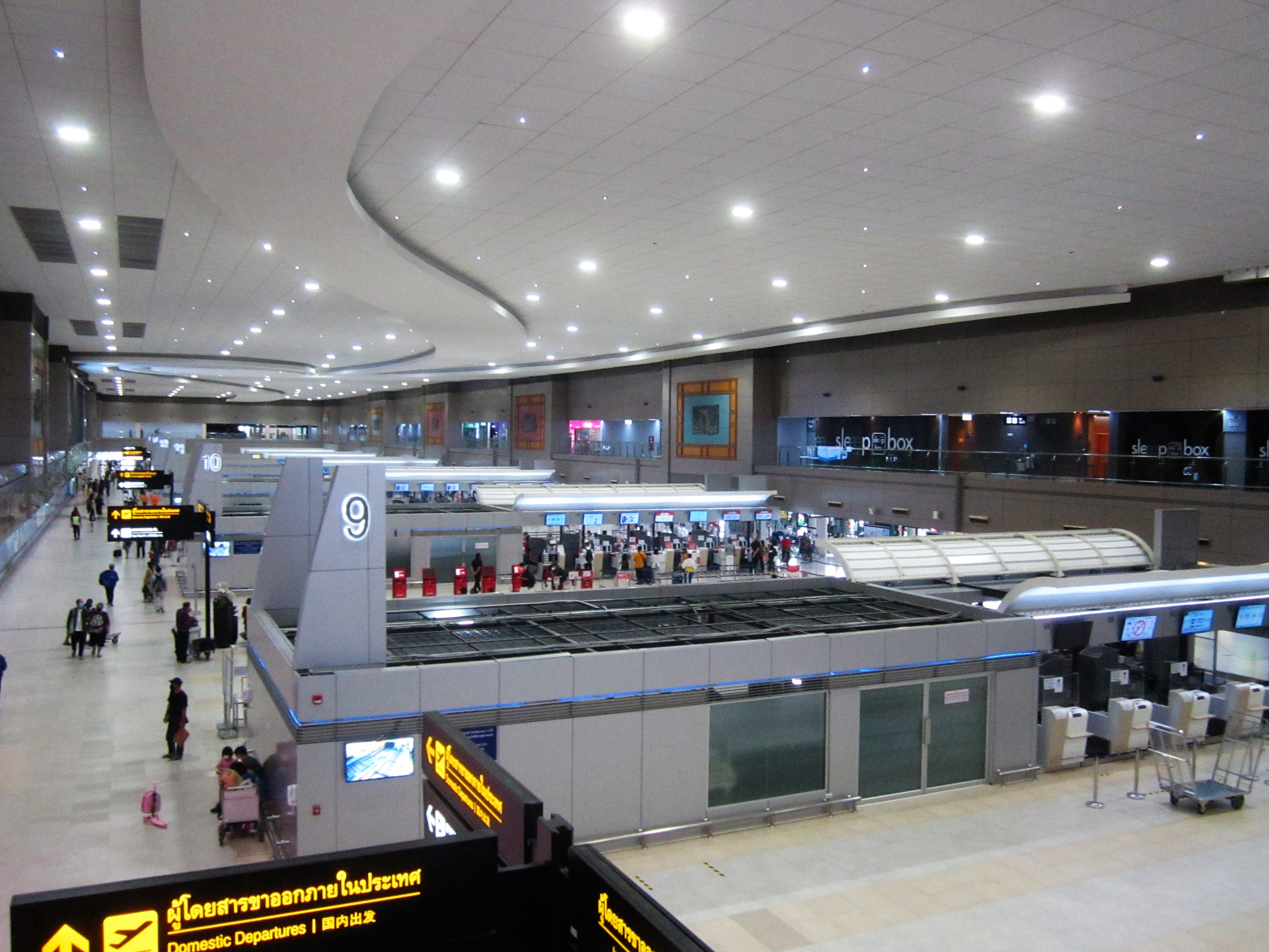
Don Mueang International Airport

== See also ==
- List of the busiest airports in Thailand
- List of airlines of Thailand
- Transport in Thailand
- List of airports by ICAO code: V#VT - Thailand
- Wikipedia:WikiProject Aviation/Airline destination lists: Asia#Thailand
