= Flight 266 =

Flight 266 may refer to:

- TWA Flight 266, crashed on 16 December 1960
- United Airlines Flight 266, crashed on 18 January 1969
- Bangkok Airways Flight 266, crashed on 4 August 2009
