= Flight 125 =

Flight 125 may refer to the following incidents involving commercial airliners:

Listed chronologically

- Pan Am Flight 125, experienced pressurization problems due to a cargo door issue on 10 March 1987
- Bangkok Airways Flight 125, crashed on 21 November 1990

== See also ==
- STS-125, a successful Space Shuttle mission in May 2009
