= Bangkok Airways Flight 125 =

1990 aviation accident in Thailand

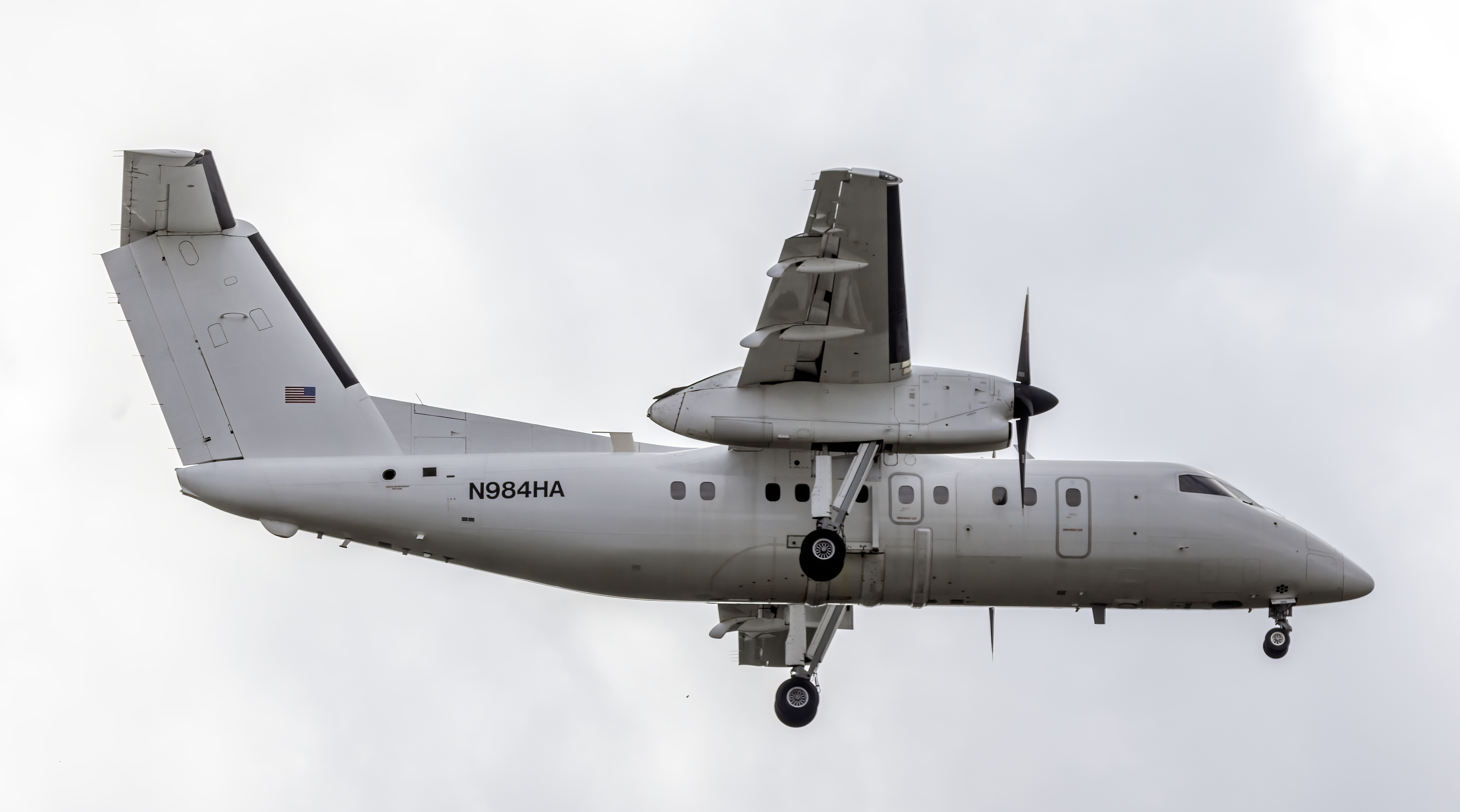
- A Dash 8-100 similar to the accident aircraft.

Accident
- Date: 21 November 1990
- Summary: Pilot error and spatial disorientation leading to loss of control
- Site: 5 km southwest of Samui Airport; 9.5169°N 100.03631°E

Aircraft
- Aircraft type: De Havilland Canada Dash 8-103
- Operator: Bangkok Airways
- IATA flight No.: PG125
- ICAO flight No.: BKP125
- Call sign: BANGKOK AIR 125
- Registration: HS-SKI
- Flight origin: Don Mueang International Airport, Bangkok, Thailand
- Destination: Samui Airport, Ko Samui, Thailand
- Occupants: 38
- Passengers: 33
- Crew: 5
- Fatalities: 38
- Survivors: 0

Bangkok Airways Flight 125 was a scheduled domestic passenger flight from Bangkok to Koh Samui, Thailand. On 21 November 1990, the de Havilland Canada Dash 8-100 operating the flight was on approach to Samui Airport in bad weather when the pilots decided to go around after not seeing the runway. With little to no visual reference, the pilots suffered spatial disorientation amidst a left turn, stalled, and crashed into a coconut and mango grove five kilometers southwest of the airport. All 33 passengers and five crew members were killed. Flight 125 is Bangkok Airways' first fatal accident.

The investigation, led by Thailand's Aircraft Accident Investigation Committee (AAIC), revealed that severe crew mismanagement and a breakdown in situational awareness led the pilots to become entirely fixated on looking outside to spot the runway in low visibility without monitoring the flight instruments. The AAIC noted that confusion in communication between the air traffic controller and the pilots over which direction to turn during the go around resulted in abrupt and severe control inputs that caused the aircraft to stall and dive.

== Background ==
=== Aircraft ===
The aircraft involved in the accident was a 37-seater de Havilland Canada Dash 8-100. Manufactured in September 1989 and registered as HS-SKI, it was delivered to Bangkok Airways that same month. Equipped with two Pratt & Whitney Canada PW120A turboprop engines, the aircraft had flown for a total of over 3,400 hours with just under 3,000 flight cycles.

=== Passengers and crew ===
People on board by nationality
Nationality	Passengers	Crew	Total
Thailand	3	5	8
Japan	5	0	5
Germany	5	0	5
Sweden	5	0	5
Australia	4	0	4
Italy	2	0	2
United States	2	0	2
Finland	1	0	1
Netherlands	1	0	1
Unknown (Note: Almost all sources list 28 nationals plus five crew. Five more passengers are unaccounted for in the tally.)	5	0	5
Total number of occupants	33	5	38

There were 33 passengers and five crew members on board the flight, including two flight attendants and three pilots: a flying officer, a group captain, and a first officer. Almost all of the passengers were foreign tourists headed to the island's beaches.

Although the airline had an established crew assignment for Flight 125, the flying officer decided to reorganize the cockpit roles to facilitate an impromptu training session for the group captain:

- The 54-year-old flying officer was the pilot monitoring. Originally assigned for Flight 125 as pilot-in-command, he took the role of an instructor and supervisor. He had over 14,700 total flight hours, with over 521 hours on the Dash 8.
- The 54-year-old group captain was the pilot in command of the flight for route training, despite being originally assigned as the observer pilot. He had a total of nearly 3,200 flight hours, with just 103 hours on the Dash 8. The group captain had not flown for "many consecutive years" prior to undergoing training in this new aircraft type. Learning new things was "very difficult for him at his age."
- The 38-year-old first officer was originally assigned to be the pilot monitoring, but had taken the observer's seat to account for the route training. He had a total flight time of 674 hours, with 235 hours on the Dash 8.

=== Weather conditions ===
Samui Airport was not equipped with a weather station, meaning there was no METAR data given to the pilots. Instead, meteorological information was relayed to the pilots of Flight 125 by the air traffic controllers based on their visual assessment. On the day of the flight, there were heavy rain showers scattered around the area south and southwest of the airport.

== Accident ==
=== Approach ===
At 4:58 PM, (Note: All times listed are in Indochina Time (UTC+7)) Flight 125 took off from Bangkok International Airport with 33 passengers and five crew members on board, bound for Koh Samui, Thailand, with an estimated arrival time of 6:13 PM. The group captain was the pilot flying, while the flying officer was acting as the pilot monitoring with additional duty of instructor.

At 5:45 PM, and approaching from the north, the flight established contact with the Samui Tower controller, and was given instructions to prepare for landing on runway 17, 120 nautical miles from Samui Airport. The tower controller also reported that the weather surrounding the airport was fair, despite the downpour of rain to the southwest.

As the aircraft neared the airport within 20 nautical miles, the controller reported the presence of drizzle surrounding the airport, reducing the visibility to six kilometers and shifting the wind direction to 030 degrees at 10 knots, prompting the controller to change the active runway from 17 to runway 35 on the opposite end. He then informed the pilots that the weather conditions east of the airport was good with heavy rain to the west.

A few minutes later, the tower controller observed that Flight 125's landing gear was extended as it flew perpendicular to the south of runway 35. However, as it reached the point where it should have made a right turn to line up with the runway, it instead continued straight ahead and flew into the area of heavy rain.

=== Crash ===
Having lost sight of the runway, the pilots decided to go around. The tower controller asked, "Will you make [a] left turn out?", during which the crew accidentally transmitted an ongoing cockpit conversation over the radio as one of the pilots said, "[A]gain going for max power, sir." The controller misheard the transmission as "I met problem," and asked, "Do you have any problem?", to which the pilot replied, "I can not see the runway. Left turn or right turn?".

Having lost all visual references, the plane was in an increasing left roll. The crew attempted to correct the bank angle, but it was deemed insufficient. At that time, there was confusion in the cockpit over which direction to turn: Bangkok Airways' missed approach procedure for runway 35 called for a right turn out to the open sea east of the airport. Yet the tower controller advised the crew: "There is a hill on the right hand side, make [a] left turn out."

Amidst the confusion and disorientation, the controller's request prompted the crew to abruptly turn the control wheel fully to the left while also applying left rudder for one second while the aircraft was already in a left bank, exacerbating the roll to 89 degrees. Seconds later, Flight 125 stalled, dived, and crashed into the ground in a 75-degree left bank and a 36-degree nose-down attitude at approximately 6:15 PM. All 33 passengers and five crew members were killed.

== Investigation ==
The crash of Flight 125 was led by Thailand's Aircraft Accident Investigation Committee, with assistance from Canada's Transportation Safety Board in retrieving data from the Cockpit Voice Recorder (CVR) and the Digital Flight Data Recorder (DFDR).

=== Cockpit dynamic ===
Throughout the course of the flight, the flying officer was training the group captain and monitoring his operation of the aircraft. The CVR revealed that the flying officer kept continually criticizing the group captain, which caused him stress and distraction. The flying officer became increasingly annoyed with the group captain's poor performance, ultimately taking control of the aircraft from him approximately two minutes before the crash.

As Flight 125 encountered the heavy rain, the flying officer started to focus on looking for the airport amidst the poor visibility, and told the other two pilots to help him find it. As a result, no one monitored the flight instruments or checked the aircraft's attitude. The controller's call for "Go make a left turn," as the aircraft went around, was interpreted by the pilots as a "half-instruction and half-question," leading to more confusion regarding the turn direction.

As the aircraft continued to roll to the left, the flying officer, likely disoriented and overwhelmed, transferred control back to the group captain, telling him "You, you fly, too." At that time, the group captain's attention was centered on locating the airport visually; and he wasn't aware of the aircraft's upset attitude. The flying officer reverting to the airline's right-turn missed approach procedure, while the controller urged a left turn to avoid the hills, led the group captain to suddenly over-bank his aircraft.

=== Final report ===
In its final report, the AAIC determined that the probable cause of the accident was that:

"The pilot experienced spatial disorientation, which resulted in improper control of the aircraft."

The factors contributing to the accident were:

"The pilot flew the aircraft into bad weather condition[s] which had very little or no visual reference. Channelized attention occurred when all of the pilots' concentration were focused on looking for the airport, and neglecting to do proper cross-checking or monitoring the aircraft attitude. Confusion of pilots, poor teamwork or poor cockpit co-ordination in monitoring the flight instruments might contribute to the loss of situational [awareness] and improper control of the aircraft through their false senses."

The AAIC recommended that the responsible persons should consider a pilot's past experience before assigning them as pilot-in-command. They advised that all crew members must be properly trained in crew resource management to improve cooperation, communication, and leadership, and that cockpit conversation should strictly adhere to standard practices.

== See also ==
- Bangkok Airways Flight 266: An ATR 72 that skidded off runway 35 of the same airport and hit an abandoned control tower nose-first, killing the captain. It was Bangkok Airways' second fatal accident.
