= Phang Nga airport =

Proposed airport in southern Thailand

- IATA: none; ICAO: none

Summary
- Airport type: Public
- Owner/Operator: Airports of Thailand (AOT)
- Serves: Phang Nga, Krabi and Phuket
- Location: Khok Kloi, Takua Thung, Phang Nga, Thailand

Phang Nga Airport (or the second Phuket airport) is a proposed international airport in Thailand, planned for construction in Khok Kloi subdistrict, Takua Thung district, Phang-nga province by the state-owned Airports of Thailand (AOT) company. The project was conceived to alleviate congestion at Phuket International Airport, and was first announced in 2018. It is scheduled to open in 2030.

== History ==
In 2016, Bangkok Airways proposed building a new airport in Phang-nga province, titled Phang Nga–Andaman International Airport, and discussed about to lease land for the airport with Thailand's Royal Forest Department, so that it will offset the increasing traffic and congestion at Phuket and Krabi airports, which are running in their constrained capacities, and will not be able to cope with the future traffic. It will also help to boost tourism, revenue, employment and foster economic development of Southern Thailand. The plan was met with much public opposition for its use of national forest land, and was abandoned as the Civil Aviation Authority of Thailand issued a 20-year master plan recommending Khok Kloi in the neighbouring Takua Thung district as a more suitable site instead.

In 2018, Airports of Thailand approved in principle for the fiscal years 2019–2023 plans to build a second airport for Phuket in Khok Kloi subdistrict (along with a second airport for Chiang Mai), with a budget of 60 billion baht (around US$1.9bn). Its president initially said that construction was expected to take place from 2019 to 2025. The local tourism industry welcomed the project, expecting it to help boost tourism in the "Andaman Triangle" of Krabi, Phang-nga, and Phuket.

In a 2019 presentation prepared for commerce minister Jurin Laksanawisit, the airport was planned to cover up to 7,300 rai (11.7 km^{2}; 2,900 acres) of land, with two 4,000-metre (13,000 ft) runways. The first phase, which would accommodate 22.5 million passengers per year, was set to cost 79.51812 billion baht ($2.5bn), with a second phase accommodating 25 million passengers per year costing 1.07107 billion baht ($30M). AOT expected that construction could finish by 2033 if the project went ahead.

In 2022, the preliminary feasibility study for the project was put on hold pending the transfer of Krabi International Airport from the Department of Airports to AOT, which would alter the AOT's regional development plans. In its roadmap for the airport handover, AOT listed two possibilities for the Phang-nga airport: it was expected to open by 2031 if the project went ahead, or it might be cancelled. Another feasibility study was signed in September 2024, and in October, the Thai government said the project was "progressing well".
