= Takua Thung district =

Takua Thung ตะกั่วทุ่ง
- District
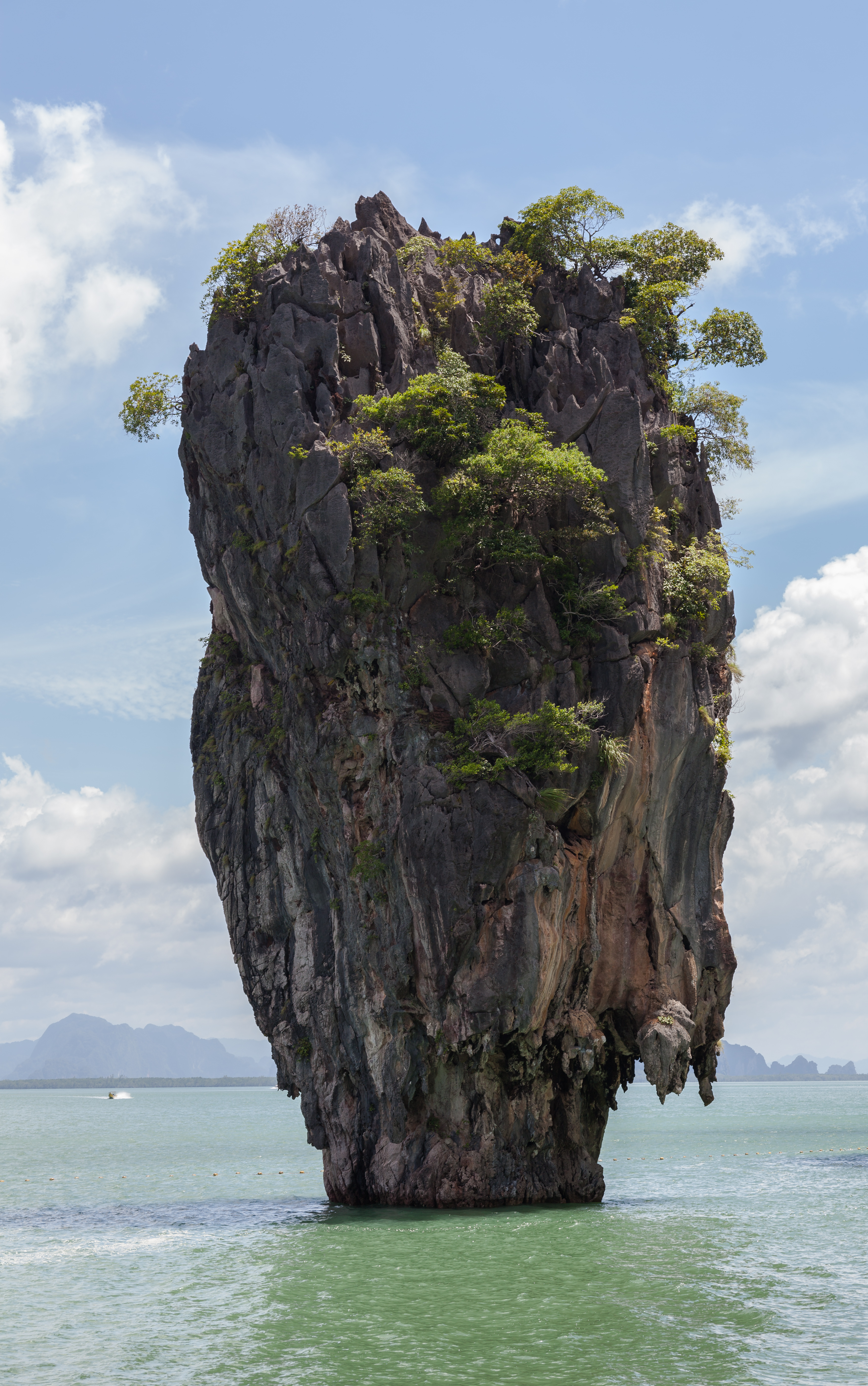
- Ko Ta Pu, aka James Bond Island, part of Phang Nga Bay, Kalai, Takua Thung

- District location in Phang Nga province
- Coordinates: 8°23′32″N 98°27′7″E
- Country: Thailand
- Province: Phang Nga

Area
  - Total: 610.8 km^{2} (235.8 sq mi)

Population (1 January 2004)
  - Total: 40,392
  - Density: 66.1/km^{2} (171/sq mi)
- Time zone: UTC+7 (ICT)
- Postal code: 82130
- Geocode: 8204

Takua Thung (Thai: ตะกั่วทุ่ง, pronounced [tā.kùa̯ tʰûŋ]) is a district (amphoe) in the Phang Nga province in the south of Thailand.

== History ==
The old city hall was in Ban Khai, Tambon Bang Thong, Thai Mueang district. In 1894 Burmese troops attacked Mueang Takua Pa. Thalang and Takua Thung were the next targets. Then people of Takua Thung moved the city center to Tambon Kra Som, where it is located today. Takua Thung was downgraded to a district of Phang Nga in 1899.

== Geography ==
Neighboring districts are (from the north clockwise) Thai Mueang and Mueang Phang Nga. To the southwest is the Phang Nga Bay, to the south is the district Thalang of Phuket province, separated by the Pak Phra Strait. To the west is the Andaman Sea.

Namtok Raman Forest Park protects a 0.2 km^{2} area around a scenic waterfall. The park was established on 26 October 1983. Most of the Phang Nga Bay coastline is part of the Ao Phang Nga National Park.

The most important temple within the district is Wat Suwannakhuha, also commonly known as Wat Tham (lit. 'cave temple') due to several caves within a hill inside the temple area. The largest of these caves is decorated with Buddha images as well as stalactites and stalagmites.

== Administration ==
The district is divided into seven sub-districts (tambons), which are further subdivided into 68 villages (mubans). There are two townships (thesaban tambons) in the district, Krasom and Khok Kloi, each covering parts of the same-named tambon. Each of the tambons is administered by a tambon administrative organization (TAO). The sub-district of Khok Kloi will be the site of the Phang Nga airport.

| No. | Name | Thai name | Villages | Pop. |
| 1. | Tham | ถ้ำ | 9 | 3,596 |
| 2. | Krasom | กระโสม | 8 | 5,921 |
| 3. | Kalai | กะไหล | 12 | 5,801 |
| 4. | Tha Yu | ท่าอยู่ | 7 | 3,284 |
| 5. | Lo Yung | หล่อยูง | 10 | 5,815 |
| 6. | Khok Kloi | โคกกลอย | 14 | 11,456 |
| 7. | Khlong Khian | คลองเคียน | 8 | 4,519 |

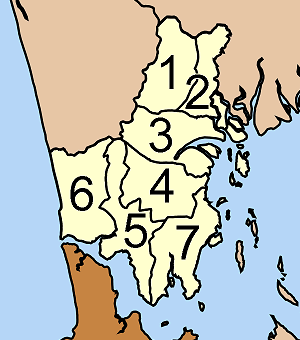
