= Sukhothai Airport =

Airport in northern Thailand

Sukhothai Airport สนามบินสุโขทัย
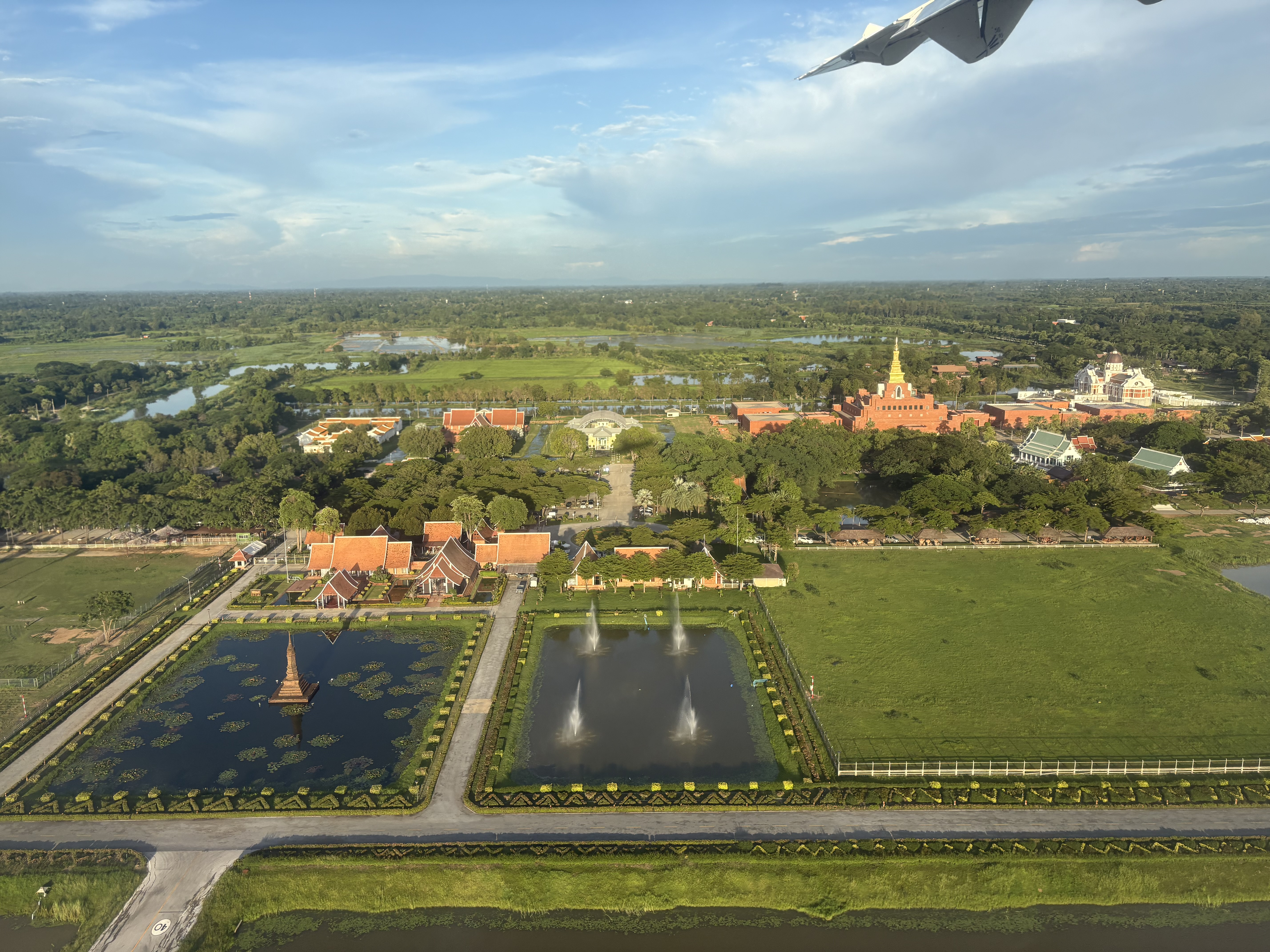
- The airport complex, including its museum, at departure
- IATA: THS; ICAO: VTPO

Summary
- Airport type: Private
- Owner/Operator: Bangkok Airways
- Serves: Sukhothai
- Location: Sawankhalok, Sukhothai, Thailand
- Opened: 12 April 1996; 30 years ago
- Elevation AMSL: 179 ft / 55 m
- Coordinates: 17°14′16″N 099°49′05″E

Maps
- Location of airport in Thailand
- Interactive map of Sukhothai Airport

Runways
Direction	Length		Surface
Direction	m	ft	Surface
18/36	2,100	6,890	Asphalt

Statistics (2015)
- Aircraft movements: 1,473
- Total passengers: 57,143

Sukhothai Airport (IATA: THS, ICAO: VTPO) is a privately-owned airport by Bangkok Airways in Sawankhalok district, Sukhothai province in northern Thailand. Covering the area of more than 3,000 rai, the airport spans three subdistricts of Sawankhalok; Khlong Krachong, Tha Thong, and Yan Yao. Owned and operated privately by Bangkok Airways, the airport is served by Bangkok Airways with one destination being Bangkok. It sees four total flights per day; departure and arrival at two timeslots.

Began construction in 1992 and opened in 1996, the airport saw its inaugurating flight on 12 April 1996. In addition to flight operations, the airport offers other tourist activities including its own museum, zoo, and an organic farm project that operates a restaurant and agricultural learning centre.

== Airline and destination ==
Airlines	Destinations
Bangkok Airways	Bangkok–Suvarnabhumi

== Facilities ==
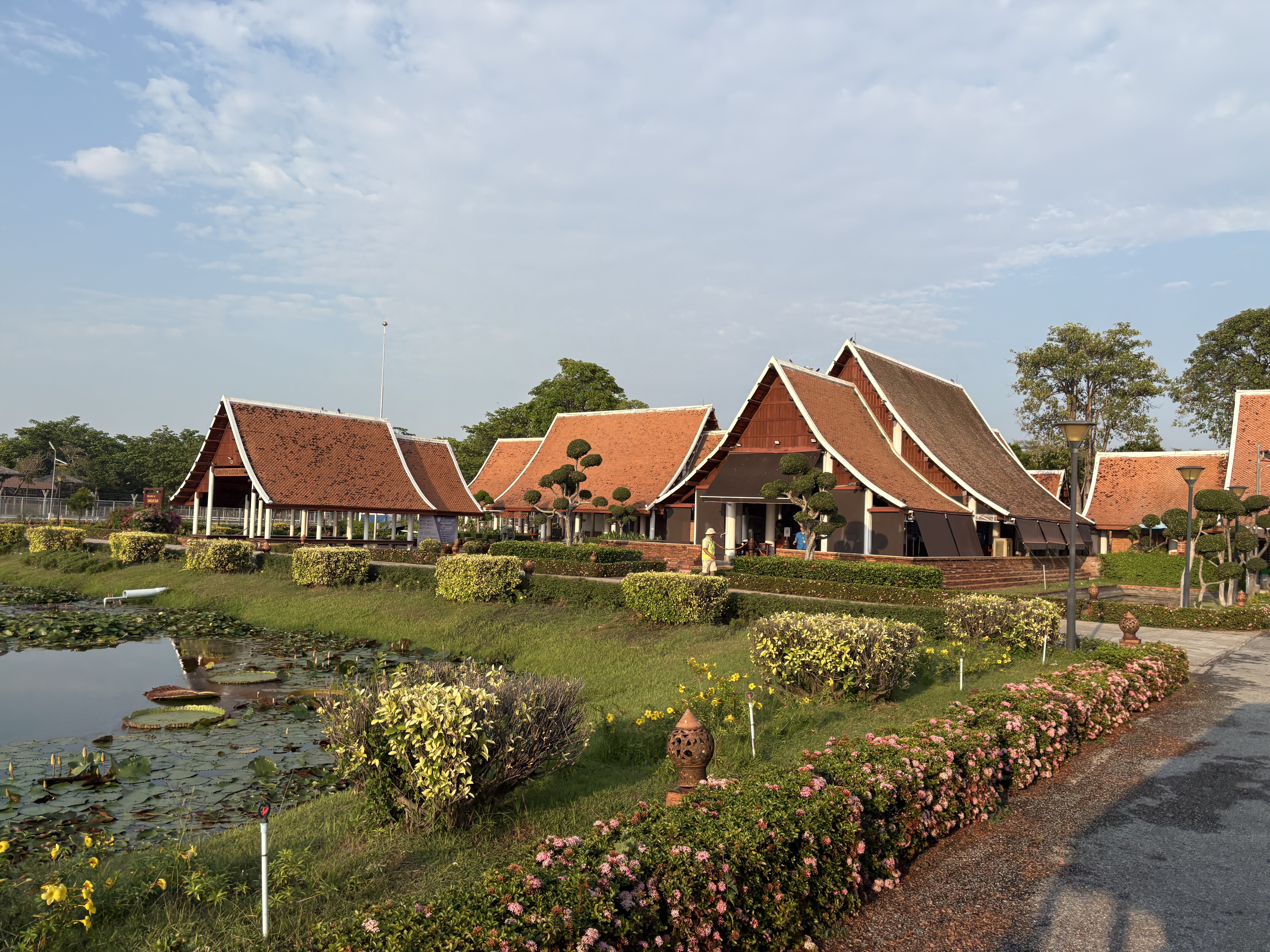
The terminal building as seen from the air side

The terminal building has an open plan with design utilising elements of Sukhothai architecture. The building was awarded the best architectural prize of 1998 by the Association of Siamese Architects.

Within the airport complex is home to multiple Buddha images of different artistic styles and a shrine to Phra Phrom.

Of the total area of more than 3,000 rai, 600 of which is allocated to the airport's own organic farm which supplies its produces to the airline, the airport and its accommodations. In addition to internal uses, the produces are used and sold at its own restaurant Khrua Sukho. The farm began in 1999 as a 3-rai rice field. Todays it also operates as an organic agricultural learning centre.

Sukhothai Airport Museum is a privately-owned museum located within the airport premise. The museum consists of three sub-museums; the Fossil Museum, the Elephant Museum, and the Petrified Wood Museum. Amongst its collection are actual fossils of dinosaurs and a meteor, all of which are private properties of Prasert Prasarttong-Osoth, the founder of Bangkok Airways and hence the airport.
