= Samui Airport =

Airport in southern Thailand

Samui International Airport ท่าอากาศยานนานาชาติสมุย

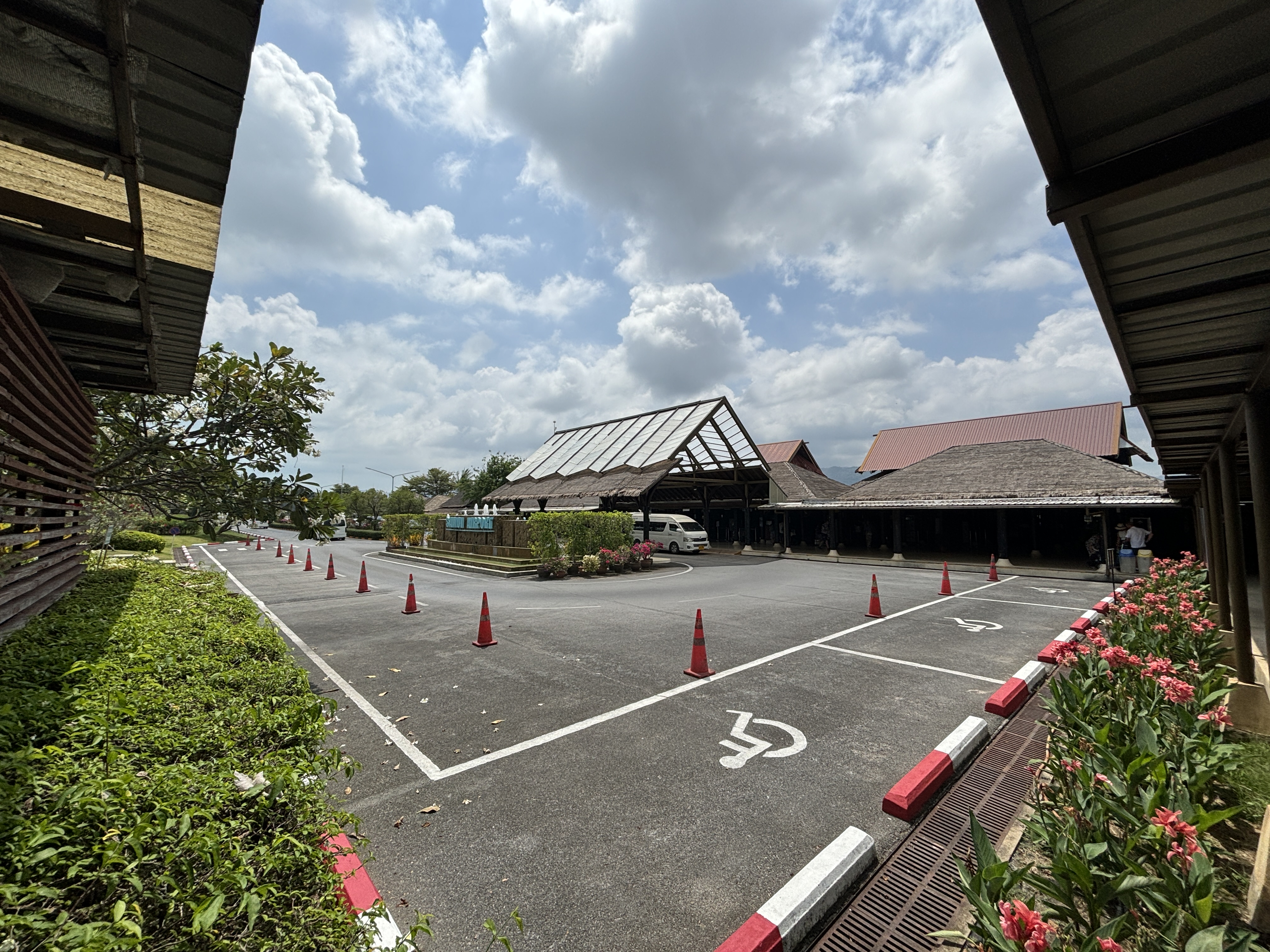
- IATA: USM; ICAO: VTSM

Summary
- Airport type: Private
- Owner/Operator: Bangkok Airways
- Serves: Ko Samui
- Location: Bo Phut, Ko Samui, Surat Thani, Thailand
- Opened: 25 April 1989; 37 years ago
- Operating base for: Bangkok Airways
- Elevation AMSL: 64 ft (20 m)
- Coordinates: 09°32′52″N 100°03′44″E

Maps
- Location of airport in Thailand
- Interactive map of Samui International Airport

Runways
Direction	Length		Surface
Direction	ft	m	Surface
17/35	6,890	2,100	Asphalt

Statistics (2015)
- Aircraft movements: 19,467
- Total passengers: 2,051,289

Samui International Airport (Thai: ท่าอากาศยานนานาชาติสมุย) (IATA: USM, ICAO: VTSM), also known as Ko Samui Airport or Koh Samui Airport, is a privately owned international airport on the island of Ko Samui (Koh Samui) in Thailand. It is located in the island’s Bo Phut subdistrict. The airport is roughly 2 km north of the main city and largest resort centre on the island, Chaweng. It was built by Bangkok Airways. Construction began in 1982 and the airport was officially opened in April 1989.

== Facilities ==
Samui Airport has a unique, open-air design, with the indoor areas being the gift shop, ticket office, toilets, and VIP lounge area. It is also the country's seventh-busiest airport, handling more than a million passengers annually. The airport has domestic and international terminals, and a building for check-in and baggage claim. The international terminal is about 50 metres north of the domestic terminal. Samui Airport is near the Big Buddha Pier, where ferries depart for Ko Pha-ngan. High-speed ferries to Ko Tao and Chumphon depart from the Maenam Beach Pier, approximately 6 km northwest of the airport.

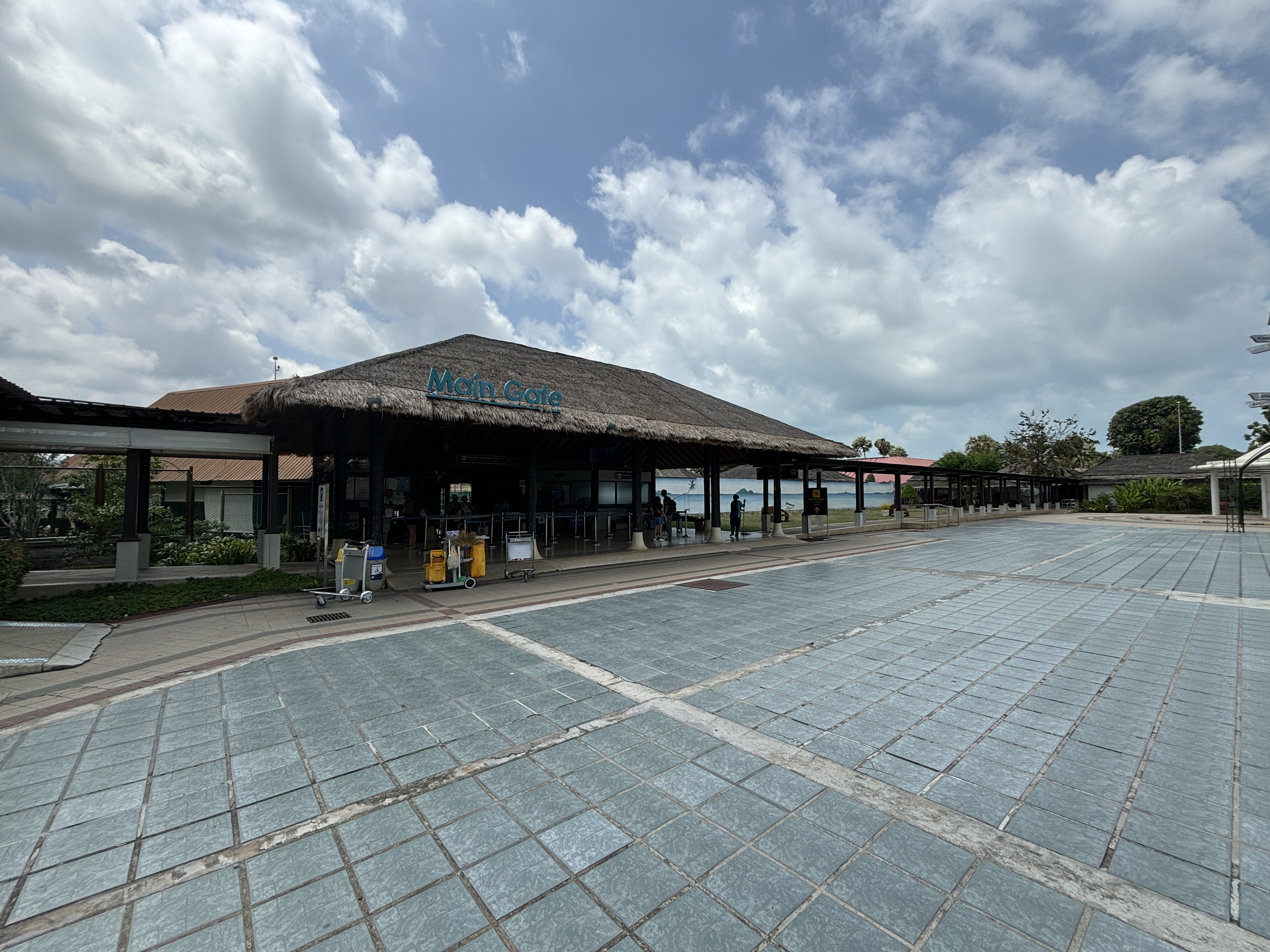
Domestic departure entrance

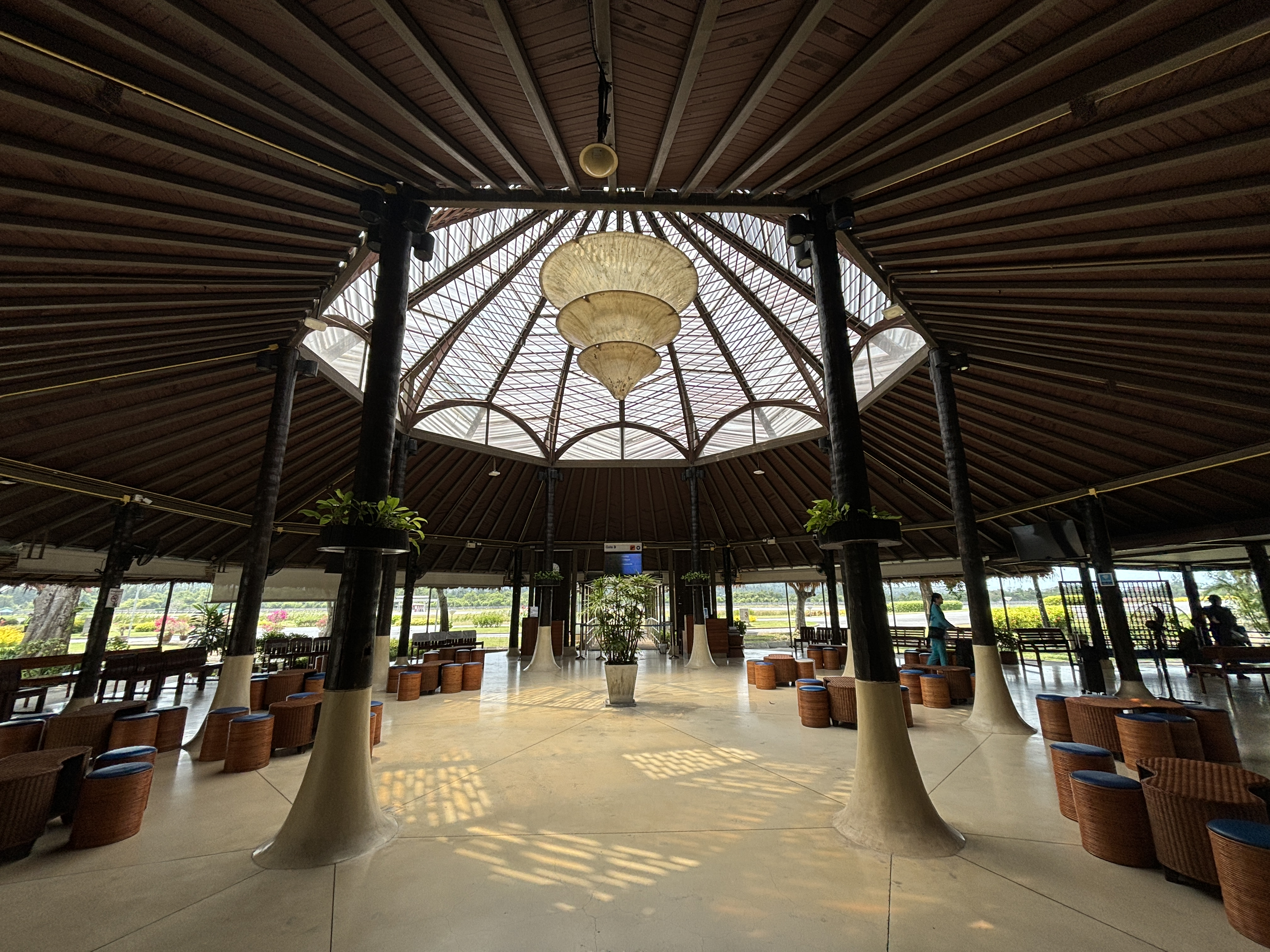
Waiting area of the domestic terminal

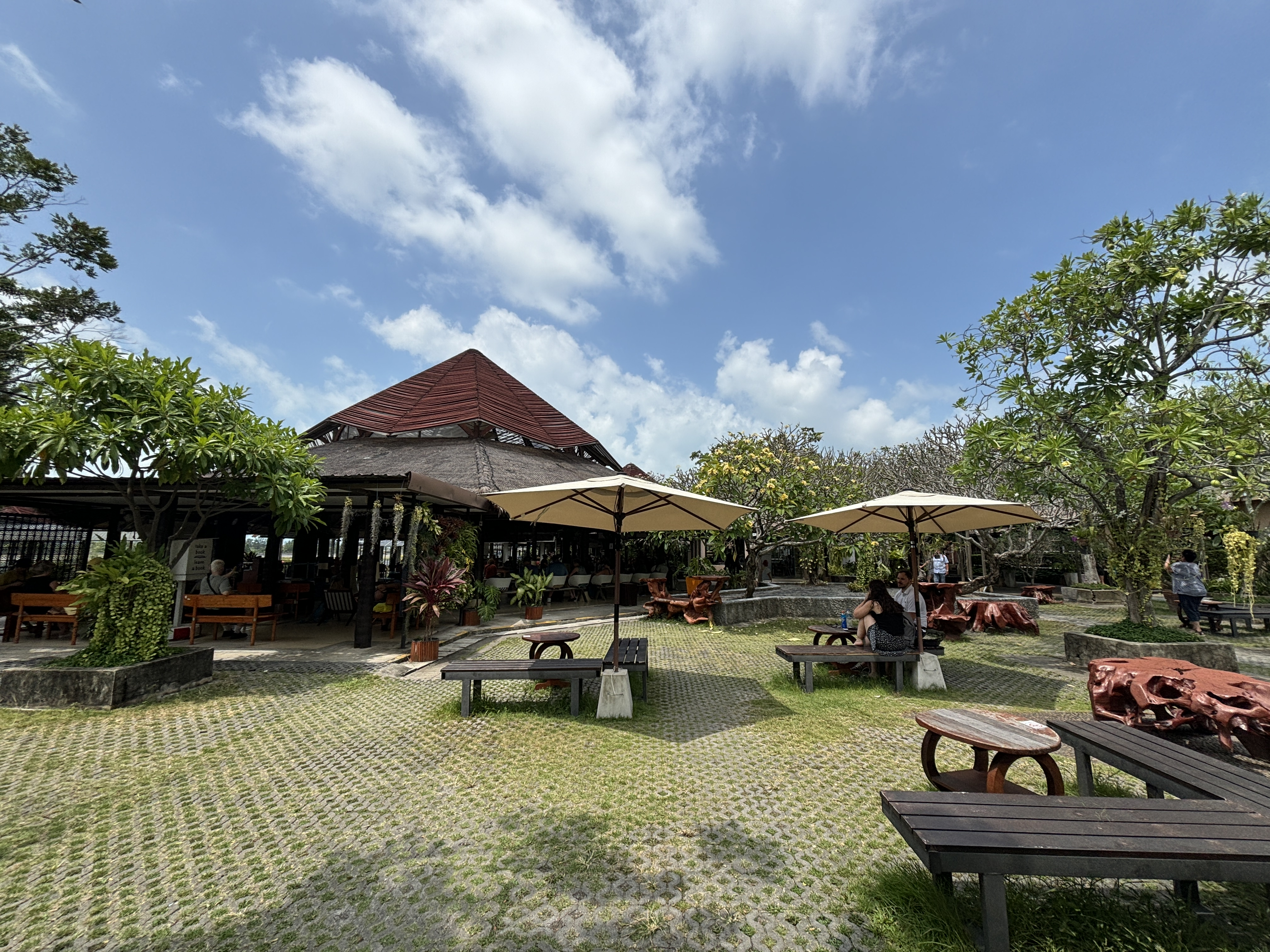
Open-space waiting area of the domestic terminal

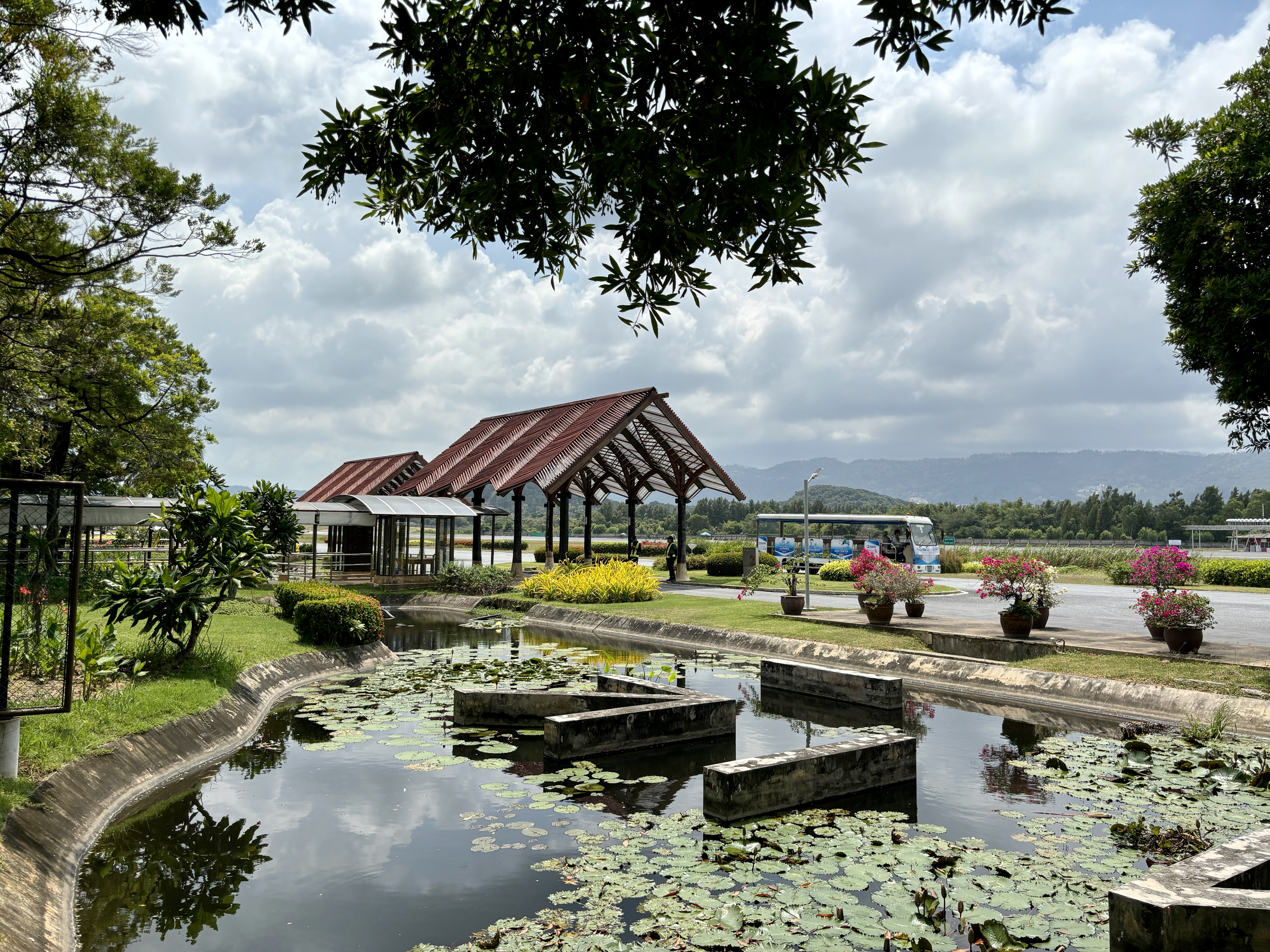
Boarding gate of the domestic terminal

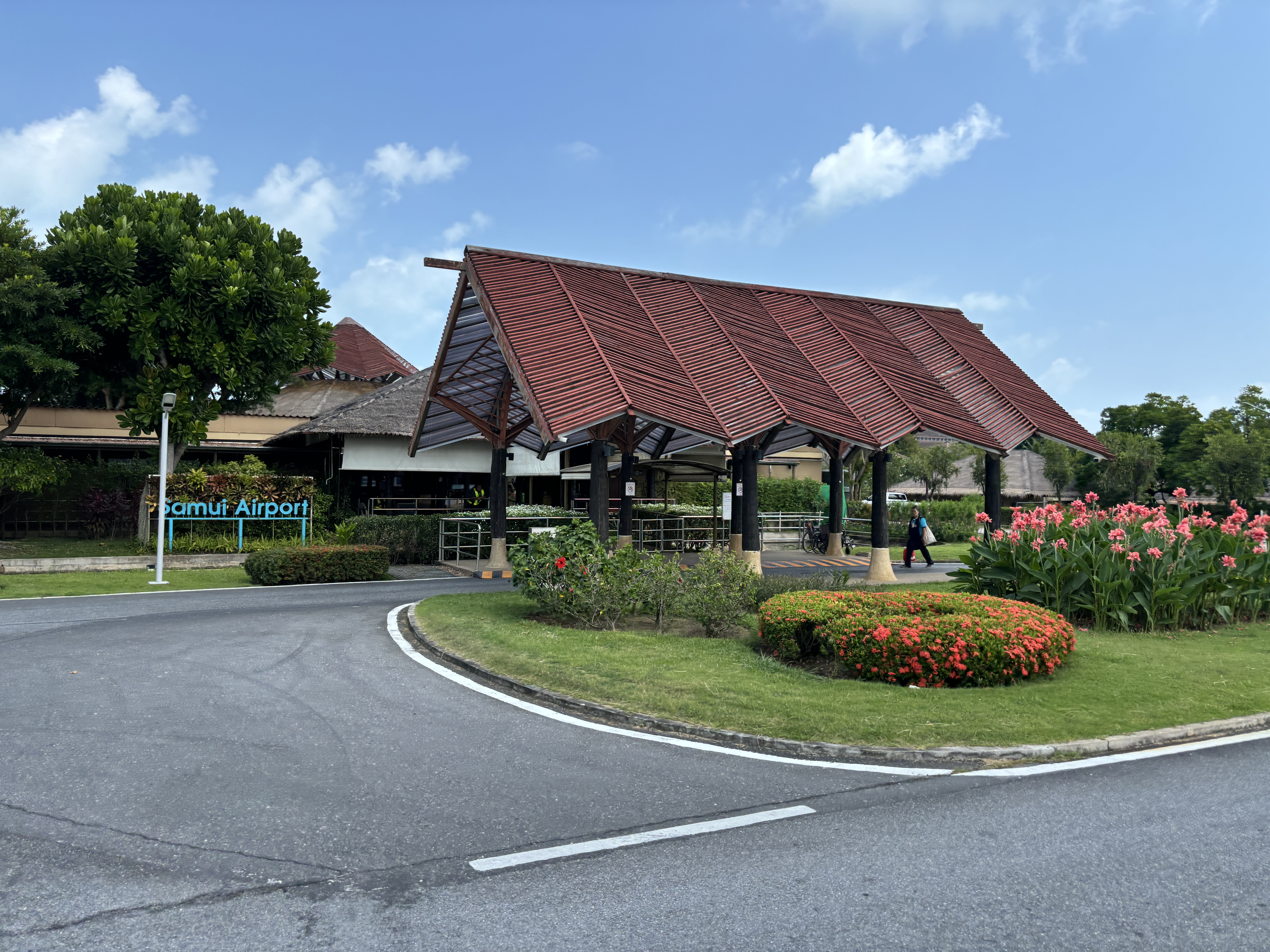
Airside of the arrival terminal

== Airlines and destinations ==
Airlines	Destinations
Bangkok Airways	Bangkok–Don Mueang, Bangkok–Suvarnabhumi, Chiang Mai, Hong Kong, Krabi, Kuala Lumpur, Pattaya, Phuket, Rayong, Singapore
Berjaya Air	Kuala Lumpur–Subang
Scoot	Singapore

== Statistics ==
Year	Flights	Arriving passengers	Departing passengers	Total passengers
2005	15,818	584,023	621,313	1,205,336
2006	18,762	689,063	711,196	1,400,259
2007	15,783	577,600	611,554	1,189,154
2008	17,707	673,851	691,283	1,365,439
2015		1,024,373		
2019	14,325			1,208,882
Source: Thailand's Department of Civil Aviation & C9 Hotel Works

== Accidents and incidents ==
- On 21 November 1990, Bangkok Airways Flight 125, a Bombardier Dash 8, crashed while attempting to land in heavy rain and high winds. All 38 people on board were killed.
- On 4 August 2009, Bangkok Airways Flight 266, an ATR 72 arriving from Krabi skidded off the runway, killing one of the pilots.
