= Trat Airport =

Airport in eastern Thailand

Trat Airport ท่าอากาศยานตราด
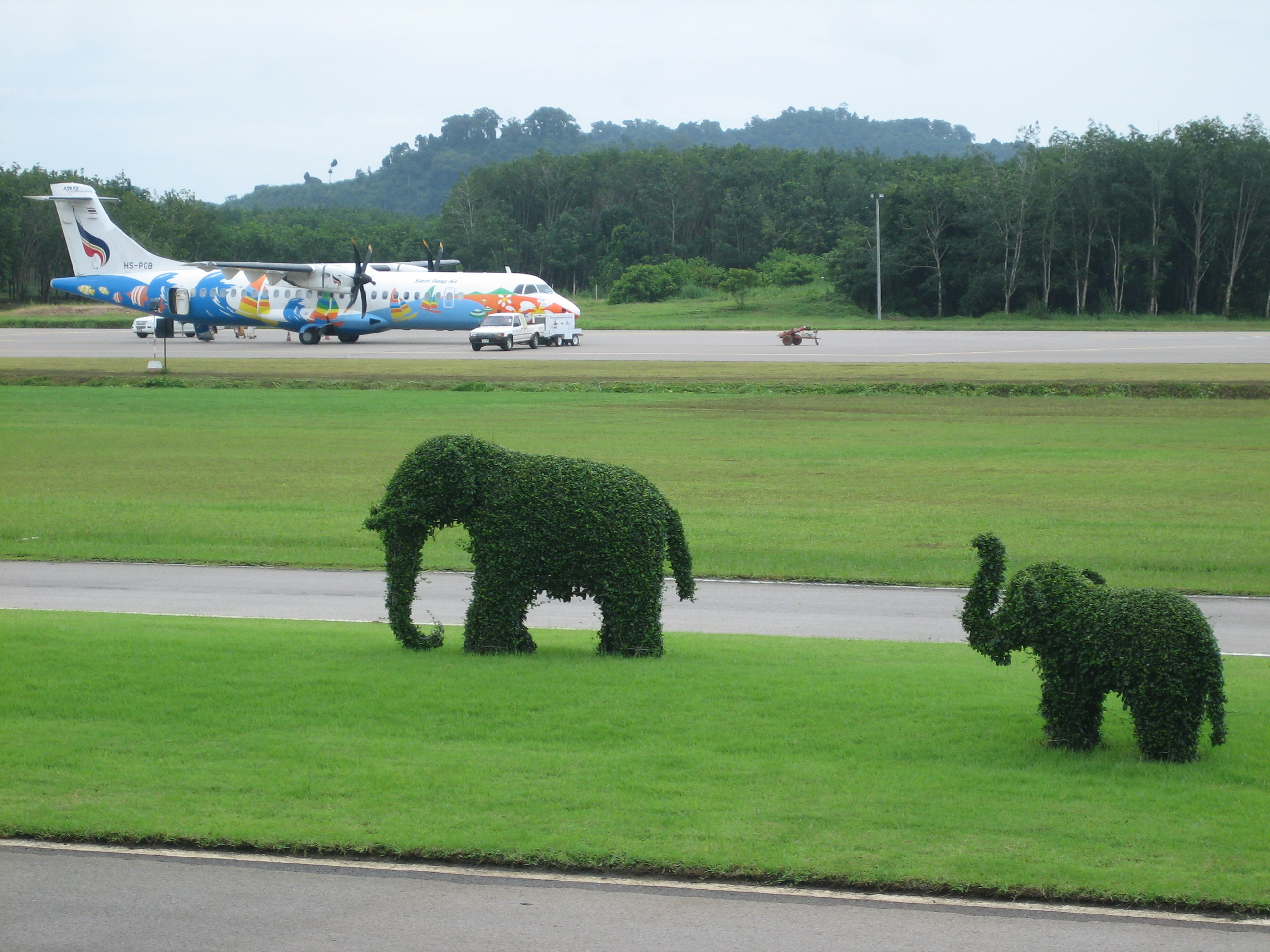
- IATA: TDX; ICAO: VTBO

Summary
- Airport type: Private
- Owner/Operator: Bangkok Airways
- Serves: Trat / Ko Chang
- Location: Bang Pit, Laem Ngop, Trat, Thailand
- Opened: 8 April 2003; 23 years ago
- Elevation AMSL: 105 ft / 32 m
- Coordinates: 12°16′28.46″N 102°19′08.25″E
- Website: www.tratairport.com

Maps
- Location of airport in Thailand
- Interactive map of Trat Airport

Runways
Direction	Length		Surface
Direction	ft	m	Surface
05/23	5,906	1,800	Asphalt

Statistics (2015)
- Aircraft movements: 3,041
- Total passengers: 80,987

Trat Airport (IATA: TDX, ICAO: VTBO) is in Bang Pit subdistrict, Laem Ngop district, Trat province in eastern Thailand. Trat Airport was opened in 2003 and is owned and operated by Bangkok Airways. The airport has one tarmac runway, 1,800 m by 45 m, with a small open-air terminal. The airport has two pavilion-style passenger terminals, and one pavilion offers a restaurant and restrooms. The airport offers customs and immigration services, allowing passengers to check in through to their final destinations without having to do so at Suvarnabhumi Airport.

Bangkok Airways operates daily flights from Suvarnabhumi Airport to Trat with its ATR-72 turboprop aircraft.

== History ==
Trat Airport was officially opened on 31 March 2003. However, the first flight, an ATR 72-200, landed on 18 April 2003, from Don Mueang International Airport.

== Airlines and destinations ==
Airlines	Destinations
Bangkok Airways	Bangkok–Suvarnabhumi
