= Bangkok Airways Flight 266 =

2009 aviation accident in Thailand

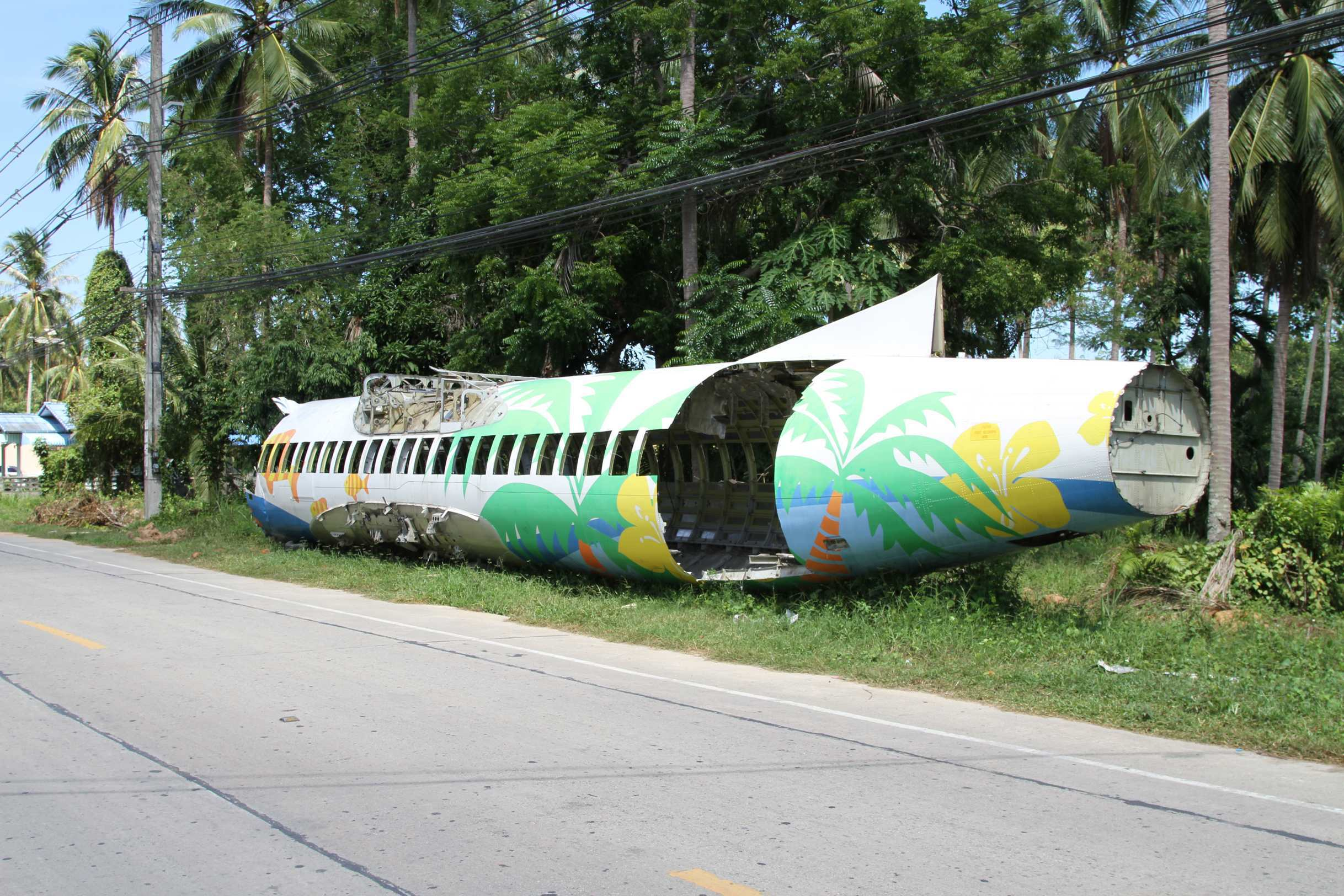
- The destroyed fuselage sitting on the side of a road in 2013

Accident
- Date: 4 August 2009
- Summary: Runway excursion on landing
- Site: Samui Airport, Thailand; 09°32′52″N 100°03′44″E

Aircraft
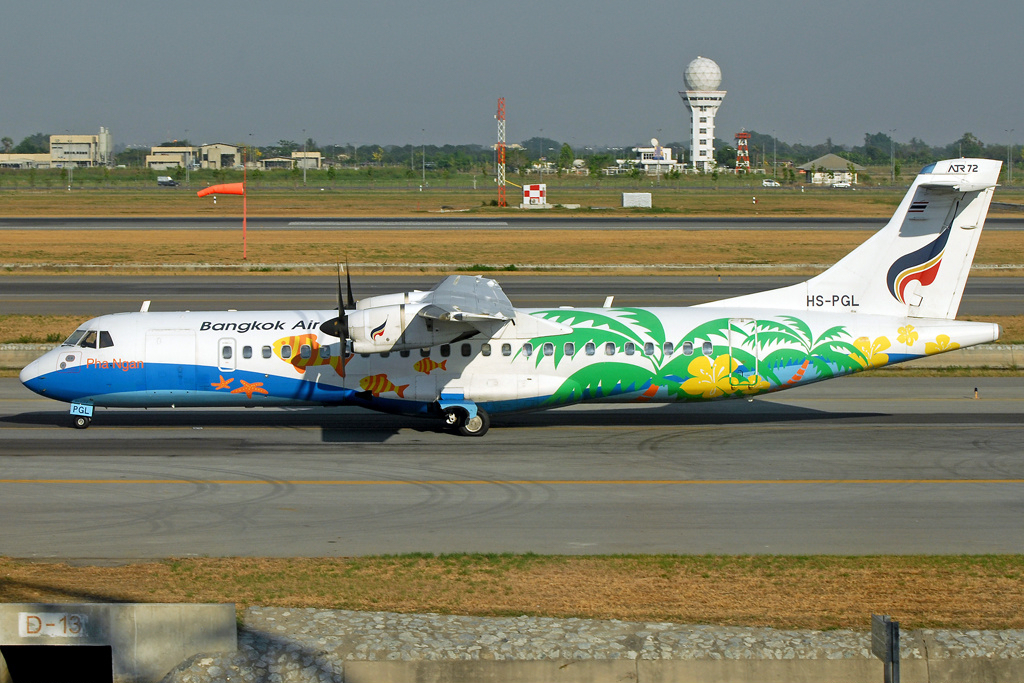
- HS-PGL, the aircraft involved in the accident, pictured in March 2009
- Aircraft type: ATR 72-500
- Aircraft name: Pha Ngan
- Operator: Bangkok Airways
- IATA flight No.: PG266
- ICAO flight No.: BKP266
- Call sign: BANGKOK AIR 266
- Registration: HS-PGL
- Flight origin: Krabi Airport, Thailand
- Destination: Samui Airport, Thailand
- Occupants: 72
- Passengers: 68
- Crew: 4
- Fatalities: 1
- Injuries: 41
- Survivors: 71

Bangkok Airways Flight 266 was a scheduled domestic passenger flight from Krabi Airport to Samui Airport, Thailand. On 4 August 2009, the aircraft skidded off the runway on landing and crashed into an old and unmanned control tower. One pilot died and 41 other people were injured.

== Accident ==
The aircraft is reported to have skidded off the runway and hit an old, unmanned control tower that was used as a fire-fighting station. The accident happened at around 14:15 local time (07:15 UTC). One pilot was reported to have been killed. The co-pilot, who was stuck in the aircraft for more than two hours, was among the last evacuated from the stricken plane. Serious injuries included four passengers – two British, one Italian and one Swiss suffered broken legs, while two other British suffered less severe injuries. The co-pilot also had leg injuries. A total of 41 people were injured. The METAR in force at the time of the accident was METAR VTSM 040700Z 29015KT 9000 FEW020TCU SCT120 BKN300 31/25 Q1007 A2974 TCU-NW. This translates as METAR for Samui Airport, issued on the 4th of the month at 07:00 UTC, wind at 15 knots (28 km/h; 17 mph), direction 290° visibility 9 kilometres (5.6 mi; 4.9 nmi), few clouds at 2,000 feet (610 m), scattered clouds at 12,000 feet (3,700 m), broken clouds at 30,000 feet (9,100 m), temperature 31 °C (88 °F), dewpoint 25 °C (77 °F), altimeter 1007 milibar, towering cumulonimbus to north west.

== Aircraft ==
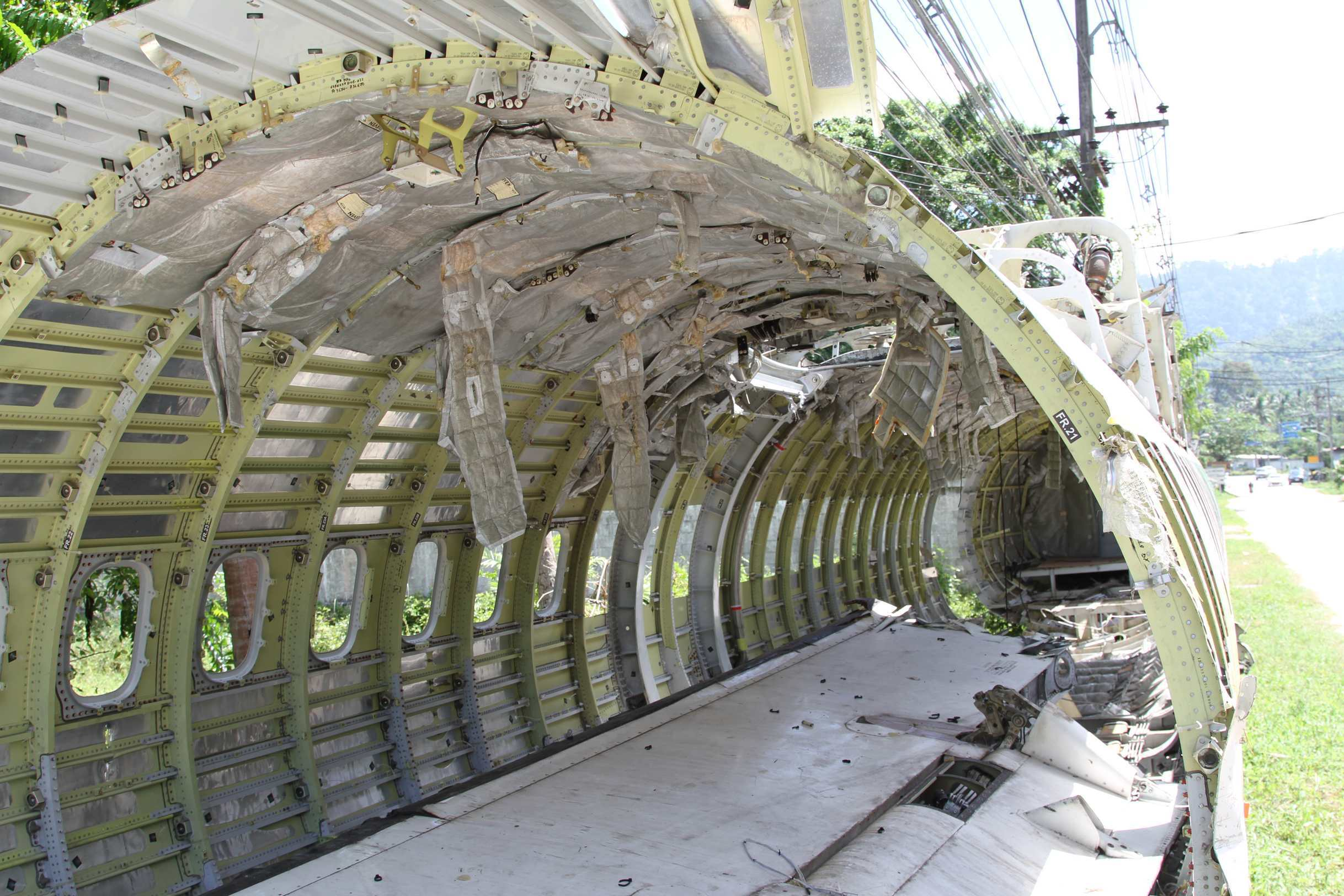
The interior of the fuselage

The aircraft involved was an ATR 72-500, registered as HS-PGL, msn 670. The aircraft first flew on 6 June 2001 with French registration F-WWER. It entered service with Bangkok Airways on 16 July 2001 re-registered HS-PGL. On 29 May 2006, it entered service with Siem Reap Airways International, returning to Bangkok Airways on 7 January 2009 after Siem Reap Airways International ceased trading. The aircraft was named Pha Ngan, and had been in service for approx. 20,000 hrs.

== Investigation ==
The Aircraft Accident Investigation Committee of Thailand released the final report on 30 September 2025. According to the final report, this accident was caused by "the weather conditions at Samui International Airport when the aircraft was landing, with a surface wind direction 300 degrees and gusts between 25 and 35 knots, combined with the pilot did not go around when conducting a non-stabilized approach."

== Aftermath ==
The fuselage of the aircraft spent a few years on roadsides in different parts of Samui before being sunk in October 2013 as part of Majcha Air Samui Artificial Reef Project.
