= Krabi International Airport =

Airport in southern Thailand

Krabi International Airport ท่าอากาศยานนานาชาติกระบี่
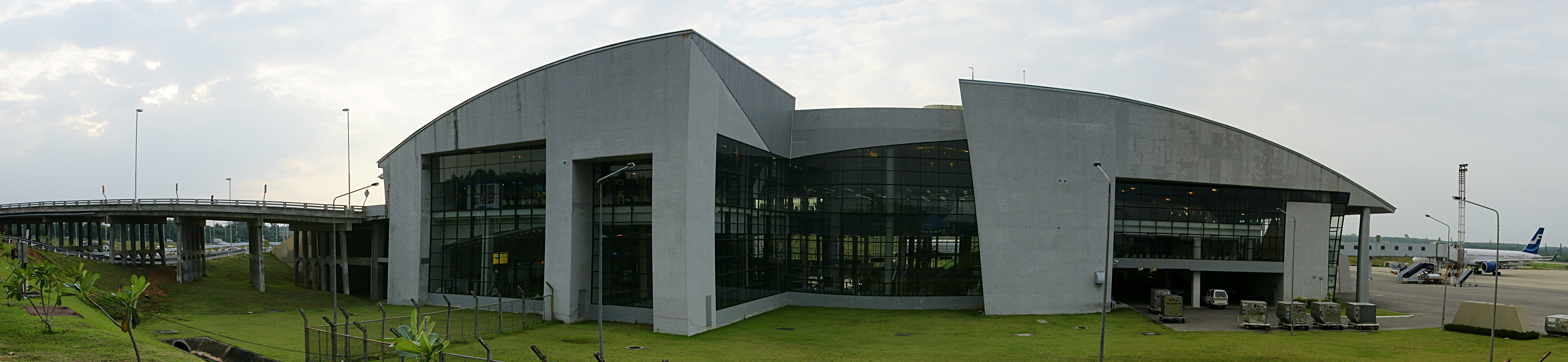

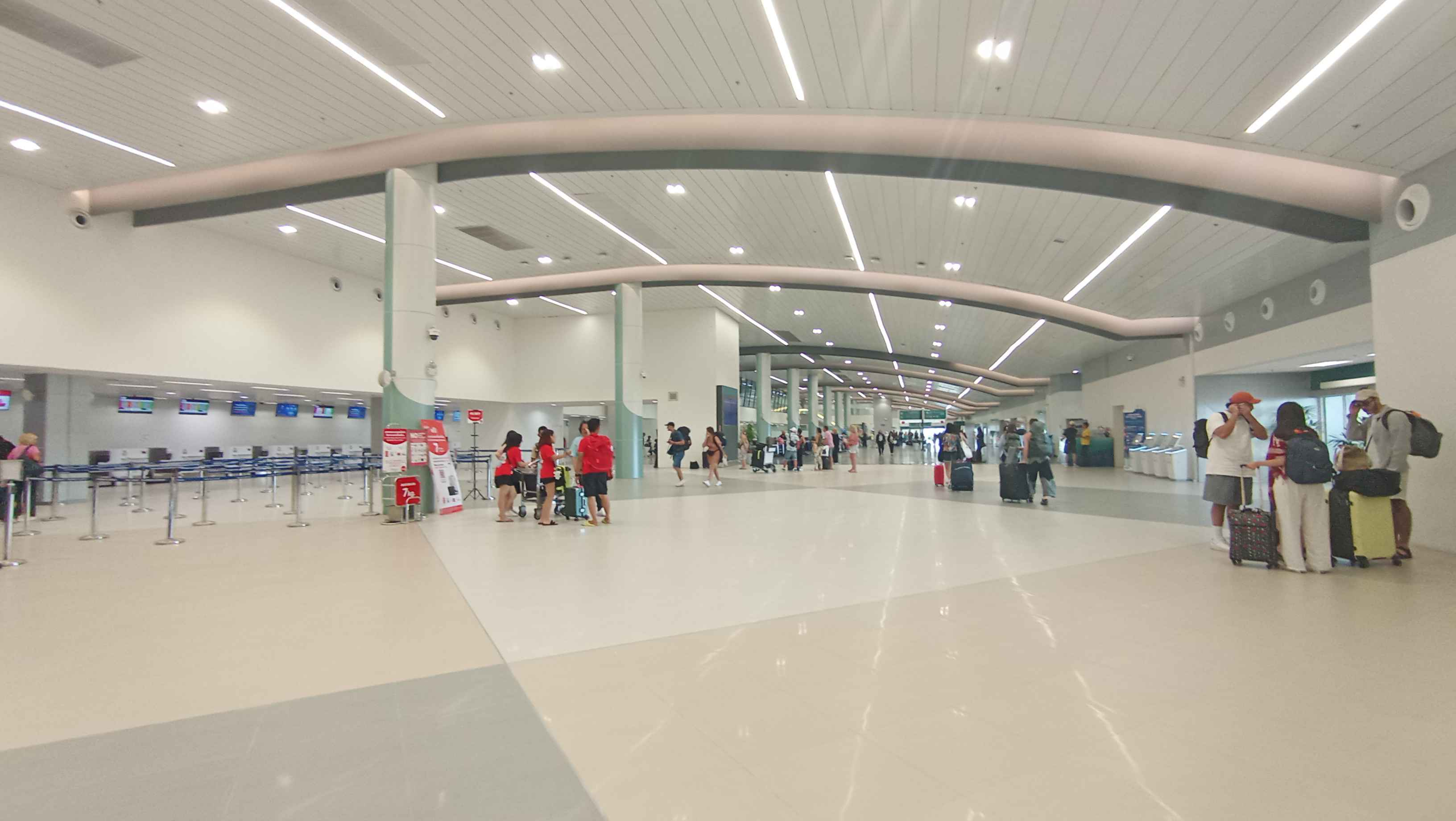
- IATA: KBV; ICAO: VTSG

Summary
- Airport type: Public
- Operator: Department of Airports
- Serves: Krabi
- Location: Nuea Khlong subdistrict, Nuea Khlong, Krabi, Thailand
- Opened: 10 July 1999; 27 years ago
- Operating base for: Thai AirAsia
- Elevation AMSL: 82 ft (25 m)
- Coordinates: 08°06′03″N 098°59′05″E

Maps
- Location in Thailand
- Interactive map of Krabi International Airport

Runways
Direction	Length		Surface
Direction	ft	m	Surface
14/32	9,850	3,002	Asphalt

Statistics (2025)
- Total passengers: 3,053,553 ▲62.88%
- International passengers: 764,416 ▲244.39%
- Domestic passengers: 2,289,137 ▲42.96%
- Aircraft movements: 22,718 ▲57.57%
- Freight (tonnes): 294.153 ▲8.55%
- Sources: Department of Airports

Krabi International Airport (IATA: KBV, ICAO: VTSG) is an international airport in Nuea Khlong subdistrict, Nuea Khlong district, Krabi province in Southern Thailand. It is about 7 kilometres (4 mi) east of downtown Krabi. The airport opened in 1999. In 2017, the airport handled over 4.3 million passengers. The terminal is designed for three million passengers, a number that has already been exceeded, and expansion will push its capacity to over 8 million.

== Airport operations ==
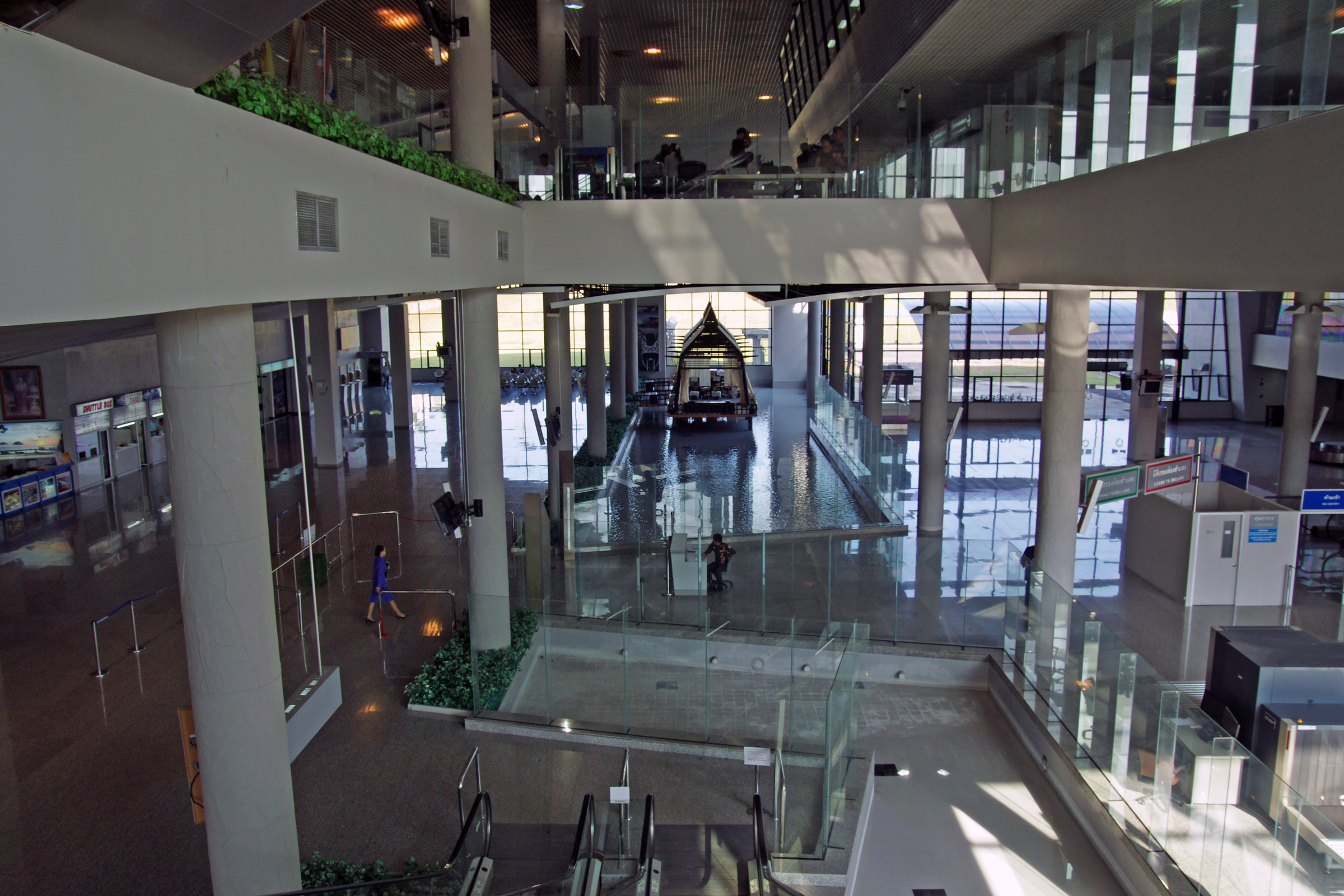
Departures area

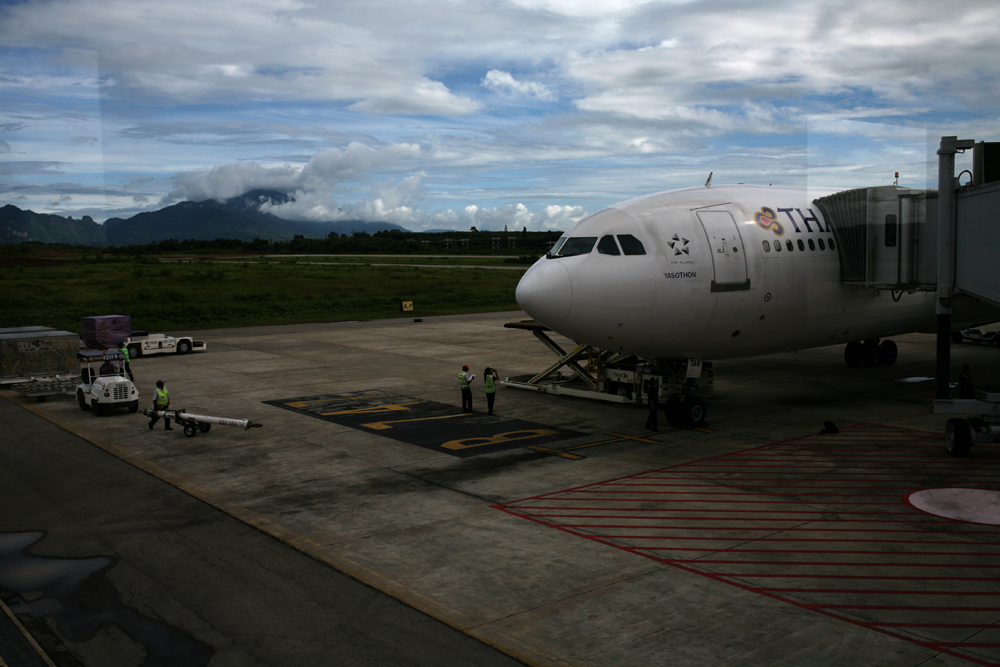
A Thai Airways International Airbus A300-600R during deplaning

On 10 February 2016, the Krabi Airport terminal was plunged into darkness for over six hours (09:00–15:30) due to an electrical power outage. The Provincial Electricity Authority (PEA) had notified Krabi Airport two days in advance that it would shut down power in the area for maintenance. Airport authorities activated back-up generators, but they did not work. Krabi's airport director stated after the event that management would rent generators in the future to prevent blackouts from happening. With no power for their computers, immigration officials were unable to access immigration databases and were forced to write down the details of 2,000 passengers for later vetting. The deputy national police chief in charge of security, Pol. Col. Srivara Ransibrahmanakul, assured the public that a follow-up check showed that no blacklisted people were allowed into the country during the incident.

== Expansion ==
In 2018, the airport was allocated 6.6 billion baht to build a third terminal, renovate the existing two terminals and car park, and expand aircraft parking bays and associated electrical power infrastructure. In 2019, the Department of Airports announced a project to double the airport's capacity to eight million passengers per year. The airport will no longer be expanded after its final phase of expansion due to lack of space and the city's expansion, and will not be able to cope with the future traffic. A new international airport is proposed to be built in Phang Nga province, which is expected to be completed by 2025, and will serve as an alternative to Krabi airport.

== Airlines and destinations ==
Airlines	Destinations
Air Arabia	Sharjah
AirAsia	Bangkok–Suvarnabhumi, Kuala Lumpur–International
Bangkok Airways	Bangkok–Suvarnabhumi, Koh Samui
Etihad Airways	Seasonal: Abu Dhabi
Finnair	Seasonal: Helsinki (resumes 26 November 2026),
Firefly	Kuala Lumpur–International
flydubai	Dubai–International
IndiGo	Delhi–Indira Gandhi
LOT Polish Airlines	Seasonal charter: Warsaw–Chopin
Neos	Charter: Warsaw–Chopin; Seasonal charter: Prague
Nok Air	Bangkok–Don Mueang
Scandinavian Airlines	Seasonal: Copenhagen (begins 9 December 2026)
Scoot	Singapore
Thai AirAsia	Bangkok–Don Mueang, Bangkok–Suvarnabhumi, Chiang Mai
Thai Airways International	Bangkok–Suvarnabhumi
Thai Lion Air	Bangkok–Don Mueang
Thai VietJet Air	Bangkok–Suvarnabhumi
TUI fly Nordic	Seasonal charter: Gothenburg, Oslo

== Statistics ==
Krabi International Airport received 2.3 million passengers in 2023, which makes it the sixth busiest airport in the country.

Year	Total
2012	1,190,115
2013	1,668,250
2014	2,700,095
2015	3,689,672
2016	4,079,564
2017	4,339,599
2018	4,193,099
2019	3,658,131
2020	1,318,646
2021	405,432
2022	1,418,052
2023	2,309,797
2024	2,589,636
2025	3,053,553

== See also ==
- List of airports in Thailand
- Phang Nga airport
