= Bangkok Airways =

Boutique airline of Thailand

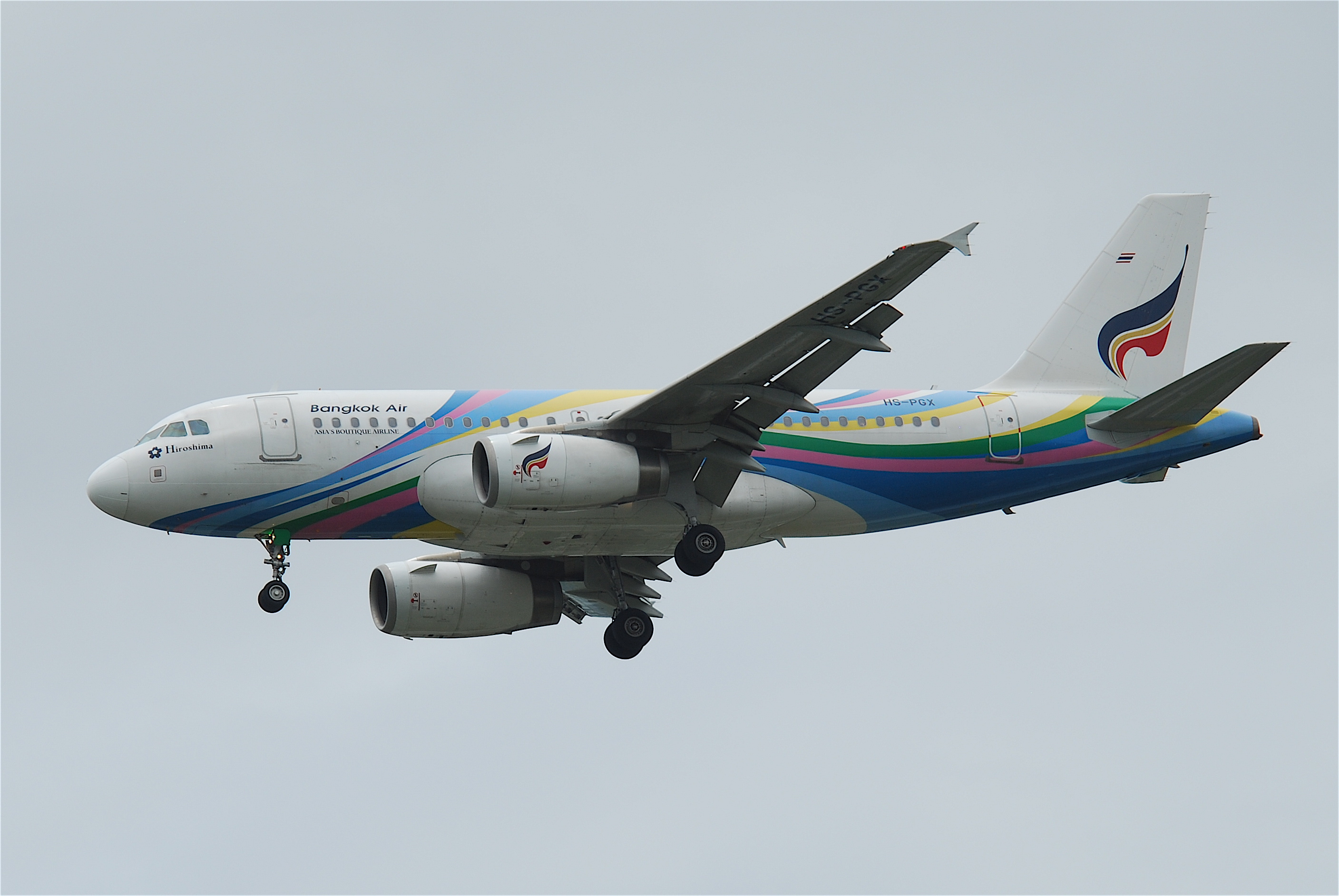
- Bangkok Airways Airbus A319
IATA	ICAO	Call sign
PG	BKP	BANGKOK AIR
- Founded: 1968; 58 years ago (as Sahakol Air)
- Commenced operations: 1989; 37 years ago (as Bangkok Airways)
- AOC #: AOC.0001
- Operating bases: Bangkok–Suvarnabhumi; Chiang Mai; Hat Yai; Krabi; Phuket; Samui
- Hubs: Bangkok-Suvarnabhumi; Samui
- Frequent-flyer program: Flyer Bonus
- Fleet size: 23
- Destinations: 20
- Parent company: Prasarttong-Osoth Co
- Traded as: SET: BA
- Headquarters: Chomphon subdistrict, Chatuchak district, Bangkok, Thailand
- Key people: Puttipong Prasarttong-Osoth (president & CEO)
- Revenue: ▲29,418 million baht (2019)
- Net income: ▲351 million baht (2019)
- Total assets: ▼61,908 million baht (2019)
- Employees: 3,010 (2019)
- Website: www.bangkokair.com

Bangkok Airways Public Company Limited (Thai: บริษัท การบินกรุงเทพ จำกัด (มหาชน)) is a regional airline based in Bangkok, Thailand. It operates scheduled services to destinations in Thailand, Cambodia, Hong Kong, Laos, Maldives, and Singapore. Its main base is Suvarnabhumi Airport in the Thai capital Bangkok.

== History ==
The airline was established in 1968 as Sahakol Air, operating air taxi services under contract from the Overseas International Construction Company (OICC), an American construction company, the United States Operations Mission (USOM), and a number of other organisations engaged in oil and natural gas exploration in the Gulf of Thailand. It began scheduled services in 1986, becoming Thailand's first privately owned domestic airline. It rebranded to become Bangkok Airways in 1989. The airline was owned by Prasert Prasarttong-Osoth (92.31 percent), Sahakol Estate (4.3 percent), Bangkok Dusit Medical Services (1.2 percent), and other shareholders (2.19 percent). At one point, it also wholly owned subsidiary airline Siem Reap Airways in Cambodia.

It built its own airport, Samui Airport on the island of Ko Samui, which opened in April 1989 and offers direct flights between the island and Chiang Mai, Hong Kong, Krabi, Pattaya, Phuket, and Singapore. The airline opened its second airport in Sukhothai Province in 1996. A third airport was built in Trat Province, opening in March 2003 to serve the tourism destination of Ko Chang.

The airline made its first foray into jet aircraft in 2000, when it started adding Boeing 717s to its fleet. Until that time, Bangkok Airways had flown propeller-driven aircraft, primarily the ATR 72. It had also operated the De Havilland Canada Dash 8, the Shorts 330 and for a short time a Fokker 100. The carrier added another jet, the Airbus A320, to its fleet in 2004.

Bangkok Airways planned to order wide-body aircraft as part of its ambition to expand its fleet but these plans to expand to the long haul market eventually fell short. It wanted to add its first wide-body jets in 2006 to serve longer-haul destinations such as the UK, India, and Japan and is looking at Airbus A330, Airbus A340 and Boeing 787 aircraft. In December 2005, Bangkok Airways announced it had decided to negotiate an order for six Airbus A350-800 aircraft in a 258-seat configuration, to be delivered to the airline commencing in 2013, but the order of the aircraft was cancelled in 2011 due to the further delay of the Airbus plane.

In 2007, Royal Household Secretary General Kaewkwan Watcharoethai awarded Prasert Prasarttong-Osoth a royal warrant to display the Garuda emblem.

In 2017, Bangkok Airways received a new Air Operator Certificate, recertified to safety standards set out by ICAO from the Civil Aviation Authority of Thailand.

On 20 November 2024, it was reported that Bangkok Airways will be wet-leasing two aircraft from Amelia from 1 December 2024 to 29 March 2025 to overcome the shortage of aircraft especially during the upcoming peak tourist season in Thailand.

By late 2024, Bangkok Airways' current jet fleet of Airbus A319 and A320 aircraft were aging and the airline confirmed that it was evaluating both the Airbus A220 and Embraer E-Jet E2 jets as possible replacements. The airline will soon put out a request for proposals from the manufacturers for this potential order with deliveries intended to begin around 2028.

== Financials ==
For the fiscal year ending 31 December 2019, Bangkok Airways reported a profit of 351 million baht on revenues of 29,418 million baht. Its assets were valued at 61,908 million baht. BA lost 300 million baht during the first quarter of 2020, compared with a profit of 500 million baht a year earlier. Earnings have continued to decline due to the COVID-19 pandemic, and the airline has asked for government assistance. As of 31 December 2019, BA employed 3,010 people.

== Destinations ==
As of June 2026, Bangkok Airways flies to the following destinations:

Country/territory	City/region	Airport	Notes	Refs
Cambodia	Phnom Penh	Phnom Penh International Airport	Airport Closed	
Cambodia	Phnom Penh	Techo International Airport		
Cambodia	Siem Reap	Siem Reap International Airport	Airport Closed	
Cambodia	Siem Reap	Siem Reap–Angkor International Airport		
China	Chengdu	Chengdu Shuangliu International Airport	Terminated	
China	Chengdu	Chengdu Tianfu International Airport	Terminated	
China	Chongqing	Chongqing Jiangbei International Airport	Terminated	
China	Jinghong	Xishuangbanna Gasa Airport	Terminated	
Hong Kong	Hong Kong	Hong Kong International Airport		
India	Bengaluru	Kempegowda International Airport	Terminated	
India	Mumbai	Chhatrapati Shivaji Maharaj International Airport	Terminated	
Laos	Luang Prabang	Luang Prabang International Airport		
Laos	Vientiane	Wattay International Airport	Terminated	
Malaysia	Kuala Lumpur	Kuala Lumpur International Airport	Terminated	
Maldives	Malé	Velana International Airport		
Myanmar	Mandalay	Mandalay International Airport	Terminated	
Myanmar	Naypyidaw	Nay Pyi Taw International Airport	Terminated	
Myanmar	Yangon	Yangon International Airport	Terminated	
Philippines	Cebu	Mactan–Cebu International Airport	Terminated	
Singapore	Singapore	Changi Airport		
Thailand	Bangkok	Don Mueang International Airport		
Thailand	Samut Prakan	Suvarnabhumi Airport	Base	
Thailand	Chiang Mai	Chiang Mai International Airport	Base	
Thailand	Chiang Rai	Chiang Rai International Airport	Terminated	
Thailand	Hat Yai	Hat Yai International Airport	Base	
Thailand	Ko Samui	Samui Airport	Base	
Thailand	Krabi	Krabi International Airport	Base	
Thailand	Lampang	Lampang Airport	Terminated	
Thailand	Mae Hong Son	Mae Hong Son Airport	Terminated	
Thailand	Pattaya	U-Tapao International Airport		
Thailand	Phuket	Phuket International Airport	Base	
Thailand	Sukhothai	Sukhothai Airport		
Thailand	Trat	Trat Airport		
Vietnam	Da Nang	Da Nang International Airport	Terminated	
Vietnam	Hanoi	Noi Bai International Airport	Terminated	
Vietnam	Nha Trang	Cam Ranh International Airport	Terminated	
Vietnam	Phu Quoc	Phu Quoc International Airport	Terminated	

=== Codeshare agreements ===
As of August 2024, Bangkok Airways has codeshare agreements with the following airlines.

- Air Astana
- Air France
- Austrian Airlines
- British Airways
- Cathay Pacific
- China Airlines
- El Al
- Emirates
- Etihad Airways
- EVA Air
- Finnair
- Garuda Indonesia
- Gulf Air
- Hong Kong Airlines
- Japan Airlines
- KLM
- Lao Airlines
- Lufthansa
- Malaysia Airlines
- Oman Air
- Philippine Airlines
- Qantas
- Qatar Airways
- Singapore Airlines
- Swiss International Air Lines
- Thai Airways International
- Turkish Airlines
- Vietnam Airlines
- WestJet
- XiamenAir

=== Interline agreements ===
- Air India
- APG Airlines
- Hahn Air
- Kuwait Airways
- Scoot
- Swiss International Air Lines

== Fleet ==
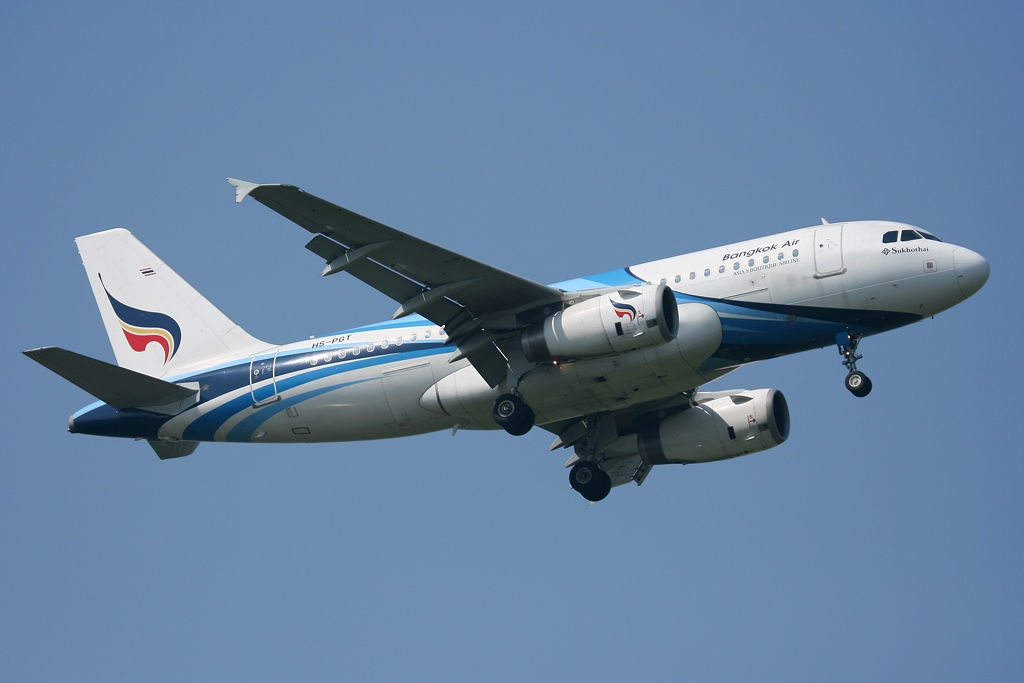
Bangkok Airways Airbus A319-100

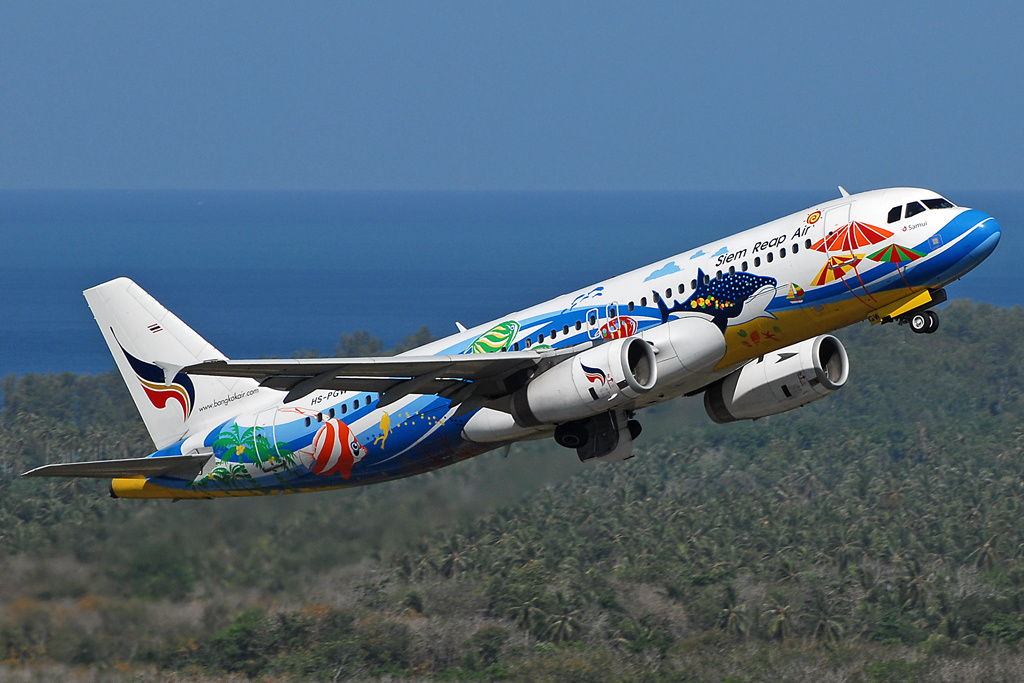
Bangkok Airways Airbus A320-200

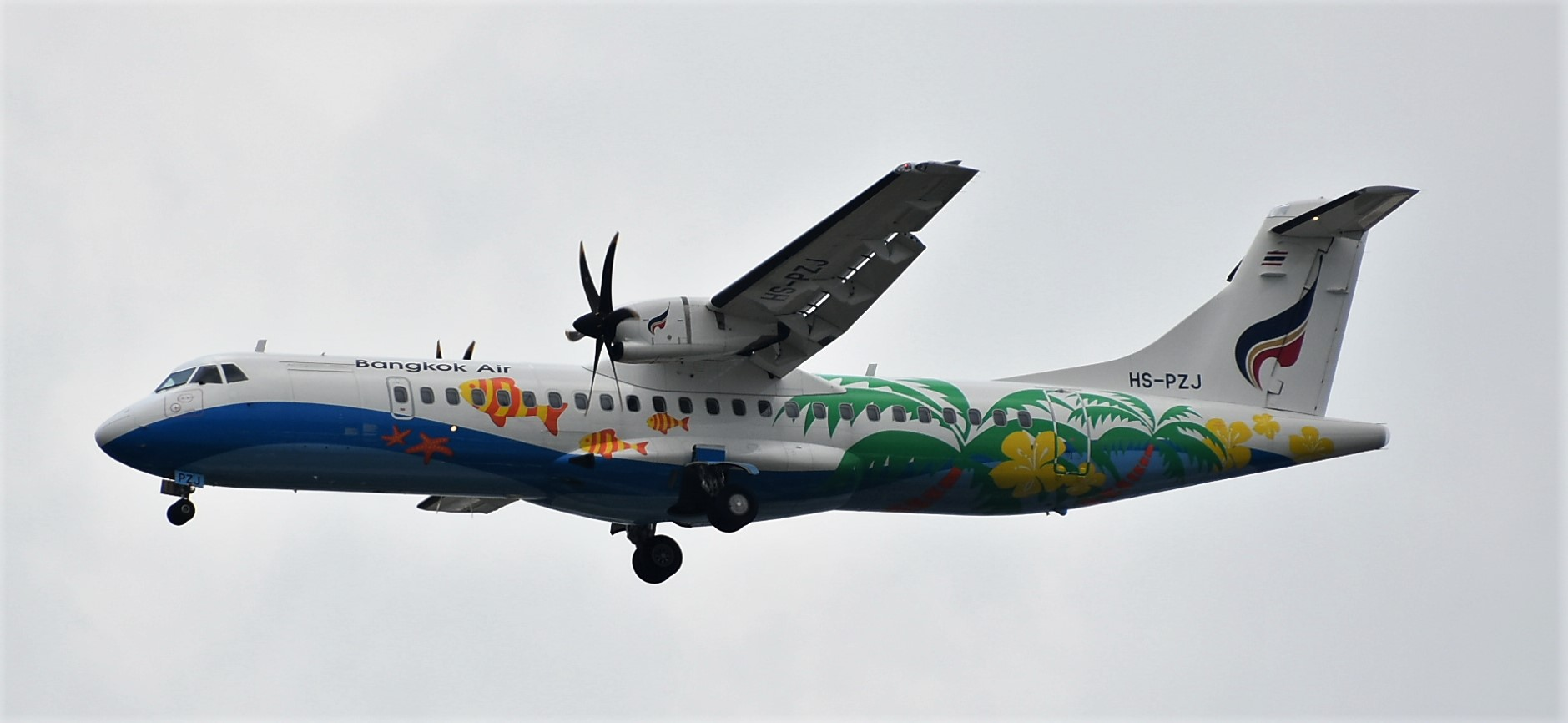
A Bangkok Airways ATR 72-600

=== Current fleet ===
As of August 2025, Bangkok Airways operates the following aircraft:

Bangkok Airways fleet
Aircraft	In service	Orders	Passengers			Notes
Aircraft	In service	Orders	C	Y	Total	Notes
Airbus A319-100	11	—	12	108	120	
Airbus A319-100	11	—	—	144	144	
Airbus A320-200	2	—	—	162	162	
ATR 72-600	10	12	—	70	70	
Total	23	12				

=== Historic fleet ===
Bangkok Airways retired fleet
Aircraft	Total	Introduced	Retired	Notes
ATR 42-300	1	1997	2001	
ATR 72-200	8	1994	2006	
ATR 72-500	8	2002	2019	
ATR 72-500	1	2002	2009	HS-PGL crashed as Flight 266.
Boeing 717-200	4	2000	2009	
De Havilland Canada Dash 8-100	1	1989	1994	
De Havilland Canada Dash 8-100	1	1989	1990	HS-SKI crashed as Flight 125.
De Havilland Canada Dash 8-300	5	1990	1996	
Embraer EMB-110P2 Bandeirante	Unknown	Unknown	Unknown	
Fokker 100	1	1992	1993	
McDonnell Douglas MD-90-30	1	2008	2008	
Short 330-200	1	1992	1994	

== Airports owned ==
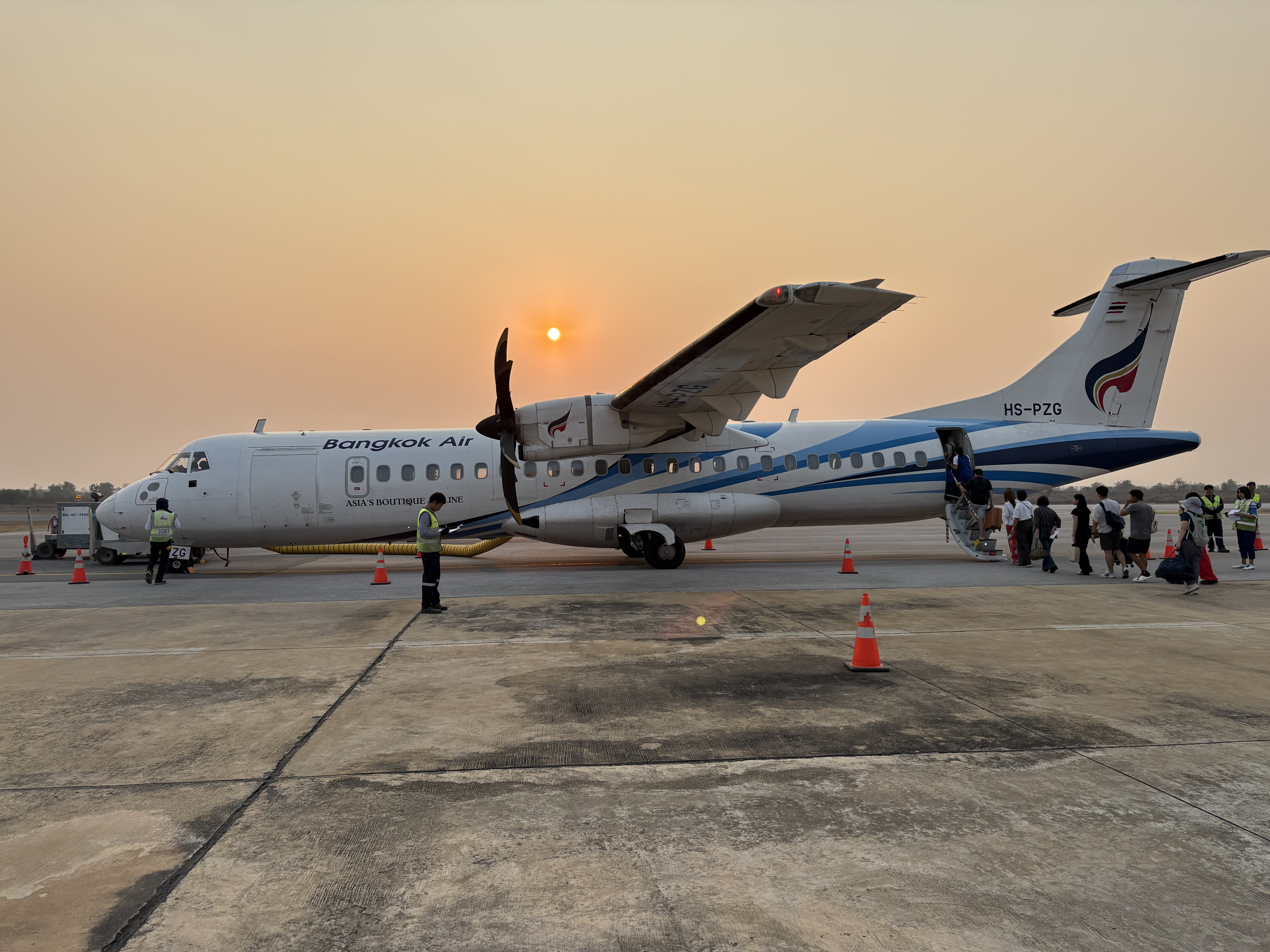
Passengers boarding a Bangkok Airways ATR 72-600 at Sukhothai Airport, one of its airports

Bangkok Airways owns and operates three airports:

- Samui Airport (25 April 1989 – present)
- Sukhothai Airport (12 April 1996 – present)
- Trat Airport (8 April 2003 – present)

== Award and recognition ==
On 24 June 2024, Bangkok Airways was voted 2024 Best Regional Airline in the World by Skytrax, for the 8th consecutive year running.

== Incidents and accidents ==
- On 7 December 1987, a Sahakol Air Hawker Siddeley HS 748 Series 2A (registration HS-THH), was damaged beyond repair after it overran the runway on landing at Udon Thani Airport with no fatalities.
- On 21 November 1990, a de Havilland Canada DHC-8-103 operating as Bangkok Airways Flight 125 crashed on Koh Samui while attempting to land in heavy rain and high winds. All 38 people on board perished.
- In August 2002 an ATR 72-200 skidded off the runway while landing at Siem Reap International Airport. There were no injuries. The airport was closed for two days.
- On 4 August 2009, Bangkok Airways Flight 266, operated by an ATR 72 between Krabi and Koh Samui, skidded off the runway, killing a captain. The 68 passengers were evacuated. Of the passengers evacuated, six sustained serious injuries while another four were treated for minor injuries.

== Sponsorship ==
Bangkok Airways is currently an official sponsor of Chiangrai United, Sukhothai FC, Chiang Mai FC, Trat FC, Lampang FC, Krabi FC, Kasetsart FC, Bangkok Christian College FC and Borussia Dortmund.
