= List of Scoot destinations =

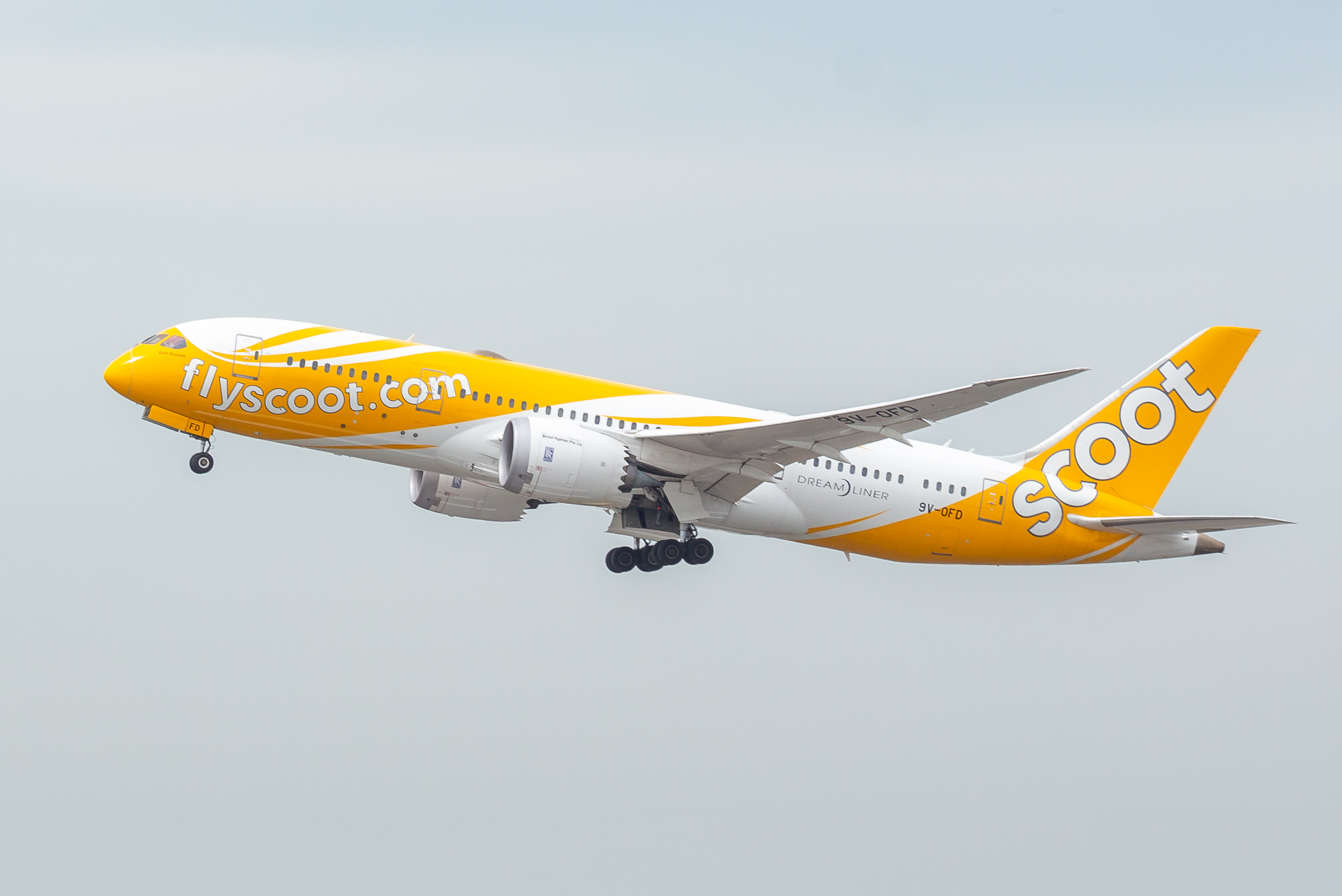
Scoot Boeing 787-8

Scoot is a low-cost airline based in Singapore, and is a subsidiary of Singapore Airlines. It launched flights in 2012 and mainly operates on medium and long-haul routes. Following its merger with Tigerair in July 2017, Scoot has expanded its reach and now operates many of Tigerair's routes. The following destinations are served or planned:

Country with most destinations served is China with 15, Indonesia with 12 and India with six.

== List ==
Country	City	Airport	Notes	Refs
Australia	Gold Coast	Gold Coast Airport	Terminated	
Australia	Melbourne	Melbourne Airport		
Australia	Perth	Perth Airport		
Australia	Sydney	Sydney Airport		
Austria	Vienna	Vienna International Airport		
Bangladesh	Dhaka	Hazrat Shahjalal International Airport	Terminated	
China	Changsha	Changsha Huanghua International Airport		
China	Dalian	Dalian Zhoushuizi International Airport	Terminated	
China	Fuzhou	Fuzhou Changle International Airport		
China	Guangzhou	Guangzhou Baiyun International Airport		
China	Haikou	Haikou Meilan International Airport		
China	Hangzhou	Hangzhou Xiaoshan International Airport		
China	Harbin	Harbin Taiping International Airport	Terminated	
China	Jieyang	Jieyang Chaoshan International Airport		
China	Jinan	Jinan Yaoqiang International Airport	Terminated	
China	Kunming	Kunming Changshui International Airport		
China	Nanchang	Nanchang Changbei International Airport	Terminated	
China	Nanjing	Nanjing Lukou International Airport		
China	Nanning	Nanning Wuxu International Airport		
China	Ningbo	Ningbo Lishe International Airport	Terminated	
China	Qingdao	Qingdao Jiaodong International Airport		
China	Qingdao	Qingdao Liuting International Airport	Airport closed	
China	Quanzhou	Quanzhou Jinjiang International Airport	Terminated	
China	Shenyang	Shenyang Taoxian International Airport		
China	Shenzhen	Shenzhen Bao'an International Airport	Terminated	
China	Tianjin	Tianjin Binhai International Airport		
China	Wuhan	Wuhan Tianhe International Airport		
China	Wuxi	Sunan Shuofang International Airport	Terminated	
China	Xi'an	Xi'an Xianyang International Airport		
China	Zhengzhou	Zhengzhou Xinzheng International Airport		
Germany	Berlin	Berlin Brandenburg Airport	Terminated	
Germany	Berlin	Berlin Tegel Airport	Airport closed	
Greece	Athens	Athens International Airport		
Hong Kong	Hong Kong	Hong Kong International Airport		
India	Amritsar	Sri Guru Ram Dass Jee International Airport		
India	Bangalore	Kempegowda International Airport	Terminated	
India	Chennai	Chennai International Airport		
India	Coimbatore	Coimbatore International Airport		
India	Hyderabad	Rajiv Gandhi International Airport	Terminated	
India	Jaipur	Jaipur International Airport	Terminated	
India	Kochi	Cochin International Airport	Terminated	
India	Lucknow	Chaudhary Charan Singh International Airport	Terminated	
India	Thiruvananthapuram	Thiruvananthapuram International Airport		
India	Tiruchirapalli	Tiruchirapalli Airport		
India	Visakhapatnam	Alluri Sitarama Raju International Airport		
Indonesia	Balikpapan	Sultan Aji Muhammad Sulaiman Sepinggan Airport		
Indonesia	Bandung	Kertajati International Airport		
Indonesia	Denpasar	Ngurah Rai International Airport		
Indonesia	Jakarta	Soekarno–Hatta International Airport		
Indonesia	Labuan Bajo	Komodo International Airport		
Indonesia	Lombok	Lombok International Airport		
Indonesia	Makassar	Sultan Hasanuddin International Airport		
Indonesia	Manado	Sam Ratulangi International Airport		
Indonesia	Medan	Kualanamu International Airport		
Indonesia	Padang	Minangkabau International Airport		
Indonesia	Palembang	Sultan Mahmud Badaruddin II International Airport		
Indonesia	Pekanbaru	Sultan Syarif Kasim II International Airport		
Indonesia	Pontianak	Supadio International Airport		
Indonesia	Semarang	Jenderal Ahmad Yani International Airport		
Indonesia	Surabaya	Juanda International Airport		
Indonesia	Tanjung Pandan	H.A.S. Hanandjoeddin International Airport		
Indonesia	Yogyakarta	Yogyakarta International Airport		
Japan	Okinawa	Naha Airport		
Japan	Osaka	Kansai International Airport		
Japan	Sapporo	New Chitose Airport		
Japan	Tokyo	Haneda Airport		
Japan	Tokyo	Narita International Airport		
Laos	Luang Prabang	Luang Prabang International Airport	Terminated	
Laos	Vientiane	Vientiane International Airport		
Macau	Macau	Macau International Airport		
Malaysia	Ipoh	Sultan Azlan Shah Airport		
Malaysia	Kota Bharu	Sultan Ismail Petra Airport		
Malaysia	Kota Kinabalu	Kota Kinabalu International Airport		
Malaysia	Kuala Lumpur	Kuala Lumpur International Airport		
Malaysia	Kuala Lumpur	Sultan Abdul Aziz Shah Airport		
Malaysia	Kuantan	Sultan Haji Ahmad Shah Airport		
Malaysia	Kuching	Kuching International Airport		
Malaysia	Langkawi	Langkawi International Airport		
Malaysia	Malacca	Malacca International Airport		
Malaysia	Miri	Miri Airport		
Malaysia	Penang	Penang International Airport		
Malaysia	Sibu	Sibu Airport		
Maldives	Malé	Velana International Airport	Terminated	
Myanmar	Yangon	Yangon International Airport	Terminated	
Philippines	Cebu	Mactan–Cebu International Airport		
Philippines	Clark	Clark International Airport		
Philippines	Davao	Francisco Bangoy International Airport		
Philippines	Iloilo	Iloilo International Airport		
Philippines	Kalibo	Kalibo International Airport	Terminated	
Philippines	Manila	Ninoy Aquino International Airport		
Saudi Arabia	Jeddah	King Abdulaziz International Airport		
Singapore	Singapore	Changi Airport	Hub	
South Korea	Jeju	Jeju International Airport		
South Korea	Seoul	Incheon International Airport		
Taiwan	Kaohsiung	Kaohsiung International Airport	Terminated	
Taiwan	Taipei	Taoyuan International Airport	Focus city	
Thailand	Bangkok	Don Mueang International Airport	Terminated	
Thailand	Bangkok	Suvarnabhumi Airport		
Thailand	Chiang Mai	Chiang Mai International Airport		
Thailand	Chiang Rai	Chiang Rai International Airport		
Thailand	Hat Yai	Hat Yai International Airport		
Thailand	Koh Samui	Samui Airport		
Thailand	Krabi	Krabi International Airport		
Thailand	Phuket	Phuket International Airport		
United Kingdom	London	Gatwick Airport	Terminated	
United States	Honolulu	Daniel K. Inouye International Airport	Terminated	
Vietnam	Da Nang	Da Nang International Airport		
Vietnam	Hanoi	Noi Bai International Airport		
Vietnam	Ho Chi Minh City	Tan Son Nhat International Airport		
Vietnam	Nha Trang	Cam Ranh International Airport		
Vietnam	Phú Quốc	Phu Quoc International Airport		
