= Thai Smile =

Regional airline of Thailand (2011–2023)

THAI Smile Airways บริษัท ไทยสมายล์แอร์เวย์ จำกัด

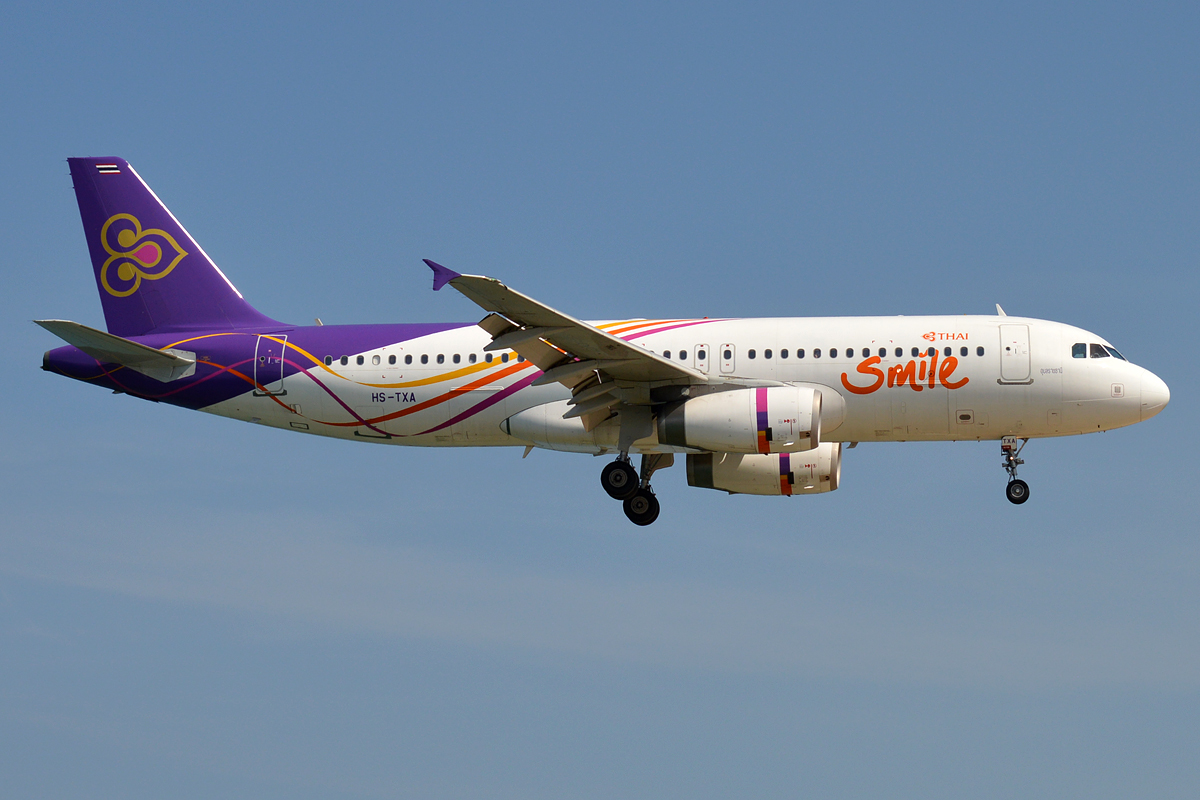
- Thai Smile Airbus A320-200 in 2019
| IATA | ICAO | Call sign |
|---|---|---|
| WE | THD | THAI SMILE |
- Founded: 19 August 2011 (as Thai Wings)
- Commenced operations: 7 July 2012 (as Thai Smile)
- Ceased operations: 31 December 2023 (re-integrated into Thai Airways International)
- AOC #: AOC.0007
- Hubs: Bangkok–Suvarnabhumi
- Focus cities: Chiang Mai
- Frequent-flyer program: Royal Orchid Plus
- Alliance: Star Alliance (affiliate; Connecting Partner)
- Fleet size: 20
- Parent company: Thai Airways International (100%)
- Headquarters: 89 Vibhavadi Rangsit Road, Chatuchak, Bangkok 10900, Thailand
- Key people: Viset Sontichai (CEO)
- Website: www.thaismileair.com

THAI Smile Airways was a Thai regional airline and a wholly owned subsidiary of Thai Airways International headquartered in Bangkok. It merged into Thai Airways International on 31 December 2023. The full cessation of operations was fully effective on January 1, 2024.

== History ==
On 20 May 2011, the Thai Airways board announced plans to create a new lower-cost airline, at the time dubbed Thai Wings. The creation of the airline was announced by Ampon Kittiampon, the chairman of Thai's board of directors, on 19 August 2011. It began operations in July 2012. According to Ampon, THAI Smile was intended to serve the market gap between low-cost carriers and full service airlines. The name THAI Smile was chosen from a pool of 2,229 entries in a contest to name the airline. According to an official at Thai Airways, THAI Smile was planned to begin showing an annual profit of about five million baht within two years of the start of operations.

In February 2023, it was reported that Thai Smile would be dissolved as a separate entity and merged with its parent company, Thai Airways International, by mid-2024 in an effort to reduce losses. On 18 May 2023, Thai Airways announced that Thai Smile would be merged into its parent as part of the group's post-COVID reconstruction process by the end of 2023. Thai Smile was set to cease all operations on 31 December 2023.

== Corporate affairs ==
Thai Smile Airways was an official sponsor of Thai Honda Ladkrabang and Ratchaburi Mitr Phol.

== Destinations ==
As of 2023, Thai Smile flew to the following destinations. The airline served only domestic destinations before ceasing operations on 31 December 2023.

| Country/territory | City/region | Airport | Notes | Refs |
|---|---|---|---|---|
| Bangladesh | Chittagong | Shah Amanat International Airport | Terminated | |
| Cambodia | Phnom Penh | Phnom Penh International Airport | Terminated | |
| Cambodia | Siem Reap | Siem Reap International Airport | Airport closed | |
| Cambodia | Siem Reap | Siem Reap–Angkor International Airport | Terminated | |
| China | Changsha | Changsha Huanghua International Airport | Terminated | |
| China | Chongqing | Chongqing Jiangbei International Airport | Terminated | |
| China | Kunming | Kunming Changshui International Airport | Terminated | |
| China | Xiamen | Xiamen Gaoqi International Airport | Terminated | |
| China | Zhengzhou | Zhengzhou Xinzheng International Airport | Terminated | |
| Hong Kong | | Hong Kong International Airport | Terminated | |
| India | Ahmedabad | Ahmedabad Airport | Terminated | |
| India | Delhi | Indira Gandhi International Airport | Terminated | |
| India | Gaya | Gaya Airport | Terminated | |
| India | Hyderabad | Rajiv Gandhi International Airport | Terminated | |
| India | Jaipur | Jaipur International Airport | Terminated | |
| India | Kolkata | Netaji Subhas Chandra Bose International Airport | Terminated | |
| India | Lucknow | Chaudhary Charan Singh International Airport | Terminated | |
| India | Mumbai | Chhatrapati Shivaji Maharaj International Airport | Terminated | |
| India | Varanasi | Lal Bahadur Shastri Airport | Terminated | |
| Indonesia | Jakarta | Soekarno–Hatta International Airport | Terminated | |
| Laos | Luang Prabang | Luang Prabang International Airport | Terminated | |
| Laos | Vientiane | Wattay International Airport | Terminated | |
| Macau | | Macau International Airport | Terminated | |
| Malaysia | Kota Kinabalu | Kota Kinabalu International Airport | Terminated | |
| Malaysia | Kuala Lumpur | Kuala Lumpur International Airport | Terminated | |
| Malaysia | Penang | Penang International Airport | Terminated | |
| Myanmar | Mandalay | Mandalay International Airport | Terminated | |
| Myanmar | Yangon | Yangon International Airport | Terminated | |
| Nepal | Kathmandu | Tribhuvan International Airport | Terminated | |
| Singapore | | Changi Airport | Terminated | |
| Sri Lanka | Colombo | Bandaranaike International Airport | Terminated | |
| Taiwan | Kaohsiung | Kaohsiung International Airport | Terminated | |
| Taiwan | Taipei | Taiwan Taoyuan International Airport | Terminated | |
| Thailand | Bangkok | Don Mueang International Airport | Terminated | |
| Thailand | Bangkok | Suvarnabhumi Airport | Hub | |
| Thailand | Chiang Mai | Chiang Mai International Airport | Terminated | |
| Thailand | Chiang Rai | Mae Fah Luang - Chiang Rai International Airport | Terminated | |
| Thailand | Hat Yai | Hat Yai International Airport | | |
| Thailand | Khon Kaen | Khon Kaen Airport | | |
| Thailand | Krabi | Krabi International Airport | | |
| Thailand | Loei | Loei Airport | Terminated | |
| Thailand | Nakhon Si Thammarat | Nakhon Si Thammarat Airport | Terminated | |
| Thailand | Nan | Nan Nakhon Airport | Terminated | |
| Thailand | Narathiwat | Narathiwat Airport | | |
| Thailand | Phuket | Phuket International Airport | Terminated | |
| Thailand | Roi Et | Roi Et Airport | Terminated | |
| Thailand | Surat Thani | Surat Thani International Airport | Terminated | |
| Thailand | Trang | Trang Airport | Terminated | |
| Thailand | Ubon Ratchathani | Ubon Ratchathani Airport | | |
| Thailand | Udon Thani | Udon Thani International Airport | Terminated | |
| Vietnam | Hanoi | Noi Bai International Airport | Terminated | |
| Vietnam | Ho Chi Minh City | Tan Son Nhat International Airport | Terminated | |

== Fleet ==
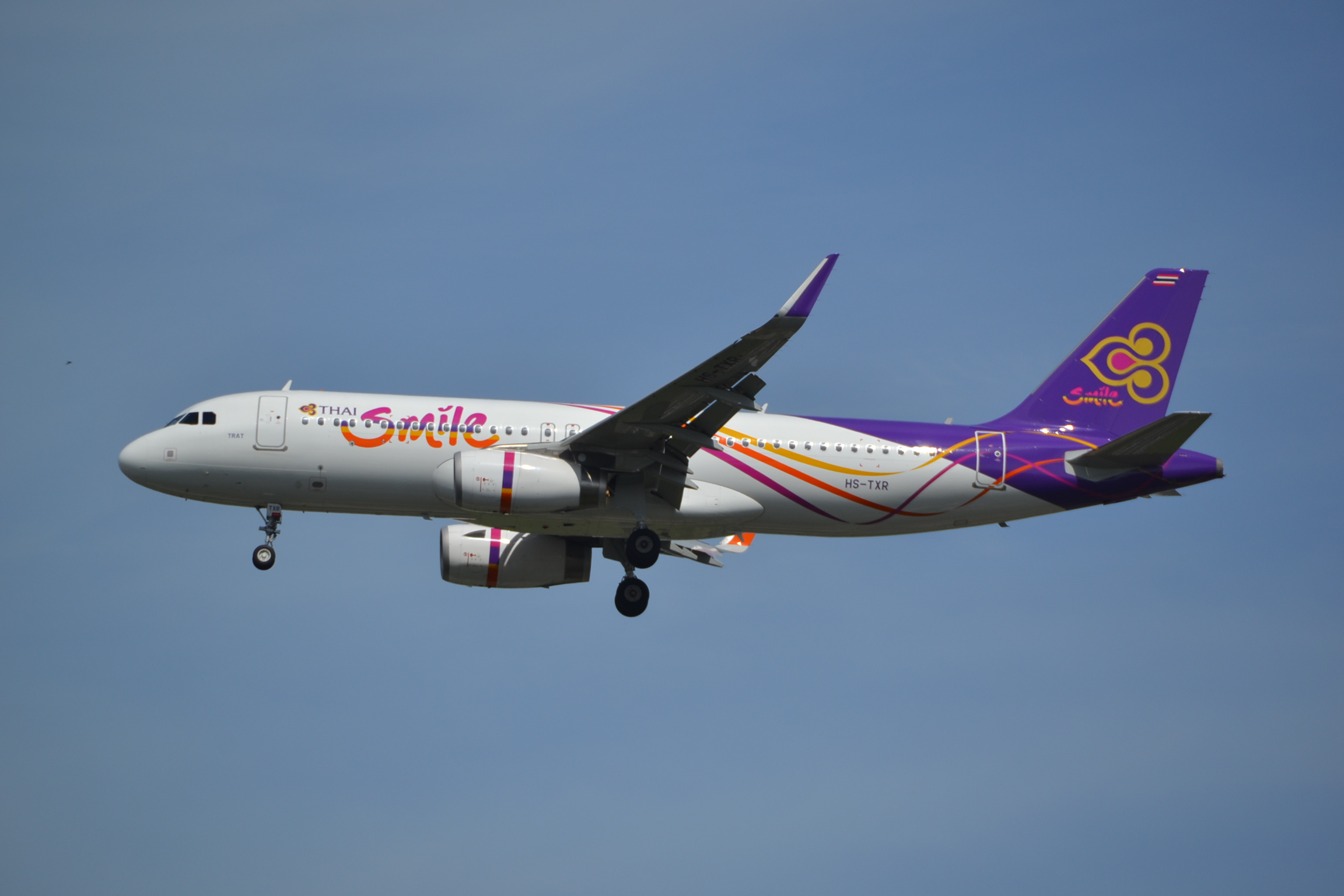
Thai Smile Airbus A320-200

As of 2023, THAI Smile operated the following aircraft:

| Aircraft | In service | Orders | Passengers | | | Note |
| Aircraft | In service | Orders | U | Y | Total | Note |
|---|---|---|---|---|---|---|
| Airbus A320-200 | 6 | — | 12 | 156 | 168 | Transferred to Thai Airways International. |
| Airbus A320-200 | 14 | — | 12 | 150 | 162 | Transferred to Thai Airways International. |
| Total | 12 | | | | | |
