= Singha Chiangrai Stadium =

Stadium in Thailand

- "Beetles' Nest"
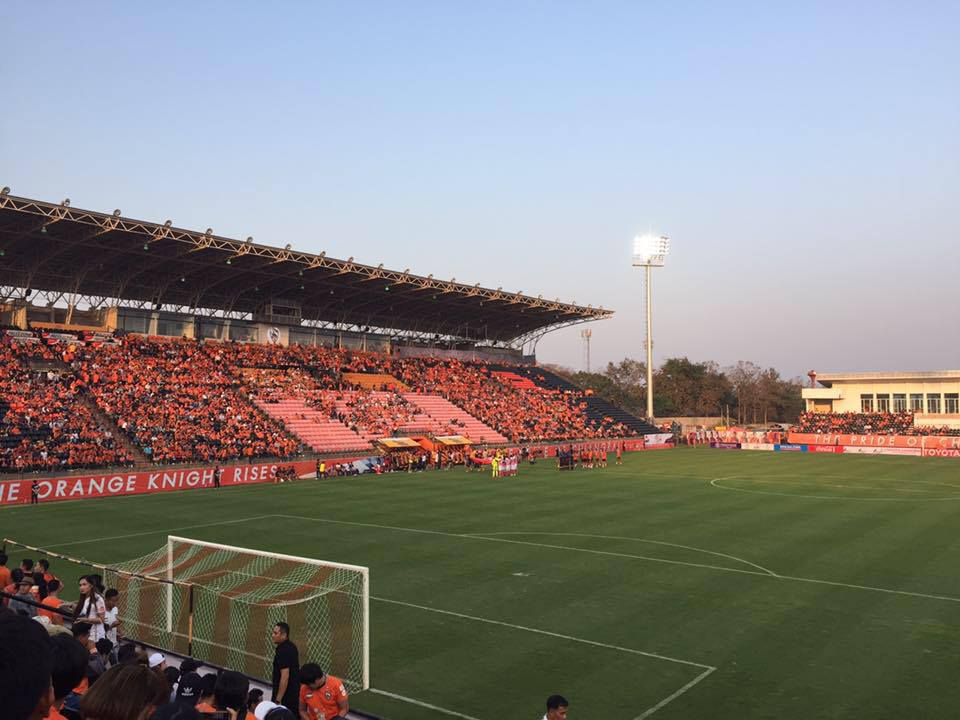
- Interactive map of Singha Chiangrai Stadium
- Full name: Singha Chiangrai Stadium
- Former names: United Stadium of Chiang Rai; Singha Stadium
- Location: Ban Du, Mueang Chiang Rai, Chiang Rai, Thailand
- Coordinates: 19°57′25″N 99°52′29″E
- Owner: Chiangrai United
- Operator: Chiangrai United
- Capacity: 12,000
- Surface: Grass

Construction
- Built: 2009
- Opened: 7 July 2012

Tenant
- Chiangrai United (2012-present)

Singha Chiangrai Stadium (Thai: สิงห์ เชียงราย สเตเดียม) is a Football stadium in Ban Du, Mueang Chiang Rai, Chiang Rai Province, Thailand. It is currently used mostly for football matches and is the home stadium of Leo Chiang Rai United. The stadium has a capacity of 12,000 people and is located near Mae Fah Luang International Airport.

== Name ==
The name of the ground changed due to sponsorship agreements, the first time it was changed from the original name, United Stadium of Chiangrai, to Singha Stadium following the sponsorship in 2017. However, the stadium is still referred as its original name of the United Stadium of Chiang Rai in AFC competitions.

On 15 October 2021, Thai League Co., Ltd approves the request made by Chiangrai United to change their club name from Singha Chiangrai United to Leo Chiangrai United and their stadium's name from Singha Stadium, to Leo Chiangrai Stadium, which the changes will be applied from 17 October 2021 onwards. Later, the named changed into Singha Chiangrai Stadium.
