= Thai Airways Company =

Domestic airline of Thailand (1951–1988)

Thai Airways
IATA	ICAO	Call sign
TH	TAC	THAI AIR
- Founded: 1 November 1951; 74 years ago (amalgamation of Siamese Airways and Pacific Overseas Airline)
- Ceased operations: 1 April 1988; 38 years ago (merged into Thai International)
- Hubs: Bangkok–Don Mueang
- Focus cities: Chiang Mai; Hat Yai
- Parent company: Thai Airways International
- Headquarters: Pom Prap Sattru Phai, Bangkok, Thailand

Thai Airways Company or Thai Airways (TAC; Thai: เดินอากาศไทย) was the domestic flag carrier of Thailand. Its main base was the domestic terminal (Terminal 3) at Don Mueang International Airport (then known as Bangkok International Airport). Its head office was located in Pom Prap Sattru Phai, Bangkok. In 1988, Thai Airways was merged to become Thai Airways International (Thai: การบินไทย).

== History ==
Thai Airways traces its roots to the Siamese Airways Company Limited, the domestic flag carrier of Thailand formed on 1 March 1947 by a cabinet resolution. The fleet initially consisted of Douglas DC-3, Beechcraft C-45, L-5 Sentinel, Rearwin and Fairchild aircraft. The inaugural flight was Bangkok-Phitsanulok-Lampang-Chiang Mai and a Chiang Mai-Mae Sariang-Mae Hong Son service began two days later. The first international flight, a Bangkok-Songkhla-Penang service, took place in December 1947.

Siamese Airways merged with Pacific Overseas Airlines (Siam) (POAS), to form Thai Airways Company Limited (TAC) (Thai: บริษัท เดินอากาศไทย จำกัด (บดท)) - commonly Thai Airways, following a government resolution on 1 November 1951.

In 1960, Thai Airways established the international flag carrier, Thai Airways International Company Limited (THAI; Thai: บริษัท การบินไทย จำกัด). The international carrier was a joint venture between Scandinavian Airlines System (SAS) with the Scandinavian carrier initially providing a 30% share capital of two million baht.

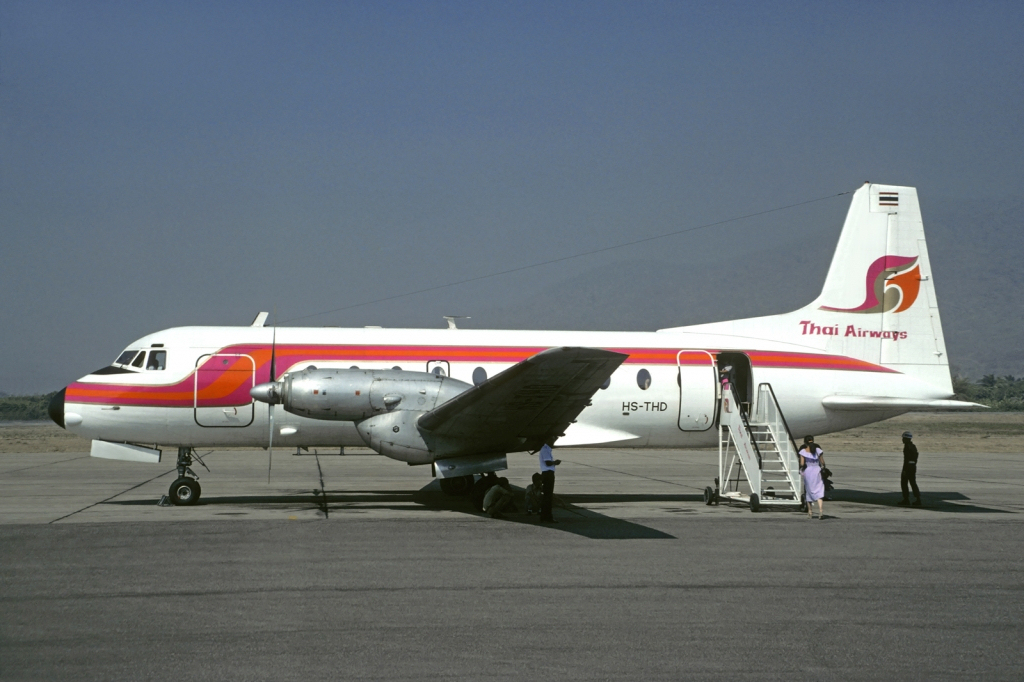
Hawker Siddeley 748 of Thai Airways at Chiang Mai International Airport in 1979

Thai Airways acquired an Avro 748 turboprop in 1963, a Boeing 737-200 jet in 1977, a Short 330 in 1982, and Short 360 and Airbus A310-200 in 1985.

On 1 April 1988, Thai Airways Company Limited (TAC) merged with Thai Airways International to create the unitary national airline of the Kingdom of Thailand, under a cabinet resolution and direction of the Prime Minister, General Prem Tinsulanonda.

Thai Airways's 11 aircraft, comprising three Boeing 737-200, four Short 330, two Short 360 and two Airbus A310-200, combined fleet with Thai Airways International, for a total of 41 aircraft. Airline codes changed to Thai Airways International's airline codes at the end of 1988.

== Destinations ==
Domestic Destinations of Thailand:

from/to Bangkok – Don Mueang International Airport

- Chiang Mai – Chiang Mai International Airport
- Chiang Rai – Old Chiang Rai Airport
- Hat Yai – Hat Yai International Airport (formerly destination as Songkhla)
- Khon Kaen – Khon Kaen Airport
- Lampang – Lampang Airport
- Phitsanulok / Uttaradit – Phitsanulok Airport
- Phuket – Phuket International Airport
- Nakhon Sawan – Nakhon Sawan Airport
- Nakhon Si Thammarat – Cha-ian Airport
- Sakon Nakhon – Sakon Nakhon Airport
- Surat Thani – Surat Thani International Airport
- Surin – Surin Airport
- Trang – Trang Airport
- Ubon Ratchathani – Ubon Ratchathani Airport
- Udon Thani – Udon Thani International Airport

from/to Chiang Mai – Chiang Mai International Airport

- Chiang Rai – Old Chiang Rai Airport
- Mae Hong Son – Mae Hong Son Airport
- Mae Sariang – Mae Sariang Airport
- Mae Sot – Mae Sot Airport
- Nan – Nan Nakhon Airport

from/to Hat Yai – Hat Yai International Airport (formerly destination as Songkhla)

- Phuket – Phuket International Airport
- Pattani – Pattani Airport
- Narathiwat – Narathiwat Airport

International Destinations:

- Wattay International Airport, Vientiane, Laos
- Penang International Airport, Penang, Malaysia
- Subang International Airport, Kuala Lumpur, Malaysia
- Noi Bai International Airport, Hanoi, Vietnam

== Fleet ==
- 2 Airbus A310-200
- 3 Avro 748
- 2 Beechcraft C-45
- 4 Beechcraft Bonanza 35
- 1 Bell 206
- 5 Boeing 737-200
- 1 Consolidated Canso A
- 1 Consolidated PBY-5A Catalina
- 10 Douglas DC-3
- 3 Douglas DC-4
- 1 Fairchild 24W40
- 9 Hawker Siddeley HS 748
- 3 Lockheed L-1049G Super Constellation
- 5 Noorduyn UC-64A Norseman
- 2 Rearwin
- 1 Piper PA-23
- 4 Short 330
- 2 Short 360
- 6 Stinson L-5 Sentinel

== Incidents and accidents ==
- 25 December 1967: Flight 002, a Douglas C-47A (HS-TDH), crashed at Chiang Mai International Airport due to pilot error, killing 4 out of 31 passengers and crew on board.
- 21 January 1968: At 10000 feet over Damnoen Saduak District, Ratchaburi Province, a Thai Airways Sud Caravelle IA (HS-TGL) collided with Royal Thai Air Force Beechcraft Queen Air 02018 that was photographing the Caravelle in flight; the Baron lost control and crashed, killing all six on board, but the Caravelle landed safely at Bangkok.
- 7 May 1971: A Thai Airways Douglas C-47A (HS-TDE) undershot the runway at Mae Hong Son Airport, landing hard and bouncing in the process, after which it veered off the runway and turned around; all 21 on board survived, but the aircraft was written off.
- 27 April 1980: Flight 231, a Hawker Siddeley HS 748 en route from Khon Kaen to Bangkok, lost altitude during a thunderstorm and crashed about 8 miles from Don Mueang International Airport. All four crew members and 40 of the 49 passengers were killed.
- 21 June 1980: A Thai Airways Hawker Siddeley HS 748 (HS-THG) overran the runway on takeoff at Chiang Rai Airport after failing to get airborne; all 21 on board survived, but the aircraft was written off.
- 15 April 1985: A Thai Airways Boeing 737-200 (HS-TBB) hit high ground on Phuket and was destroyed by the impact and subsequent fire. All four passengers and seven crew members were killed. The accident occurred after a failure of both engines was reported.
- 28 April 1987: A Thai Airways Hawker Siddeley HS 748 (HS-THI) made a wheels-up landing at Chiang Rai Airport after the co-pilot forgot to lower the landing gear; all 43 passengers and crew on board survived, but the aircraft was written off.
- 31 August 1987: Flight 365, a Boeing 737-200 (HS-TBC) flying from Hat Yai to Phuket, crashed into the sea off Phuket. All nine crew members and 74 passengers were killed.

== See also ==
- Thai Airways International
- Thai Smile
- Nok Air
- Don Mueang International Airport
