= Chiang Rai Airport =

Chiang Rai Airport may refer to either of two airports near Chiang Rai, Thailand:

- Chiang Rai International Airport (Mae Fah Luang International Airport), IATA: CEI, ICAO: VTCT
- Old Chiang Rai Airport (no longer operational), IATA: N/A, ICAO: VTCR
