= Thai Airways Flight 365 =

1987 aviation accident

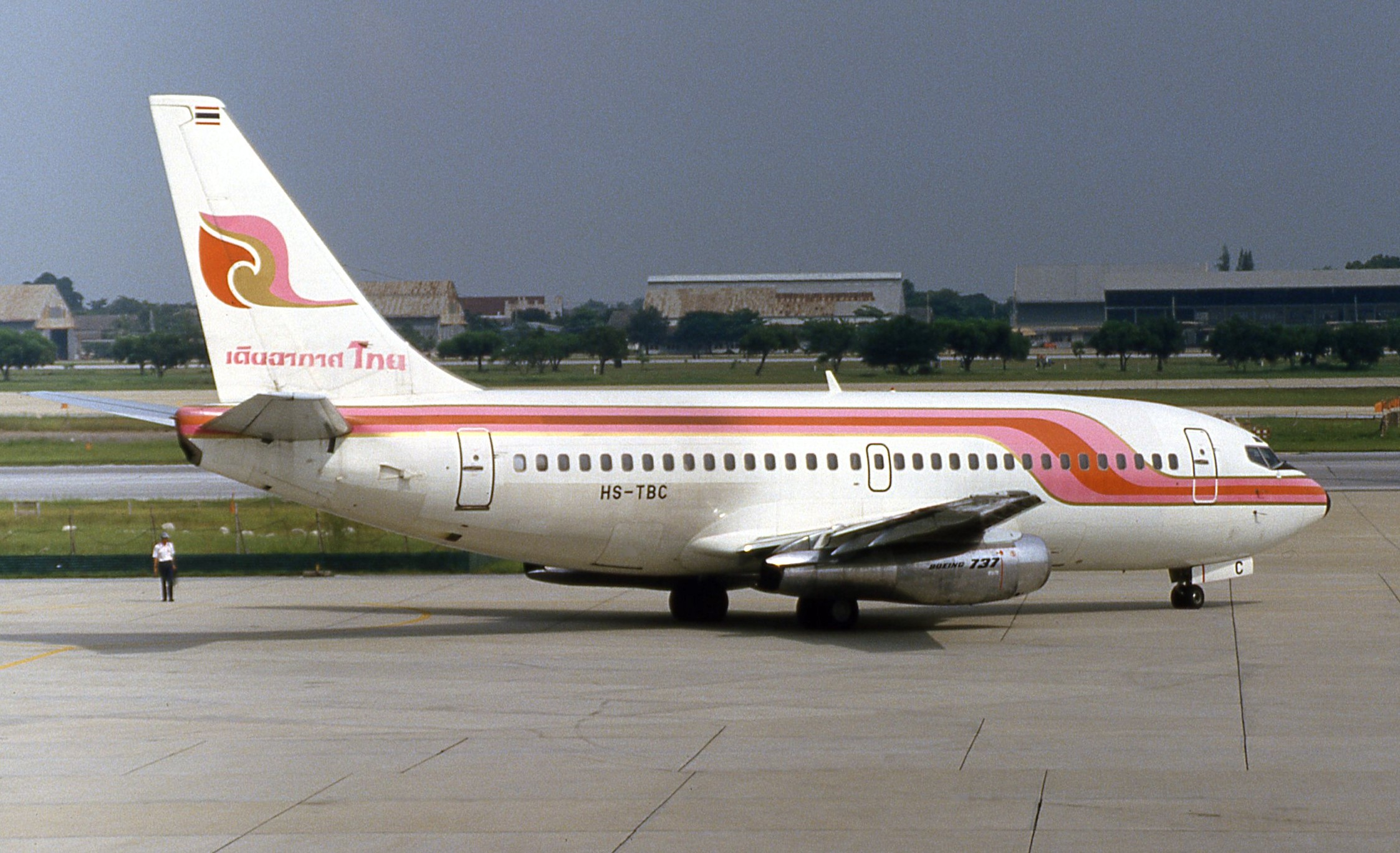
- HS-TBC, the aircraft involved in the accident, seen in 1986.

Occurrence
- Date: 31 August 1987
- Summary: Pilot error; ATC error
- Site: Andaman Sea, near Thalang district, Off Phuket International Airport, Ko Phuket, Thailand; 8°7′40″N 98°28′16″E

Aircraft
- Aircraft type: Boeing 737-2P5
- Operator: Thai Airways
- Call sign: THAI AIR 365
- Registration: HS-TBC
- Flight origin: Hat Yai International Airport
- Destination: Phuket International Airport
- Occupants: 83
- Passengers: 74
- Crew: 9
- Fatalities: 83
- Survivors: 0

Thai Airways Flight 365 was a Thai Airways Company Boeing 737-200 with the registration number HS-TBC. On 31 August 1987, the plane crashed during a scheduled flight from Hat Yai International Airport to Phuket International Airport (both in Thailand), killing all 83 people on board: 74 passengers and 9 crew. It was the deadliest aviation accident in Thailand at the time, before being surpassed four years later by the crash of Lauda Air Flight 004. Concerned by another aircraft in their vicinity, the crew reduced their approach speed while attempting to land, and failed to recover from an aerodynamic stall. In addition to pilot error, the air traffic controller was blamed for failing to keep Flight 365 and the other aircraft adequately separated.

== Aircraft and crew ==
The aircraft involved was a Boeing 737-200 with the aircraft registration number HS-TBC and plant number 22267/685. It was built in 1980 and was delivered to Thai Airways in the same year. The aircraft had no history of malfunctioning. At the time of the crash, the aircraft was seven years and one month old and had 16,963 flying hours.

The captain was 53-year-old Vishanet Ampawat, who had logged a total of 19,538 flight hours, including 5,576 hours on the Boeing 737. The unnamed 37-year-old first officer had 5,951 flight hours. He was far less experienced on the Boeing 737 than captain Ampawat, having logged only 156 hours on it.

== Crash ==
Weather conditions were good as Flight 365 approached Phuket International Airport. As they prepared to land, the flight crew of Flight 365 expressed concern about a Dragonair Boeing 737 that was also landing at the airport but behind and below their aircraft.

At 15:34 local time (08:34 UTC), the Dragonair captain told the air traffic controller that he was 24 kilometres (15 mi; 13 nmi) away from the airport at an altitude of 750 metres (2,460 ft) and that the Thai Airways aircraft was about 9 kilometres (5.6 mi; 4.9 nmi) in front of him. Because Dragonair's Boeing 737 was closer to the airport and flew at a lower altitude, it was the first to land. The Dragonair aircraft then turned right for the final approach to Runway 27. A few seconds later, the Thai pilots were given permission to drop to 1,000 metres (3,300 ft) and instructed to land second.

Immediately thereafter, the approach control was again called by the Thai crew, who stated that the position of the Dragonair flight was incorrect. The Thai pilots also told the air traffic controller that they were only 15 kilometres (9.3 mi; 8.1 nmi) away from the airport, even though their aircraft was further away at that time. The Thai aircraft was then given priority by the air traffic control at 15:36 for landing.

The captain of the Dragonair flight now warned the Thai crew of a possible collision because the Thai Boeing 737 would intercept its flight path. As a result, the Thai Airways crew reduced the aircraft's speed. A lapse in concentration by the flight crew occurred allowing the speed of Flight 365 to fall below the minimum limit. When the speed had dropped to 163 knots (302 km/h; 188 mph), the stick shaker activated. The aircraft slowed down for another ten seconds and then entered a stall a speed of 152 knots (282 km/h; 175 mph). In an attempt to recover from the stall, the captain increased engine power and retracted the landing gear. This failed as the aircraft was now at a low altitude. The plane crashed into the Andaman Sea 15 kilometres (9.3 mi; 8.1 nmi) east of the airport, and sank into a seabed that was 20 metres (66 ft) deep. Everyone on board the aircraft was killed.

== Investigation ==
The probable cause for the crash of Flight 365 was determined to be "The pilot slowed the aircraft and it stalled while the pilot prepared to land first as advised by Phuket approach control. It appears that he was worrying and not sure whether he was able to land first because the pilot of the second aircraft gave warning that the first aircraft was above him and could not descend passing through his level. The pilot added power and raised the gear after the stick shaker activated but couldn’t execute a recovery before hitting the sea." In addition to pilot error, the air traffic controller was blamed for failing to keep Flight 365 and the Dragonair 737 adequately separated.

In the aftermath of the incident, the two air traffic controllers involved in the incident were assigned to other positions.
