= Thai VietJet Air =

Low-cost airline of Thailand

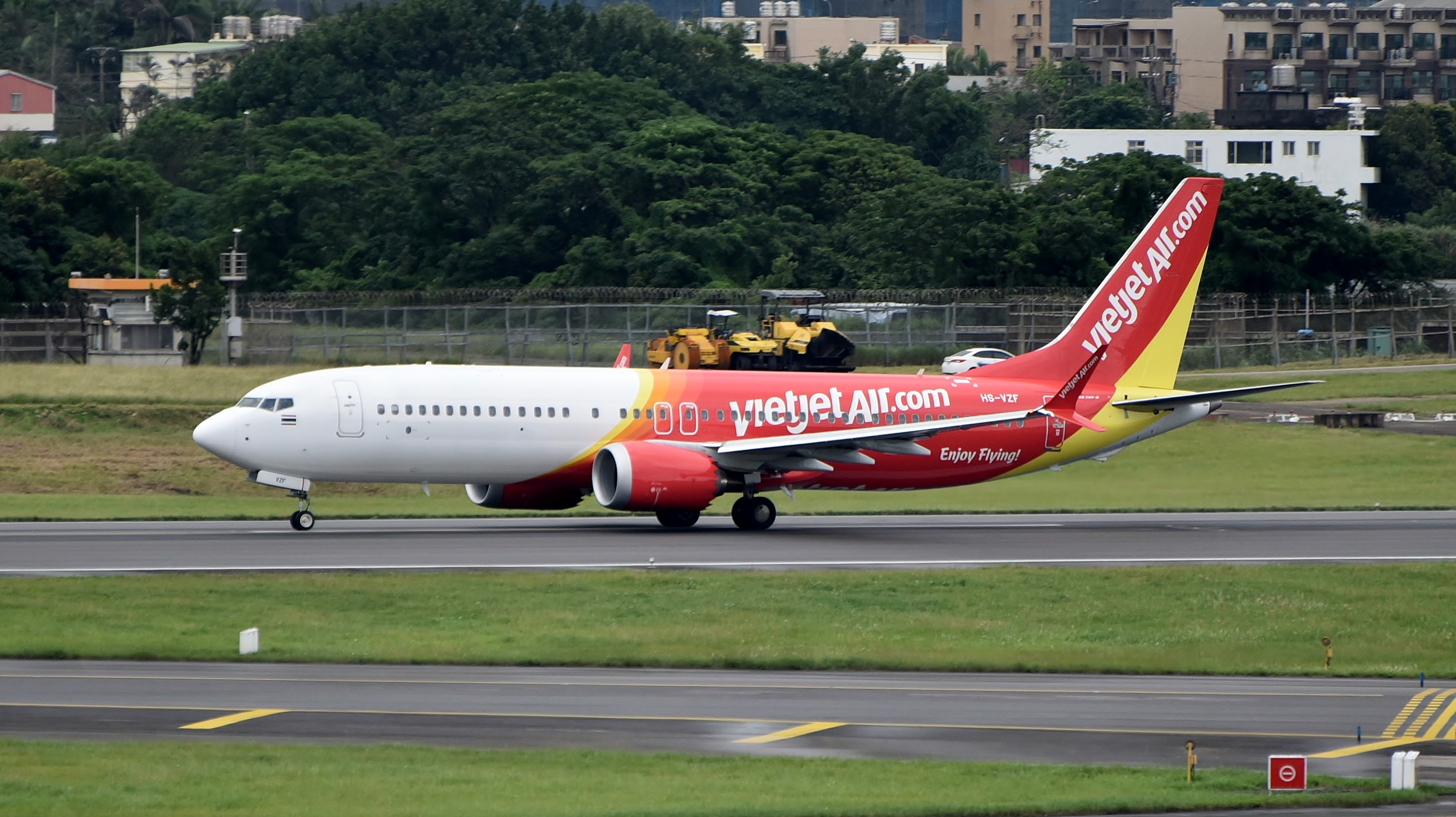
- Boeing 737 MAX 8 of Thai VietJet
IATA	ICAO	Call sign
VZ	TVJ	THAI VIETJET
- Founded: November 2014; 11 years ago
- Commenced operations: 25 March 2015; 11 years ago
- AOC #: AOC.0012
- Operating bases: Bangkok–Suvarnabhumi; Taipei–Taoyuan
- Frequent-flyer program: VietJet Skyclub
- Fleet size: 18
- Destinations: 29
- Parent company: VietJet Air
- Headquarters: Bang Phli, Samut Prakan, Thailand
- Key people: Woranate Laprabang (CEO)
- Website: www.vietjetair.com

An Airbus A321ceo of Thai VietJet Air departing from Khon Kaen Airport.

Thai Vietjet Air Joint Stock Co., Ltd., operating as Thai VietJet Air (TVJ; Thai: ไทยเวียดเจ็ทแอร์) or Vietjet Thailand, is a low-cost airline of Thailand and an associate company of Vietnamese VietJet Air.

== History ==
Thai VietJet Air received its Air Operator's Certificate in November 2014. The carrier commenced operations on 29 March 2015 from its operating base in Bangkok's Suvarnabhumi Airport to Phuket International Airport. The airline planned to launch services to Udon Thani later.

== Destinations ==
As of June 2024, Thai VietJet Air flies (or has flown) to the following destinations:

Country	City	Airport	Notes	Refs
Cambodia	Phnom Penh	Techo International Airport		
China	Beijing	Beijing Daxing International Airport		
China	Guangzhou	Guangzhou Baiyun International Airport		
China	Guilin	Guilin Liangjiang International Airport		
China	Shenyang	Shenyang Taoxian International Airport		
China	Zhangjiajie	Zhangjiajie Hehua Airport		
India	Ahmedabad	Sardar Vallabhbhai Patel International Airport		
India	Mumbai	Chhatrapati Shivaji Maharaj International Airport		
India	Kolkata	Netaji Subhas Chandra Bose International Airport		
Japan	Fukuoka	Fukuoka Airport		
Japan	Naha	Naha Airport		
Japan	Osaka	Kansai International Airport		
Japan	Sapporo	New Chitose Airport		
Japan	Tokyo	Narita International Airport		
Mongolia	Ulaanbaatar	Chinggis Khaan International Airport	Seasonal	
Singapore	Singapore	Changi Airport	Terminated	
Taiwan	Taipei	Taoyuan International Airport	Hub	
Thailand	Bangkok	Suvarnabhumi Airport	Hub	
Thailand	Chiang Mai	Chiang Mai International Airport	Hub	
Thailand	Chiang Rai	Chiang Rai International Airport		
Thailand	Hat Yai	Hat Yai International Airport		
Thailand	Khon Kaen	Khon Kaen Airport		
Thailand	Krabi	Krabi International Airport		
Thailand	Nakhon Si Thammarat	Nakhon Si Thammarat Airport		
Thailand	Pattaya	U-Tapao International Airport		
Thailand	Phuket	Phuket International Airport		
Thailand	Surat Thani	Surat Thani International Airport		
Thailand	Ubon Ratchathani	Ubon Ratchathani Airport		
Thailand	Udon Thani	Udon Thani International Airport		
Vietnam	Can Tho	Can Tho International Airport	Charter	
Vietnam	Da Lat	Lien Khuong Airport		
Vietnam	Da Nang	Da Nang International Airport		
Vietnam	Hanoi	Noi Bai International Airport		
Vietnam	Ho Chi Minh City	Tan Son Nhat International Airport		
Vietnam	Phu Quoc	Phu Quoc International Airport		

=== Airline partnerships ===
Thai VietJet Air besides having a codeshare partnership with its parent company VietJet Air it also has Interline partnerships with APG Airlines and Norse Atlantic.

== Fleet ==
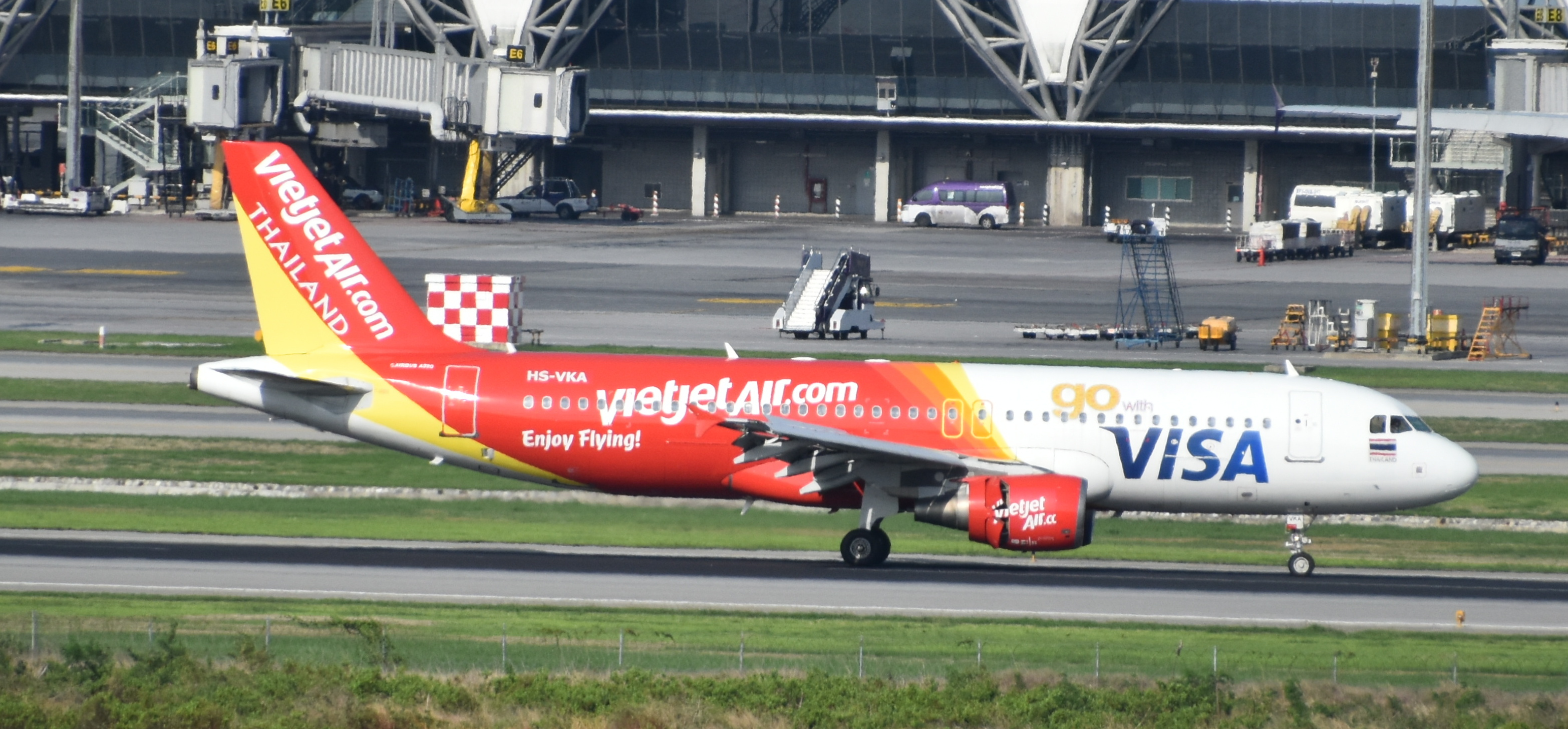
Thai VietJet Air Airbus A320-200

Thai VietJet Boeing 737 MAX 8. The type is planned to be the carrier's backbone in the future.

As of November 2025, Thai VietJet Air operates the following aircraft:

Thai Vietjet Air fleet
Aircraft	In service	Orders	Passengers	Notes
Airbus A320-200	12	—	180	To be phased out and replaced by Boeing 737 MAX 8.
Airbus A321-200	6	—	230	To be phased out and replaced by Boeing 737 MAX 8.
Boeing 737 MAX 8	8	42	189	Ordered by parent company. Deliveries start from 2026.
Total	26	42		

== See also ==
- VietJet Qazaqstan
