= Thai Airways Flight 231 =

1980 aviation accident

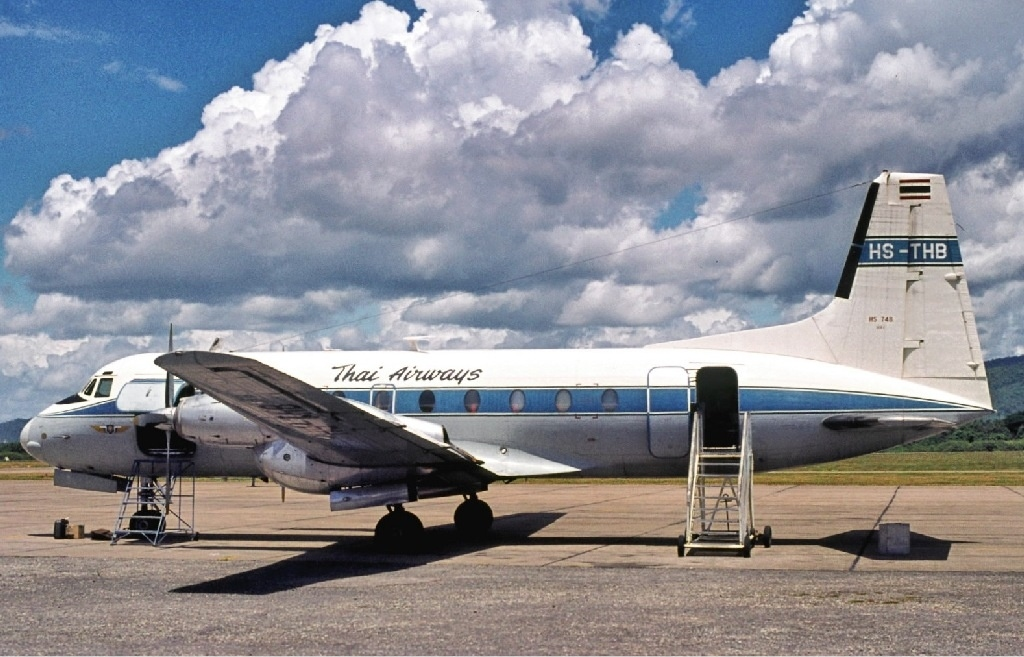
- HS-THB, aircraft involved in the accident, seen in 1976.

Accident
- Date: 27 April 1980
- Summary: Crashed on approach due to pilot error in thunderstorm
- Site: 15 km north east of Bangkok, Thailand

Aircraft
- Aircraft type: Hawker Siddeley HS 748
- Operator: Thai Airways
- Registration: HS-THB
- Flight origin: Khon Kaen Airport, Thailand
- Destination: Don Mueang International Airport, Bangkok, Thailand
- Passengers: 49
- Crew: 4
- Fatalities: 44
- Injuries: 9
- Survivors: 9

Thai Airways Flight 231 was a scheduled passenger flight that crashed on 27 April 1980. The Hawker Siddeley HS 748 operating the flight, registration HS-THB, stalled and crashed after entering a thunderstorm on approach to Bangkok. The accident killed 44 out of 53 passengers and crew on board.

== Aircraft and crew ==
The aircraft was a Hawker Siddeley HS-748 Series 2 with registration HS-THB, built in 1964 before being delivered to Thai Airways that same year. The plane had completed 12,791 flight hours at the time of the accident.

=== Status of the crew ===
Both the captain's and the copilot's medical certificates indicated that they wore corrective lenses, though no evidence was found that this affected the pilots' judgement.

== Accident ==
Flight 231 departed from Khon Kaen Airport around 5:50am local time and was expected to arrive at Don Mueang International Airport an hour later.

During the approach to Don Mueang while planning to land on runway 21R, the aircraft entered a severe thunderstorm. While descending past 1,500 feet, a sudden downdraft struck the plane, causing the nose to go up and the plane to stall.

Though the aircraft maintained altitude, it entered a nose dive 30 seconds later. It then banked slightly to the right and was almost out of the dive when it crashed into a paddy field, skidding for 510 feet and breaking up at 6:55am. The right wing separated from the fuselage and a fire started in the fuselage, which was later extinguished by the heavy rain.

Fire services were unable to enter the accident site as the ground was filled with water and mud. At 7:52am, an RTAF helicopter sighted the wreckage and survivors were rescued by two helicopters. The crash killed all 4 crew members and 40 of the passengers, with the other 9 survivors suffering serious injuries.

== Possible causes of the accident ==
The following causes may have led to the crash:

- The weather radar on board was not used.
- There was no change in the frequency ATIS Special Weather Report. The crew therefore received no information about the storm.
- The pilots believed that flying with radar vectors was safe and that air traffic control would not direct the aircraft into a storm.
- The pilots did not realize that there was a second storm in the approach beyond the one they observed.
