= Hua Hin Airport =

Airport in Hua Hin, Thailand

Hua Hin Airport ท่าอากาศยานหัวหิน
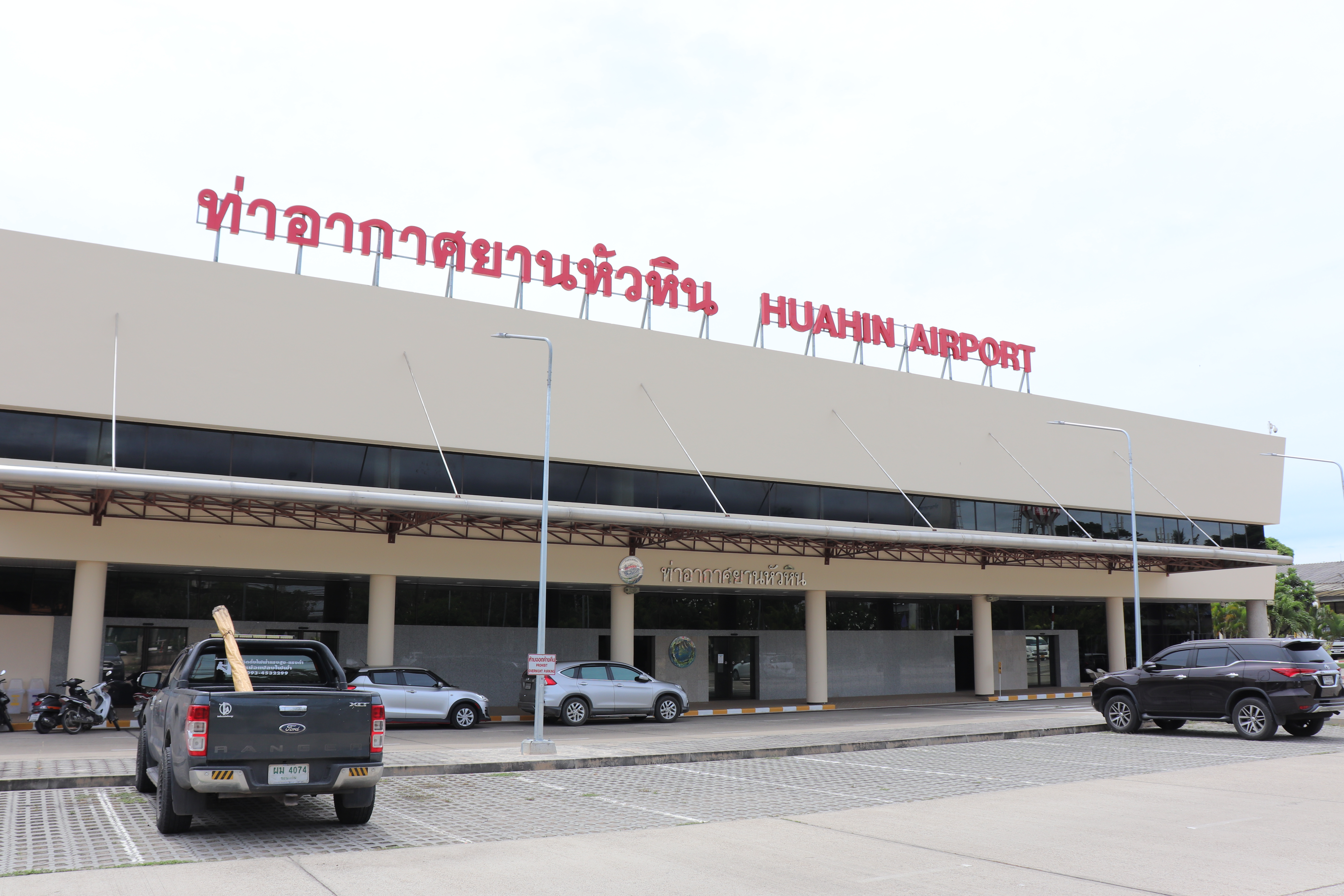
- IATA: HHQ; ICAO: VTPH

Summary
- Airport type: Public
- Operator: Department of Airports
- Serves: Prachuap Khiri Khan; Phetchaburi
- Location: Tambon Hua Hin, Amphoe Hua Hin, Prachuap Khiri Khan and Tambon Cha-am, Amphoe Cha-am, Phetchaburi, Thailand
- Opened: 3 February 1961; 65 years ago
- Elevation AMSL: 19 m (62 ft)
- Coordinates: 12°38′10″N 099°57′05″E
- Website: minisite.airports.go.th/huahin

Maps
- Location of airport in Thailand
- Interactive map of Hua Hin Airport

Runways
Direction	Length		Surface
Direction	m	ft	Surface
16/34	2,100	6,890	Asphalt

Statistics (2025)
- Passengers: 63,230 ▼
- Aircraft movements: 447 ▼
- Cargo (tonnes): -
- Sources: Department of Airports

Hua Hin Airport (IATA: HHQ, ICAO: VTPH) is an international airport serving Hua Hin, Thailand.

It is located in the provincial border between Tambon Hua Hin, Amphoe Hua Hin, Prachuap Khiri Khan province and Tambon Cha-am, Amphoe Cha-am, Phetchaburi province in Southern Thailand.

== Airport upgrade ==
In August 2018 the Department of Airports (DOA) announced that it will spend 3.5 billion baht to upgrade Hua Hin Airport over the next five years. The number of travellers using the airport is expected to increase by tenfold, to three million a year, in that timeframe. The upgrade is part of the "Riviera Thailand" and Southern Economic Corridor projects. The work at the airport will take four to five years. It includes enlarging the existing passenger terminal, building a second one, expanding hangar space, and widening the runway from 35 to 45 metres. The runway safety area is below ICAOs recommendation.

== Airlines and destinations ==
While Berjaya Air has previously operated flights from Kuala Lumpur–Subang, as of July 2026, Hua Hin does not serve any international flights.

Airlines	Destinations
EZY Airlines	Phuket, Hat Yai, Surat Thani
Thai AirAsia	Chiang Mai

== Accidents and incidents ==
A Royal Thai Police Aviation de Havilland Canada DHC-6 Twin Otter crashed after takeoff on 25 April 2025 after a test flight. All six aboard were killed: three crew and three passengers. The cause was ascribed to the failure of both engines.
