= Old Chiang Rai Airport =

Former airport northern Thailand (1926–1992)

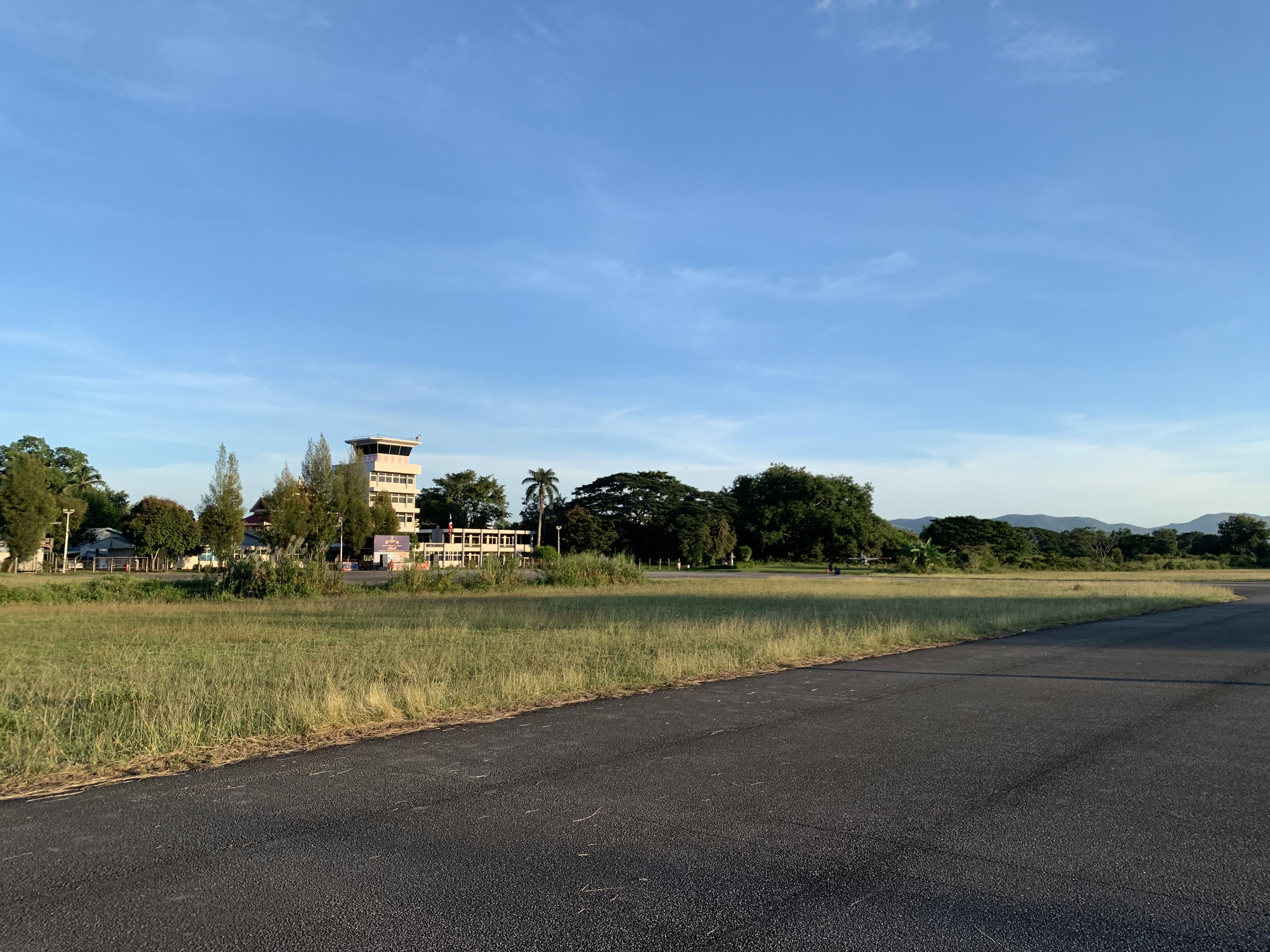
- The disused runway and building of the airport
- IATA: none; ICAO: VTCR

Summary
- Airport type: Public / Military
- Owner/Operator: Royal Thai Air Force
- Serves: Chiang Rai
- Location: Chiang Rai, Thailand
- Opened: 1926
- Closed: 5 August 1992
- Elevation AMSL: 1,312 ft / 400 m
- Coordinates: 19°53′21.3144″N 99°49′36.5808″E
- Interactive map of Old Chiang Rai Airport

Runways
Direction	Length		Surface
Direction	ft	m	Surface
18/36	5,065	1,544	Asphalt

Old Chiang Rai Airport (ICAO: VTCR) is a non-active airport near the city of Chiang Rai in Chiang Rai province, northern Thailand.

== History ==
In 1926, Chiang Rai Airport was established, making it the first airport in the region and the third in Thailand. Later, during the Pacific War, it was used for transporting military equipment. It was the former base of the 417th Squadron, Royal Thai Air Force. In 1992, it was thought to have been abandoned as the new airport opened. The runways and its area is currently used for recreational activities and events, being used amongst the locals as a park.

In 2018, the airport was used as a heliport to support the Tham Luang cave rescue.

== Former airlines and destinations ==
Airlines	Destinations
Thai Airways Company	Bangkok–Don Mueang, Chiang Mai
Thai Airways International	Bangkok–Don Mueang, Chiang Mai

== See also ==
- Chiang Rai International Airport
