= Cha-ian Airport =

Military airport in Nakhon Si Thammarat, Thailand

Cha-ian Airport สนามบินชะเอียน
- IATA: NST; ICAO: VTSN

Summary
- Airport type: Military
- Owner/Operator: Royal Thai Army
- Serves: Nakhon Si Thammarat
- Location: Pak Phun, Nakhon Si Thammarat, Thailand
- Elevation AMSL: 44 ft / 13 m
- Coordinates: 08°28′16″N 099°57′20″E

Map
- Location in Thailand

Runways
Direction	Length		Surface
Direction	ft	m	Surface
18/36	7,546	2,300	Asphalt

Cha-ian Airport (IATA: VTSN) is a military airport operated by the Fourth Army, Royal Thai Army in the Pak Phun sub-district of Nakhon Si Thammarat Province, in southern Thailand. The Thai Airways Company formerly used Cha-ian Airport for passenger flights between Nakhon Si Thammarat-Surat Thani-Bangkok. Today, the airport is used by the military to transport the royal family.

== History ==
In 1916, King Rama VI built temporary accommodation at Suan-Jun sub-district or Royal Thai 4th Army (Cha Eian Airport).

Starting in 1985, Thai Airways Company operated passenger services at Cha-ian Airport until 1988 when it merged into Thai International.

On 1 December 1998, Nakhon Si Thammarat Airport opened for commercial services, and Cha-ian Airport is now a military airbase.

== Former airlines and destinations ==
Today, there are no scheduled flights from this airport. Formerly, Thai Airways operated flights from here to Surat Thani and Bangkok.
