= Ban Du, Chiang Rai =

Ban Du บ้านดู่
- Subdistrict
- Interactive map of Ban Du
- Coordinates: 19.969073°N 99.858935°E
- Country: Thailand
- Province: Chiang Rai
- District: Mueang Chiang Rai

Population (2005)
  - Total: 14,542
- Time zone: UTC+7 (ICT)

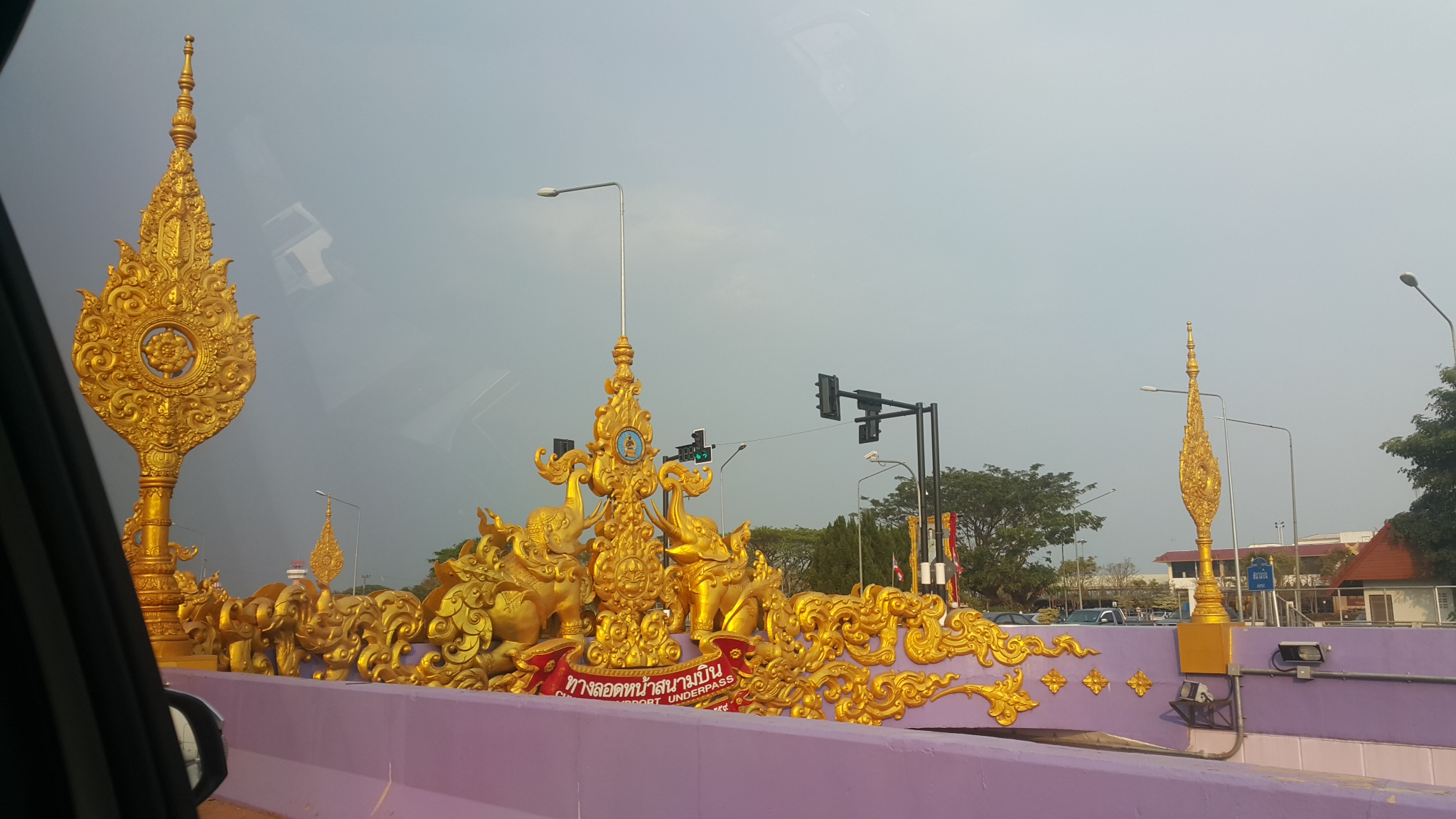
Road tunnel, Chiang Rai International Airport

Ban Du (Thai: บ้านดู่) is a tambon (sub-district) of Mueang Chiang Rai District, in Chiang Rai Province, Thailand. In 2005, it had a population of 14,542 people. The tambon has 19 villages. One of those villages also has the name Ban Du.
