= Phuket International Airport =

Airport in southern Thailand

Phuket International Airport ท่าอากาศยานภูเก็ต

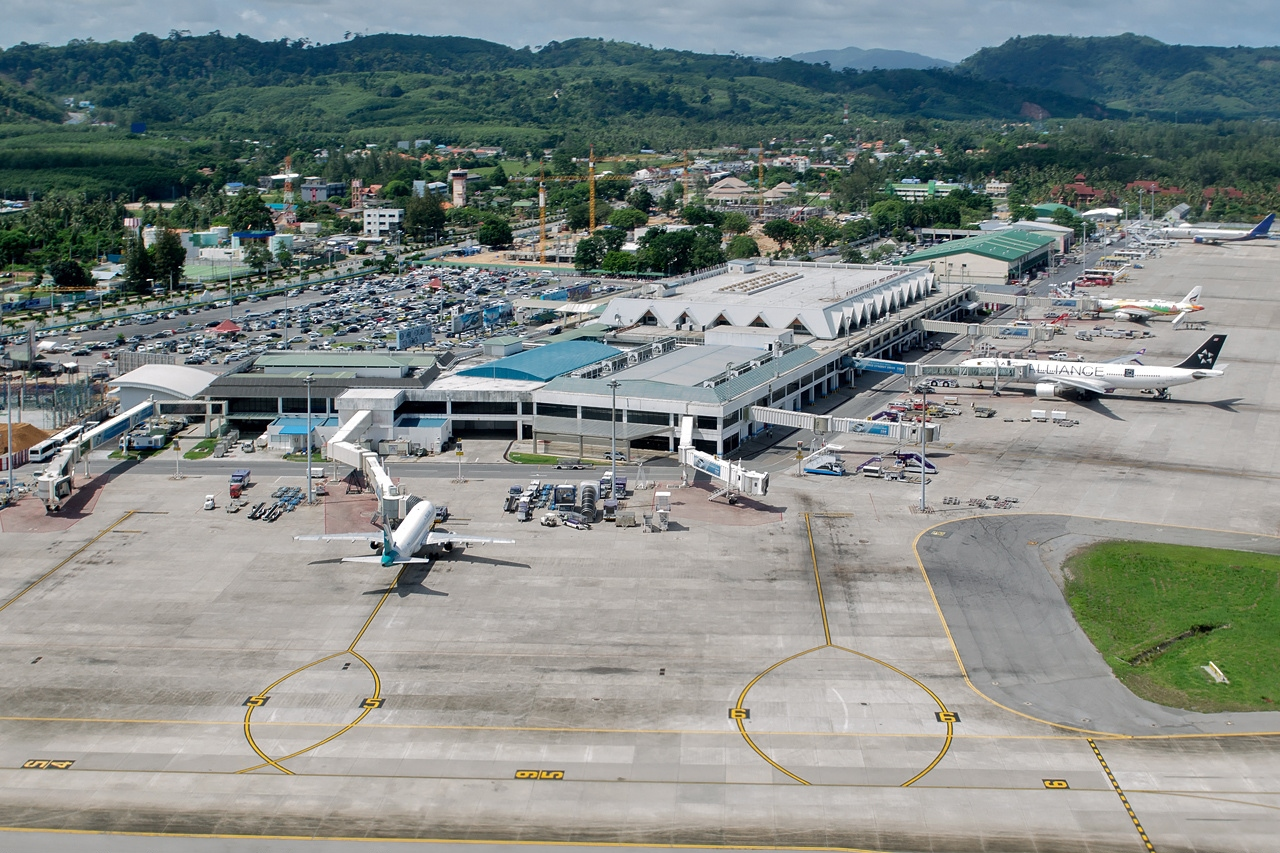
- IATA: HKT; ICAO: VTSP

Summary
- Airport type: Public
- Owner/Operator: Airports of Thailand
- Serves: Phuket
- Location: Mai Khao, Thalang, Phuket, Thailand
- Focus city for: Thai Airways International
- Operating base for: Bangkok Airways; Thai Lion Air; Thai AirAsia
- Elevation AMSL: 82 ft (25 m)
- Coordinates: 08°06′47″N 098°19′00″E
- Website: phuket.airportthai.co.th

Maps
- Location in Phuket province Location in Thailand Location in Southeast Asia
- Interactive map of Phuket International Airport

Runways
Direction	Length		Surface
Direction	m	ft	Surface
09/27	3,000	9,843	Asphalt concrete

Statistics (2025)
- Total passengers: 17,474,051 ▲1.50%
- International passengers: 10,837,291 ▲2.50%
- Domestic passengers: 6,636,760 ▼0.08%
- Aircraft movements: 106,585 ▲2.81%
- Freight (tonnes): 57,774 ▲0.20%
- Sources: Airport Airports of Thailand

Phuket International Airport (IATA: HKT, ICAO: VTSP) is an international airport serving the island province of Phuket in southern Thailand. It is located 32 km (20 mi) north of the city of Phuket in the Mai Khao subdistrict of Thalang district. The airport plays a major role in Thailand's tourism industry, as Phuket is a popular resort destination. It is the third-busiest airport in Thailand in terms of passengers, after Suvarnabhumi Airport and Don Mueang International Airport in the Bangkok Metropolitan Region. The airport set a record of 15.1 million arrivals and departures in 2016, up 17.8 percent from 2015.

== Facilities ==
=== Terminals ===
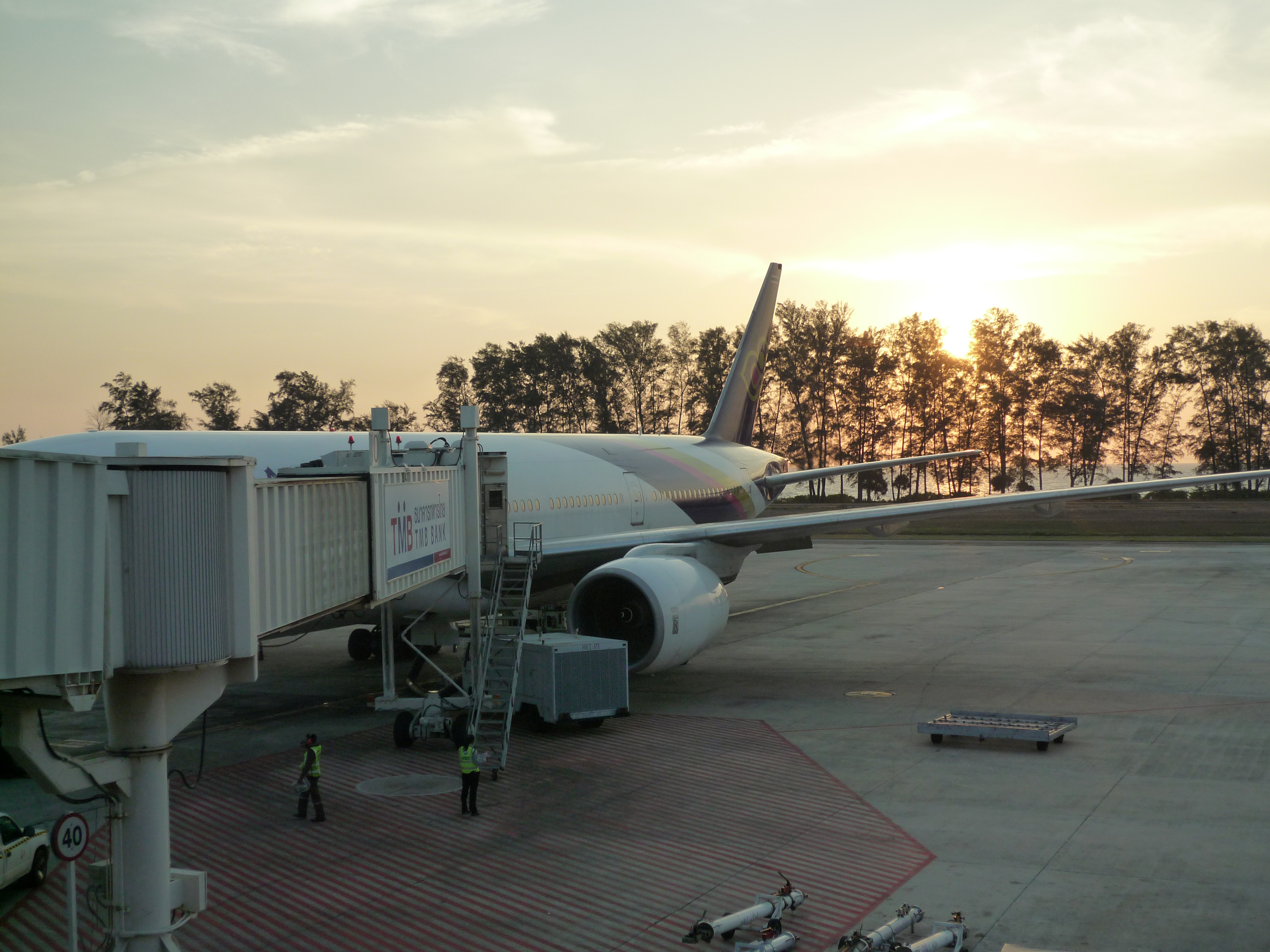
Phuket International Airport (original) in 2010

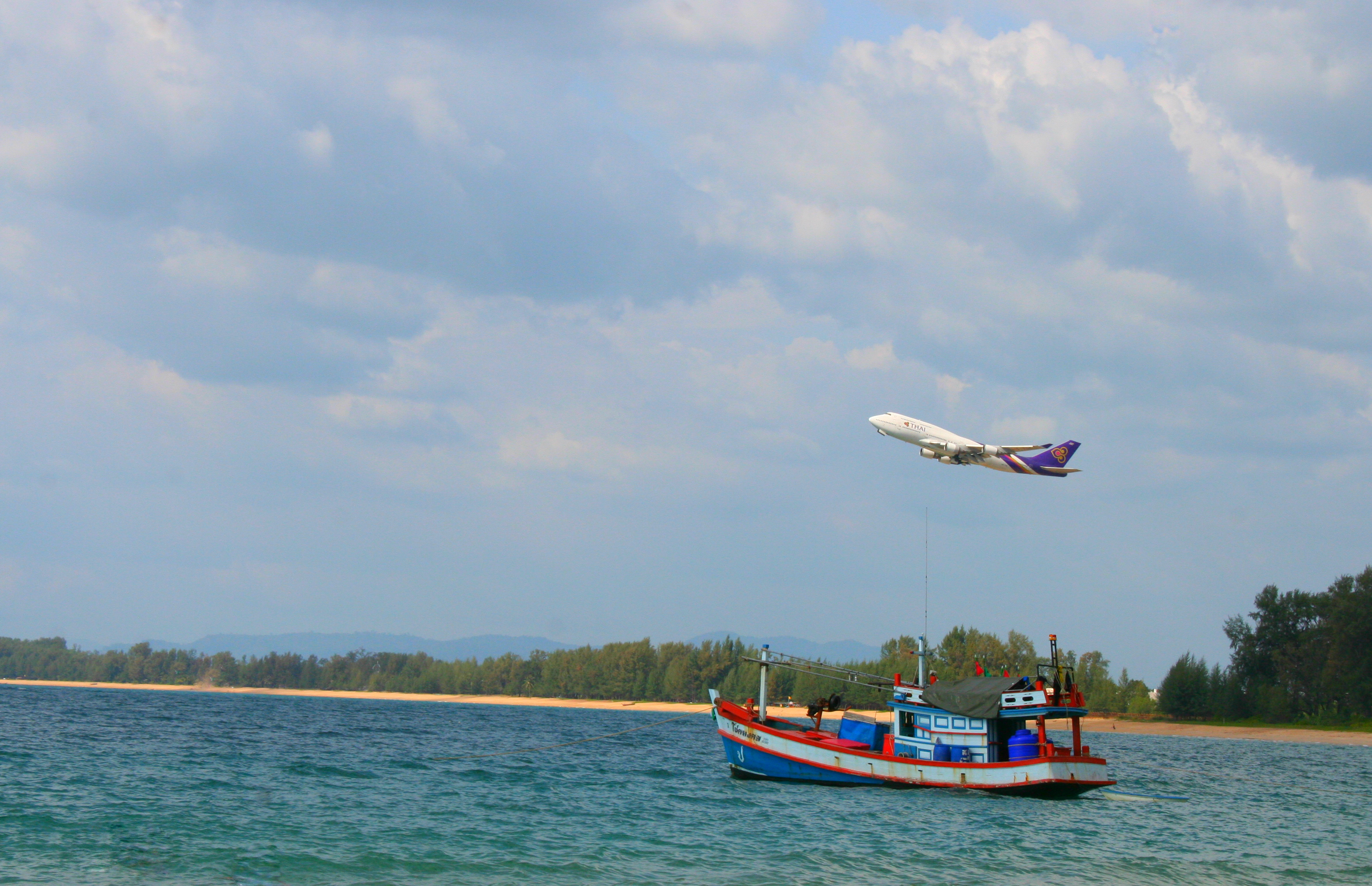
Thai Airways Boeing 747-400 departing from Phuket International Airport

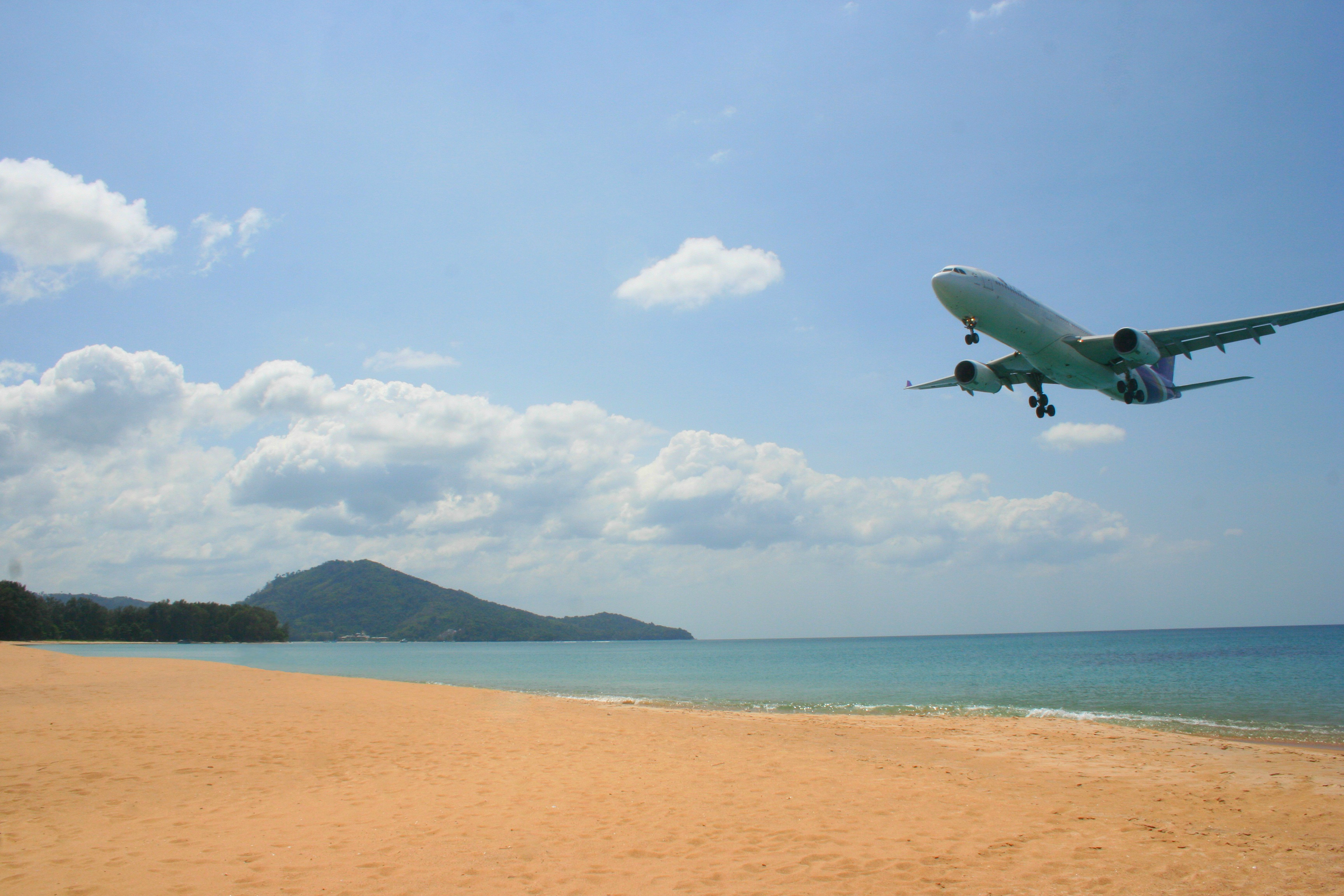
A view from Mai Khao beach with a Thai Airways Airbus A330-300 landing at Phuket International Airport's runway 09

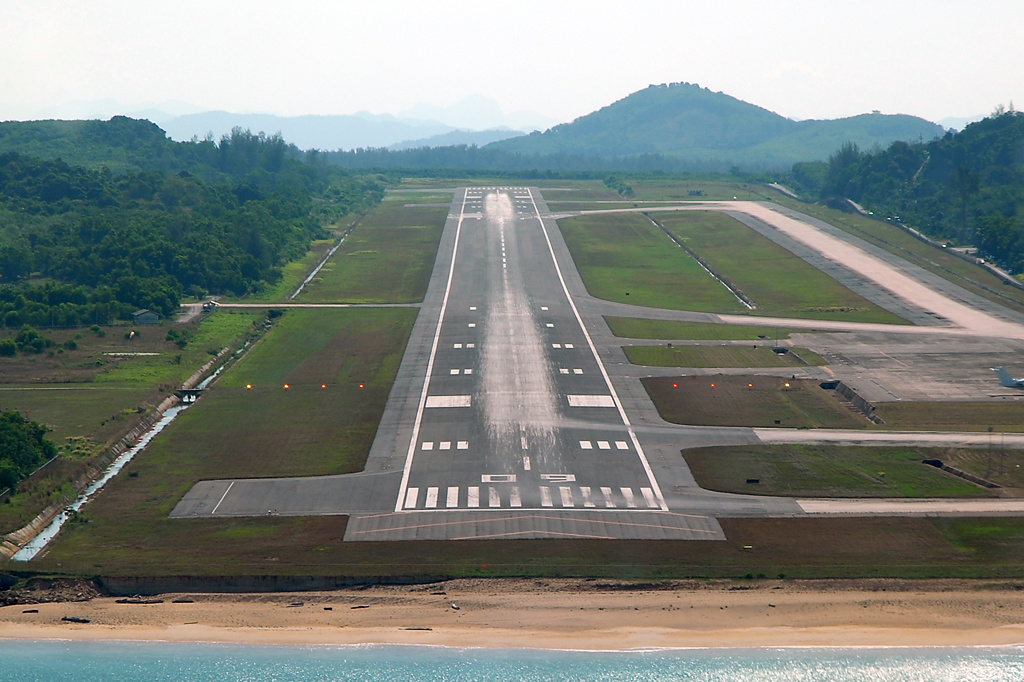
Runway 09, with Mai Khao beach in the foreground

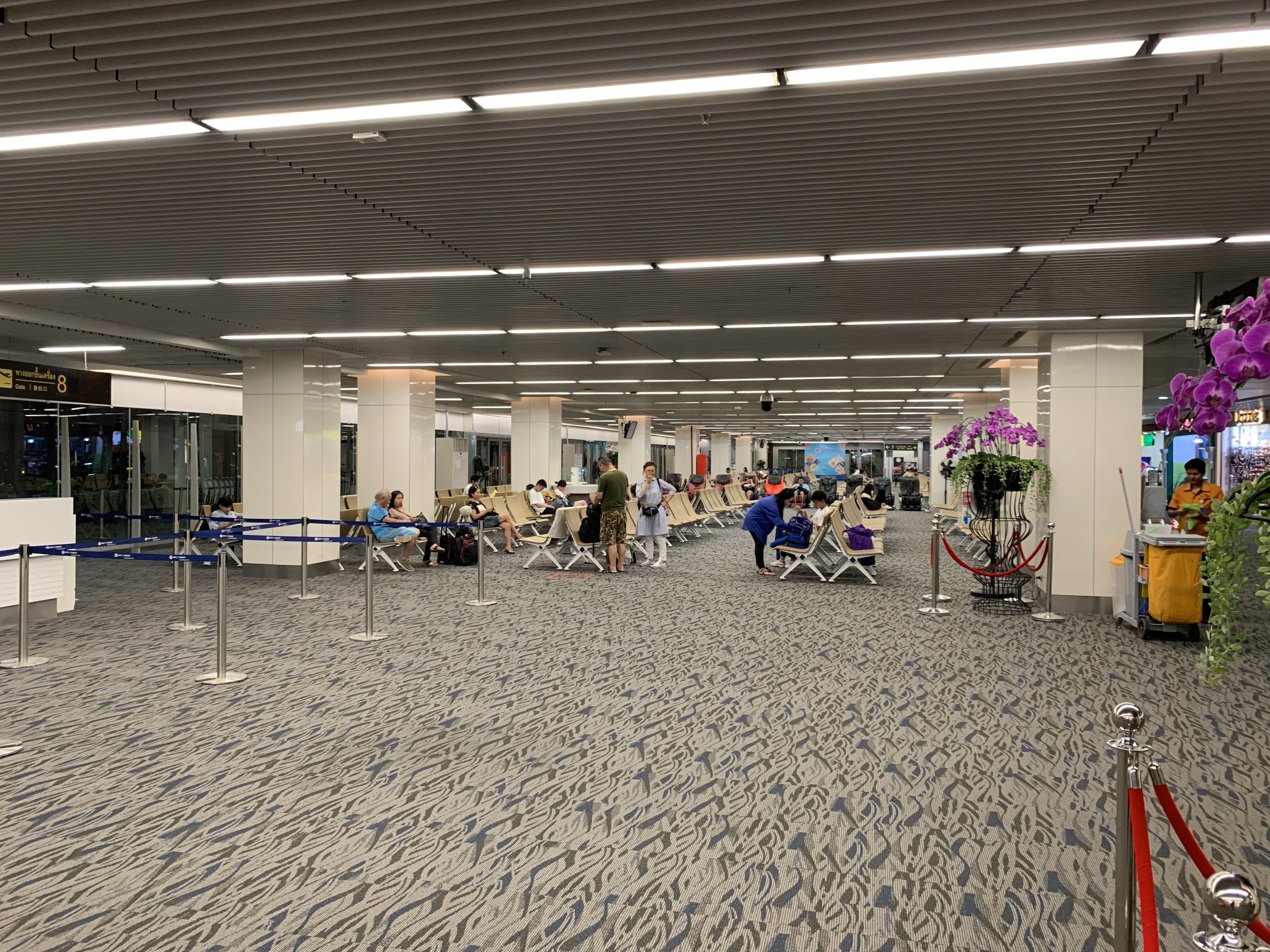
Inside the domestic terminal in 2019

Phuket International Airport features three distinct terminals to manage its air traffic. Terminal 2 is designated for international flights, while Terminal 3 handles domestic flights. Terminal X, specifically intended for charter flights, was opened in February 2014.

To accommodate increasing passenger traffic, Phuket International Airport underwent a significant expansion and renovation project, which was completed in 2016 at a cost of 5.14 billion baht. This expansion of the new international terminal increased its capacity to handle 12.5 million passengers annually. Overall, the expansion enhanced the airport's total capacity from 6.5 million to 20 million passengers per year.

In light of the airport's congestion and limited space for further expansion, a proposal for a rail link from Krabi International Airport, an alternate location, was put forward in 2012. This suggestion aimed to alleviate the growing traffic and logistical challenges faced by Phuket Airport.

== Future ==
A proposal for a new international airport has been put forward, aimed at serving three provinces: Phang Nga, Phuket, and Krabi. The construction of this airport is planned to be carried out in two phases. The first phase of the project was anticipated to be completed by 2025, but in 2022, the entire proposal was put on hold. The new airport was intended to function as an alternative to the existing Phuket and Krabi airports, offering additional capacity and potentially alleviating air traffic congestion in the region.

== Airlines and destinations ==
Airlines	Destinations
Aeroflot	Khabarovsk, Krasnoyarsk, Moscow–Sheremetyevo, Novosibirsk, St. Petersburg, Vladivostok, Yekaterinburg
Air Arabia	Seasonal: Sharjah
Air Astana	Almaty, Astana
Air Changan	Xi'an
Air China	Beijing–Capital, Chengdu–Tianfu, Hangzhou
Air France	Paris–Charles de Gaulle
Air India	Delhi
Air India Express	Hyderabad
AirAsia	Penang
Akasa Air	Bengaluru, Mumbai
arkia	Seasonal: Tel Aviv
Asiana Airlines	Seoul–Incheon
Azur Air	Seasonal charter: Barnaul, Chita, Irkutsk, Mineralnye Vody, Omsk, Perm, Sochi, Surgut, Tomsk, Ufa
Bangkok Airways	Bangkok–Suvarnabhumi, Chiang Mai, Hat Yai, Koh Samui, Pattaya
Batik Air Malaysia	Kuala Lumpur–International
Belavia	Seasonal charter: Minsk
Cathay Pacific	Hong Kong
Centrum Air	Tashkent
China Eastern Airlines	Chengdu–Tianfu, Kunming, Nanjing, Xi'an
China Southern Airlines	Guangzhou
Condor	Frankfurt
Edelweiss Air	Seasonal: Zurich
El Al	Tel Aviv
Emirates	Dubai–International
Etihad Airways	Abu Dhabi
EZY Airlines	Hua Hin
Firefly	Penang
GullivAir	Seasonal charter: Sofia
HK Express	Hong Kong
IndiGo	Bengaluru, Delhi, Kolkata, Mumbai
Indonesia AirAsia	Denpasar
Jetstar	Perth
Juneyao Air	Shanghai–Pudong
Korean Air	Seoul–Incheon
Kunming Airlines	Kunming
LOT Polish Airlines	Seasonal charter: Warsaw–Chopin
Mahan Air	Tehran–Imam Khomeini
Malaysia Airlines	Kuala Lumpur–International
MIAT Mongolian Airlines	Seasonal: Ulaanbaatar
Myanmar Airways International	Yangon
Neos	Seasonal charter: Bratislava, Brno, Ostrava
Nok Air	Bangkok–Don Mueang
Nordwind Airlines	Chelyabinsk, Irkutsk, Khabarovsk, Moscow–Sheremetyevo, Nizhny Novgorod, St. Petersburg, Ufa
Norse Atlantic Airways	Seasonal: Oslo, Stockholm–Arlanda
Oman Air	Muscat
Qanot Sharq	Seasonal: Tashkent
S7 Airlines	Seasonal: Irkutsk, Novosibirsk, Vladivostok (begins 25 December 2026)
SalamAir	Muscat
Saudia	Jeddah, Riyadh
Scandinavian Airlines	Seasonal: Copenhagen (begins 8 December 2026)
Scoot	Singapore
Shanghai Airlines	Shanghai–Pudong
Shenzhen Airlines	Shenzhen
Shirak Avia	Yerevan (begins 14 November 2026)
Sichuan Airlines	Chengdu–Tianfu, Chongqing
Singapore Airlines	Singapore
Spring Airlines	Chengdu–Tianfu, Guangzhou, Ningbo (resumes 18 December 2026), Shanghai–Pudong
Sunclass Airlines	Seasonal charter: Gothenburg, Stockholm–Arlanda
Sunday Airlines	Seasonal charter: Almaty, Bishkek
Thai AirAsia	Bangkok–Don Mueang, Bangkok–Suvarnabhumi, Chennai, Chiang Mai, Khon Kaen, Kochi, Siem Reap, Udon Thani
Thai Airways International	Bangkok–Suvarnabhumi
Thai Lion Air	Bangkok–Don Mueang, Singapore; Charter: Taichung
Thai VietJet Air	Bangkok–Suvarnabhumi, Chiang Rai, Mumbai
Tigerair Taiwan	Taipei–Taoyuan
TransNusa	Denpasar
TUI Airways	Seasonal: London–Gatwick
Turkish Airlines	Istanbul
Qanot Sharq	Bishkek (begins 17 November 2026)
Uzbekistan Airways	Tashkent
VietJet Air	Ho Chi Minh City
Vietnam Airlines	Ho Chi Minh City
Virgin Atlantic	Seasonal: London–Heathrow

== Traffic statistics ==
Phuket is a favorite tourist destination in the region. International passengers mainly come from Asia Pacific and Europe. In 2012 it ranked second-busiest in total passenger traffic, after Suvarnabhumi Airport in the Bangkok metropolitan area. In mid-2015 the airport, designed to handle 20 flights per hour, was servicing 23 per hour.

Phuket airport handled 12.9 million passengers in 2015, 12.8 percent more than 2014, with international numbers rising 8.27 percent to 6.95 million and domestic up 18.6 percent to 5.9 million. Aircraft movements grew 11.6 percent to 84,758, with 43,996 international (up 7.63 percent) and 40,762 domestic (up 16.1 percent).

=== Passenger movements ===
Year	Domestic	International	Total	Change%
1995	1,730,895	919,503	2,650,398	▲9.68
1996	1,896,068	879,688	2,775,756	▲4.73
1997	1,898,303	942,336	2,840,639	▲2.34
1998	2,132,108	1,010,606	3,142,714	▲10.63
1999	2,035,836	1,189,895	3,225,731	▲2.64
2000	2,171,146	1,358,745	3,541,575	▲9.43
2001	2,240,264	1,370,429	3,610,693	▲2.29
2002	2,230,663	1,382,858	3,613,521	▲0.08
2003	2,104,548	1,496,401	3,600,949	▼0.35
2004	2,826,022	2,024,879	4,850,901	▲34.71
2005	2,246,723	922,311	3,169,034	▼34.67
2006	3,032,976	1,677,723	4,710,699	▲48.65
2007	3,513,966	2,190,399	5,704,365	▲21.09
2008	3,321,443	2,409,305	5,703,748	▲0.46
2009	3,489,012	2,290,906	5,779,918	▲0.86
2010	3,701,427	3,342,356	7,043,783	▲21.87
2011	4,097,276	4,370,719	8,467,995	▲20.22
2012	4,475,624	5,065,928	9,541,552	▲12.68
2013	4,958,880	6,383,611	11,342,491	▲18.87
2014	4,976,451	6,425,047	11,401,498	▲0.52
2015	5,909,356	6,950,000	12,859,356	▲12.8
2016	6,997,879	8,109,306	15,107,185	▲17.48
2017	7,655,579	9,200,058	16,855,637	▲11.6
2018	7,817,894	10,403,631	18,221,525	▲8.1
2019	7,452,262	10,666,178	18,118,440	▼0.57
2020	2,332,349	3,155,264	5,429,708	▼70.0
2021	1,502,356	287,481	1,789,837	▼67.04
2022	4,659,672	3,155,264	7,814,936	▲336.63%
2023	6,262,326	7,716,858	13,979,184	▲78.88%
2024	6,641,912	10,573,403	17,215,315	▲18.75%
2025	6,636,760	10,837,291	17,474,051	▲1.50%

=== Aircraft movements ===
Year	Domestic	International	Total	Change%
1995	11,135	9,380	20,515	▲6.79
1996	11,586	9,626	21,212	▲3.40
1997	11,402	10,257	21,659	▲2.11
1998	9,673	10,272	19,945	▼7.91
1999	9,391	11,887	21,278	▲6.68
2000	11,850	11,472	23,322	▲9.61
2001	12,705	12,467	25,172	▲7.93
2002	10,920	12,248	23,168	▼7.96
2003	12,669	12,015	24,684	▲6.54
2004	16,765	15,917	32,682	▲32.40
2005	14,115	9,970	24,085	▼26.30
2006	17,207	13,680	30,887	▲28.24
2007	23,915	16,884	40,799	▲32.09
2008	20,814	17,177	37,991	▼6.88
2009	20,883	16,987	37,870	▼0.32
2010	25,311	23,257	48,568	▲28.25
2011	27,932	28,741	56,673	▲16.69
2012	28,578	32,426	61,004	▲7.64
2013	32,370	40,219	72,589	▲18.99
2014	35,096	40,878	75,974	▲4.66
2015	40,762	43,996	84,758	▲16.1
2016	48,883	48,930	97,813	▲15.4
2017	52,609	53,484	106,093	▲8.5
2018	54,514	63,766	118,280	▲11.49
2019	50,409	65,167	115,576	▼2.29
2020	25,505	13,343	38,848	▼66.4
2021	14,347	4,177	18,524	▼52.32
2022	36,033	21,436	57,469	▲210.24
2023	44,080	43,224	87,304	▲51.91
2024	46,369	57,306	103,675	▲23.15
2025	48,761	57,824	106,585	▲2.81

=== Freight tonnage ===
Year	Domestic	International	Total	Change%
1995	5,659	5,021	10,680	▲198.16
1996	7,994	5,620	13,614	▲27.47
1997	8,285	7,522	15,807	▲16.11
1998	8,213	7,683	15,896	▲0.56
1999	10,963	11,455	22,418	▲41.03
2000	9,841	11,091	20,932	▼6.63
2001	9,345	9,651	18,996	▼9.25
2002	10,352	12,855	23,207	▲22.17
2003	10,866	12,338	23,204	▲0.01
2004	13,382	14,659	28,041	▲20.85
2005	12,306	6,425	18,731	▼33.20
2006	13,384	4,729	18,113	▼3.30
2007	13,268	6,452	19,720	▲8.87
2008	12,671	6,535	19,206	▼2.61
2009	13,195	7,780	20,975	▲9.21
2010	17,434	12,810	30,244	▲44.19
2011	17,627	10,687	28,314	▼6.38
2012	18,798	15,541	34,339	▲21.28
2013	17,234	17,386	34,620	▲0.82
2014	17,653	22,631	40,284	▲16.36
2015	14,552	22,822	37,374	▼7.22
2016	14,676	28,538	43,214	▼5.73
2017	15,670	37,529	53,990	▲23.1
2018	15,864	46,274	62,138	▲15.09
2019	11,592	41,120	52,712	▼15.17
2020	4,429	10,797	11,904	▼78.1
2021	2,111	2,098	4,209	▼64.64
2022	3,152	3,391	6,543	▼68.37
2023	4,699	27,518	32,217	▲330.71
2024	4,549	53,106	57,655	▲78.96
2025	4,979	52,795	57,774	▲0.20

=== Busiest international routes ===
Busiest international routes to and from Phuket International Airport (2019)
Rank	Airport	Passengers handled	Change%
1	Singapore	1,052,635	▼0.58%
2	Kuala Lumpur–International	871,584	▲1.00%
3	Shanghai–Pudong	760,864	▼1.64%
4	Hong Kong	642,904	▼4.57%
5	Chengdu–Shuangliu	546,908	▲32.49%
6	Seoul–Incheon	461,967	▲6.57%
7	Doha	422,087	▲23.08%
8	Beijing–Capital	412,213	▲4.58%
9	Dubai–International	367,967	▼13.90%
10	Moscow–Sheremetyevo	362,977	▲11.53%

=== Busiest domestic routes ===
Busiest domestic routes to and from Phuket Airport (2019)
Rank	Airport	Passengers handled	Change%
1	Bangkok–Suvarnabhumi	3,371,171	▲0.29%
2	Bangkok–Don Mueang	3,005,310	▼9.86%
3	Chiang Mai	415,771	▼12.23%
4	Pattaya	165,992	▲4.58%
5	Koh Samui	154,242	▼10.97%

== Incidents and accidents ==
- 15 April 1985: A Thai Airways Company Boeing 737-200 (registered HS-TBB) crashed, killing all 11 people on board. The crew had issued a radio call informing air traffic control that both engines had flamed out. No cause could be determined for the engine shutdown.
- 31 August 1987: Thai Airways Flight 365, a Boeing 737-200 (registered HS-TBC) from Hat Yai International Airport crashed into the ocean upon final approach, killing all 83 people on board. The investigation determined pilot error as the primary cause.
- 11 March 2026: An Air India Express Boeing 737 MAX 8 (registered VT-BWQ) from Hyderabad's Rajiv Gandhi International Airport made a hard landing on runway 09, causing damage to the aircraft's nose landing gear, resulting in the aircraft losing both nose landing gear tires . The aircraft became disabled on the runway, forcing the closure of the airport's only runway for approximately six hours while the aircraft was removed and runway inspected. All passengers and crew were evacuated safely with no injuries reported.
