= Chiang Mai International Airport =

Airport in northern Thailand

Chiang Mai International Airport ท่าอากาศยานเชียงใหม่

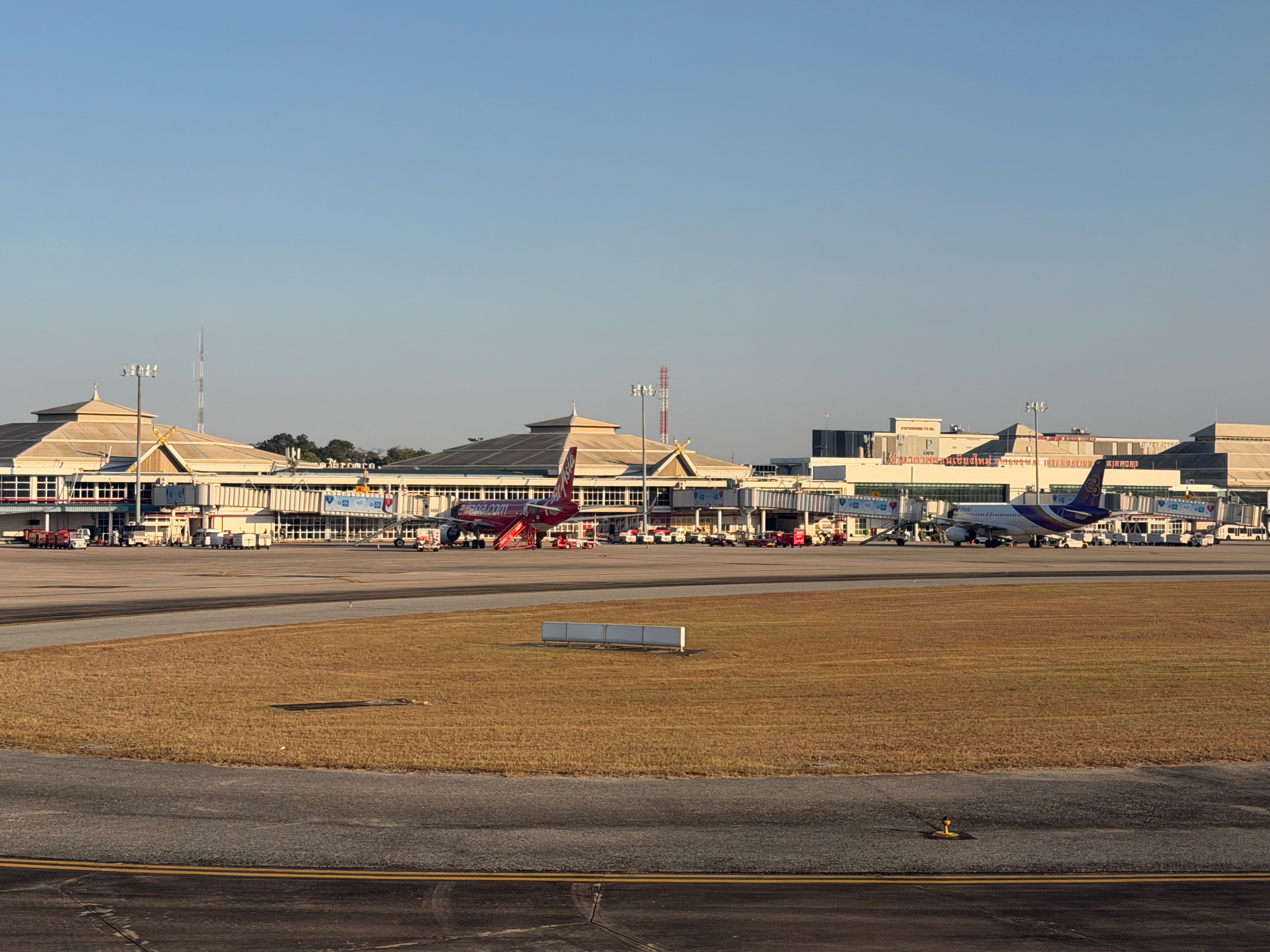
- IATA: CNX; ICAO: VTCC

Summary
- Airport type: Public / military
- Owner: Royal Thai Air Force
- Operator: Airports of Thailand
- Serves: Chiang Mai
- Location: Suthep, Mueang Chiang Mai, Chiang Mai, Thailand
- Opened: 16 February 1924; 102 years ago
- Focus city for: Thai Airways International
- Operating base for: Bangkok Airways; Nok Air; Thai AirAsia
- Elevation AMSL: 1,036 ft (316 m)
- Coordinates: 18°46′00″N 098°57′45″E
- Website: chiangmai.airportthai.co.th

Maps
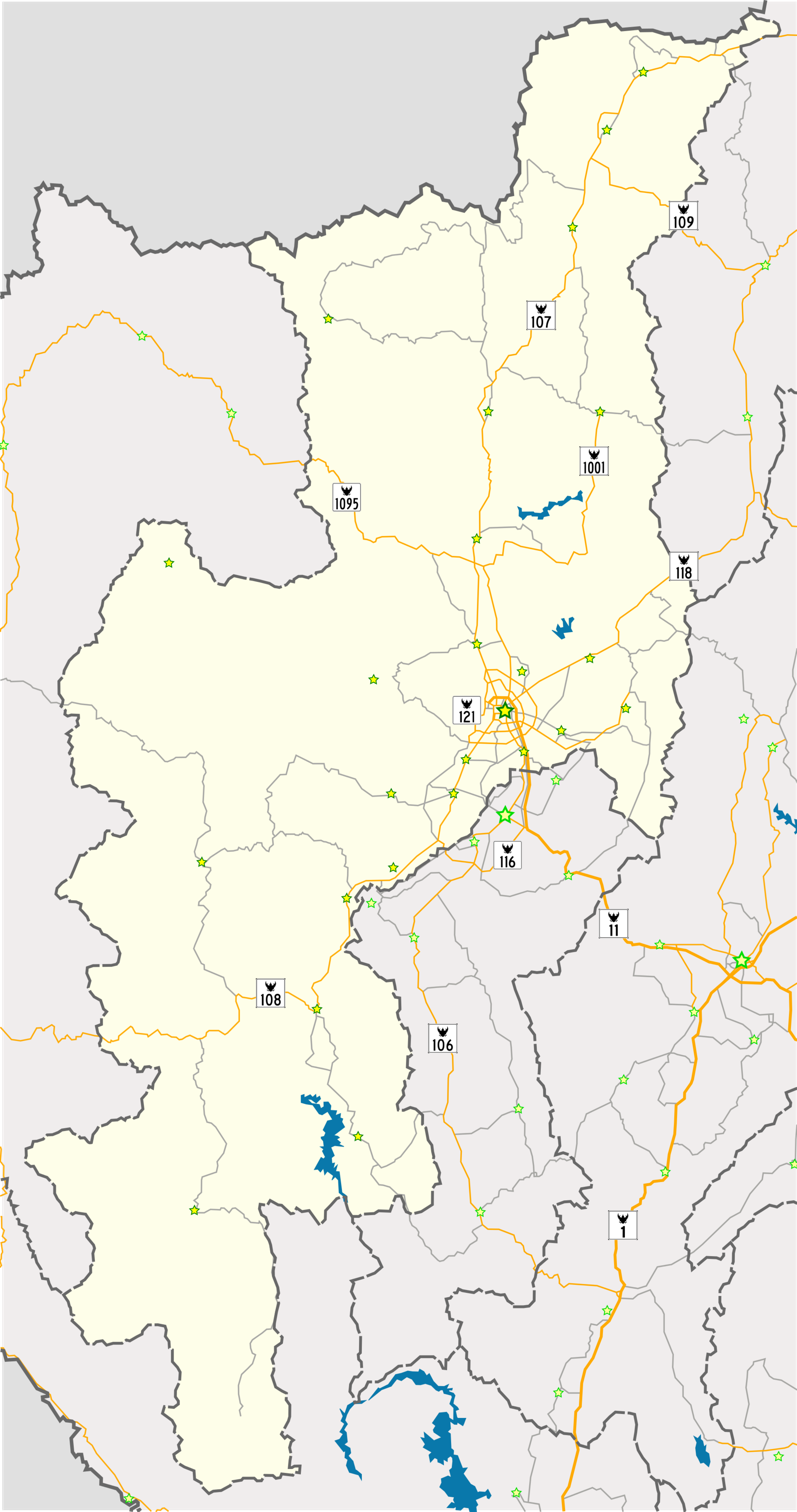
- Location in Chiang Mai province Location in Thailand Location in Southeast Asia
- Interactive map of Chiang Mai International Airport

Runways
Direction	Length		Surface
Direction	m	ft	Surface
18/36	3,400	11,155	Asphalt

Statistics (2025)
- Passengers: 9,517,206 ▲4.79%
- International passengers: 2,565,686 ▲1.87%
- Domestic passengers: 6,951,520 ▲5.91%
- Aircraft movements: 64,124 ▲6.88%
- Freight (tonnes): 5,413 ▼4.19%
- Source: Airports of Thailand

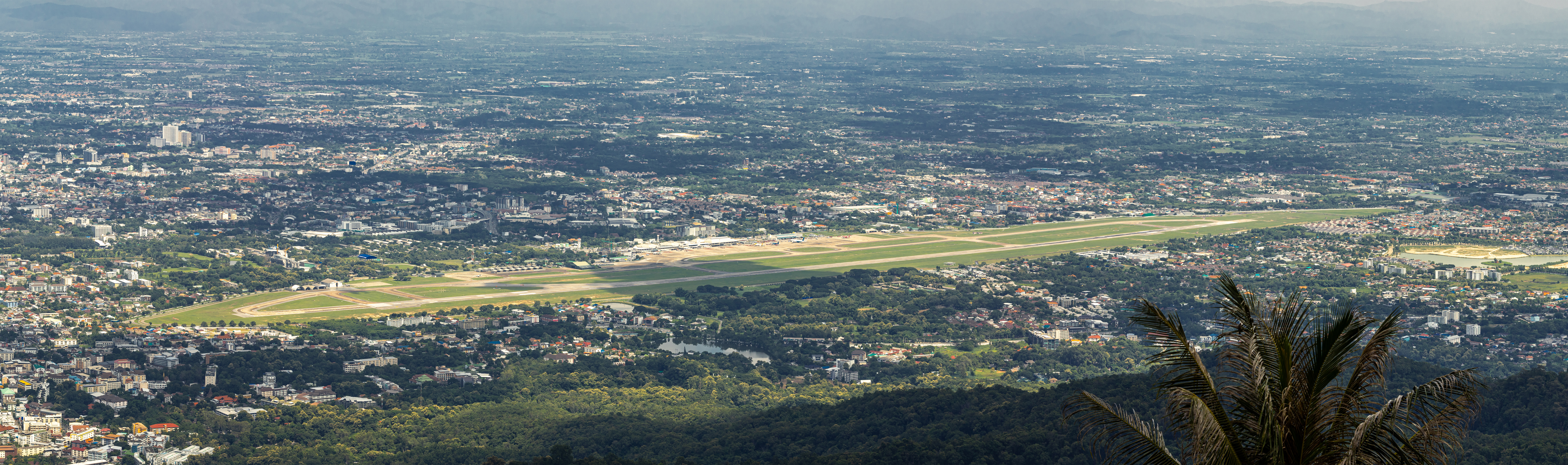
Aerial view of the airport and southern part of the city, captured from Doi Suthep

Chiang Mai International Airport (IATA: CNX, ICAO: VTCC) is an international airport in Suthep subdistrict, Mueang Chiang Mai district, Chiang Mai province in Northern Thailand. It is a major gateway that links northern Thailand to the rest of the region and is currently the fourth-busiest airport in the country. It is managed by Airports of Thailand.

== History ==
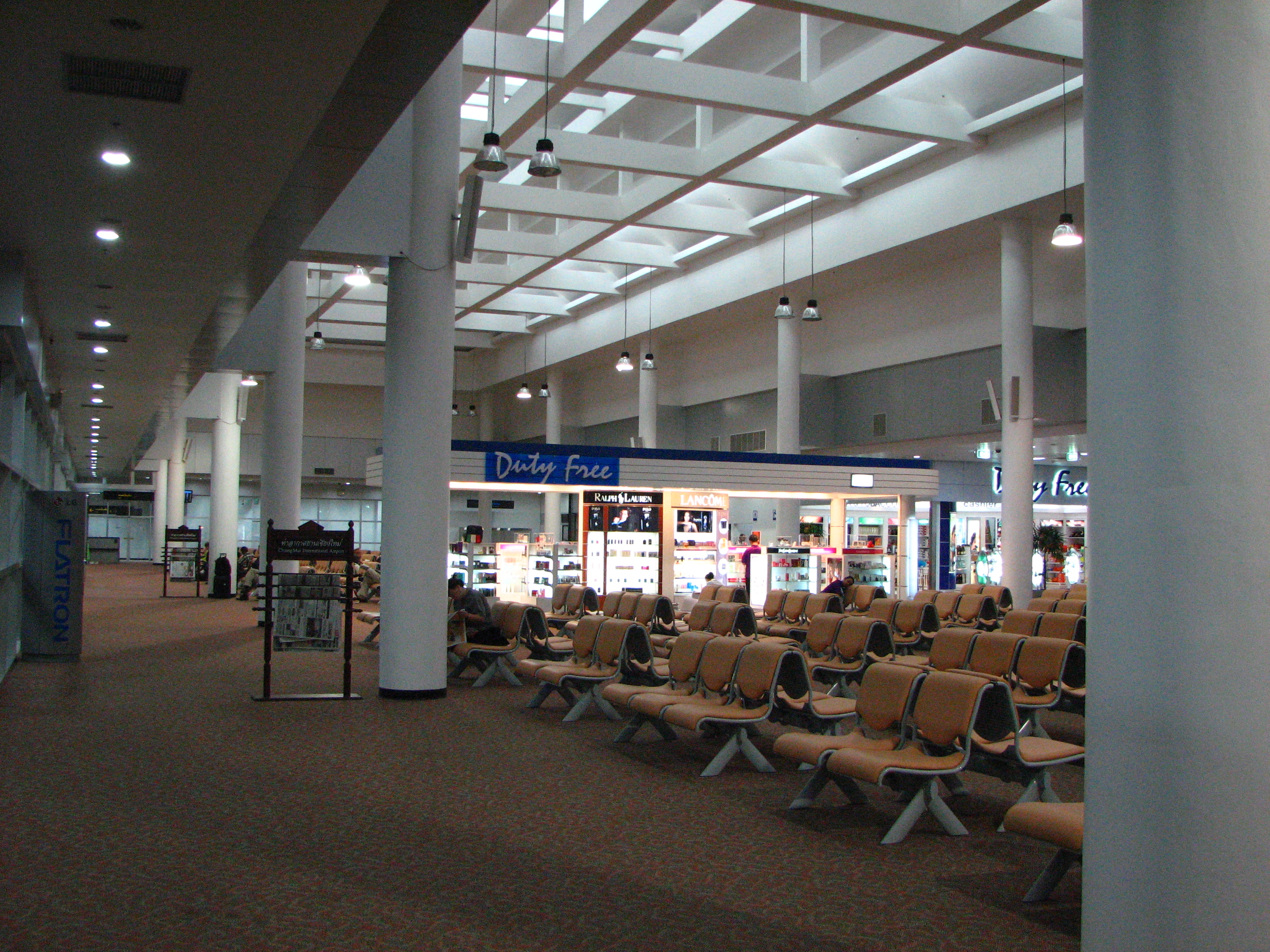
Chiang Mai Airport International Departure Hall

The airport began operations in 1934 as Suthep Airport, after it developed as an airstrip in the early 1920s. Until World War Two, it was used mainly for postal delivery services, with some military use. During the war, it was used by the occupying Japanese forces, and was hence attacked by British and US air forces.

The first scheduled passenger flight to Chiang Mai arrived in 1947, with the foundation of Siamese Airways. At this time and until the late 1950s the runway surface was still grass or dirt, with very few support buildings.

Airports of Thailand expanded the terminal with upgrades in 2014 including expansion of the apron for larger planes, extending operating hours to 24/7 (effective April 2014), and enlarging the international arrival hall and domestic departure hall. As of 2018, 31 airlines operated at CNX, serving 11 million passengers, 78,210 flights and 14,612 tonnes of cargo.

As a result of the temporary closure of Suvarnabhumi Airport in 2008 due to the protests, Chiang Mai was used as an alternative stopover for China Airlines flights between Taipei and Europe and for Swiss International Air Lines' Singapore-Zurich flights. On 24 January 2011, the airport became a secondary hub for Thai AirAsia. China Airlines subsequently regularised the stopover.

== Facilities ==
The airport is at an elevation of 316 metres (1,037 ft) above mean sea level. It has one runway designated 18/36 with an asphalt surface measuring 3,100 by 45 metres (10,171 ft × 148 ft). There are two terminals, one for domestic passengers and the other for international flights.

== Units ==
The following lists the units that were based at Chiang Mai Airport:

Royal Thai Air Force

- 411 Fighter Squadron of 41st Wing RTAF

Royal Air Force

- No. 20 Squadron RAF detachment, 1 September 1961 - 18 February 1970, equipped with Hunter FGA 9

== Airlines and destinations ==
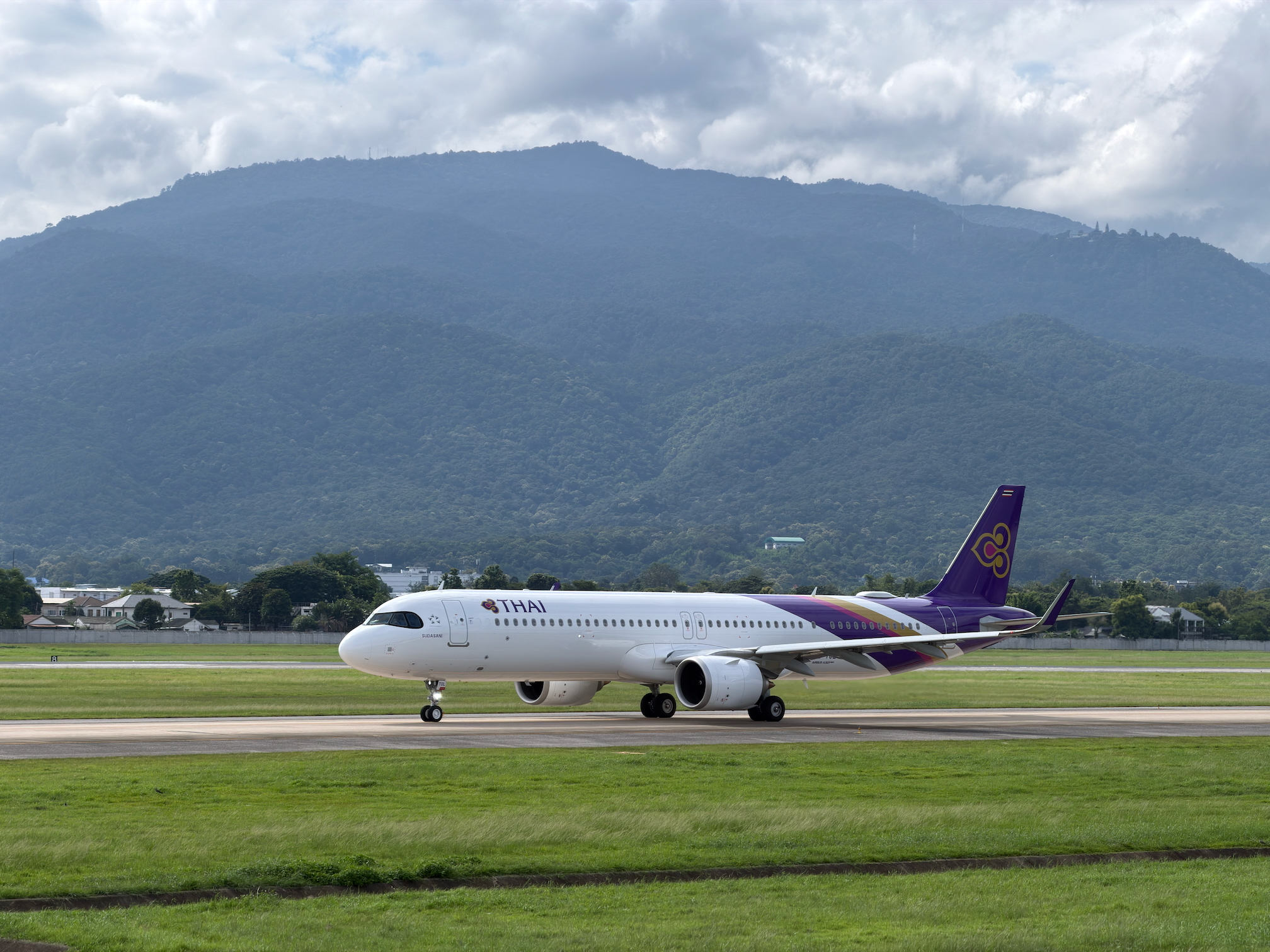
Thai Airways A321neo at Chiang Mai Airport

Airlines	Destinations
Air Busan	Seasonal: Seoul–Incheon
Air China	Beijing–Capital
AirAsia	Kuala Lumpur–International
Bangkok Airways	Bangkok–Suvarnabhumi, Koh Samui, Phuket
China Airlines	Taipei–Taoyuan
China Southern Airlines	Shenzhen
Eastar Jet	Busan, Seoul–Incheon
Etihad Airways	Abu Dhabi
EVA Air	Taipei–Taoyuan
HK Express	Hong Kong
Jeju Air	Seoul–Incheon
Korean Air	Seoul–Incheon
Lao Airlines	Luang Prabang
Malaysia Airlines	Kuala Lumpur–International
Myanmar Airways International	Mandalay, Yangon
Nok Air	Bangkok–Don Mueang, Udon Thani
Ruili Airlines	Xishuangbanna
Scoot	Singapore
Spring Airlines	Xi'an
Starlux Airlines	Taipei–Taoyuan
Thai AirAsia	Bangkok–Don Mueang, Bangkok–Suvarnabhumi, Hanoi, Hat Yai, Hua Hin, Khon Kaen, Krabi, Phuket, Sapporo–Chitose, Surat Thani, Taipei–Taoyuan, Udon Thani
Thai Airways International	Bangkok–Suvarnabhumi
Thai Lion Air	Bangkok–Don Mueang
Thai VietJet Air	Bangkok–Suvarnabhumi, Osaka–Kansai
VietJet Air	Ho Chi Minh City
West Air	Chongqing

== Statistics ==
=== Traffic by calendar year ===
Comparison of passenger volume, aircraft movements and cargo volume at Chiang Mai International Airport, by year
Year	Passengers	Change from previous year	Movements	Cargo (tons)	Notes
2011	3,880,037	–	32,445	21,484	
2012	4,491,331	▲15.75%	36,981	19,628	
2013	5,463,921	▲21.65%	43,366	18,188	
2014	6,630,624	▲21.35%	52,642	17,796	
2015	8,365,851	▲26.17%	63,843	18,425	
2016	9,446,320	▲12.92%	69,202	18,512	
2017	10,230,280	▲8.3%	71,994	17,302	
2018	10,989,869	▲7.42%	78,210	14,615	
2019	11,333,548	▲3.13%	79,504	12,313	
2020	4,851,475	▼57.19%	39,455	4,915	
2021	1,762,732	▼63.67%	16,051	3,318	
2022	5,459,481	▲209.72%	39,027	5,584	
2023	8,224,573	▲50.65%	55,663	5,255	
2024	9,082,071	▲6.88%	59,493	5,474	
2025	9,517,206	▲4.79%	64,124	5,413	

=== Busiest international routes 2019 ===
Busiest international routes to and from Chiang Mai Airport (2019)
Rank	Airport	Passengers handled	Change %
1	(China) Shanghai–Pudong	446,398	▲18.41%
2	Hong Kong	323,897	▼10.71%
3	(China) Guangzhou	297,819	▲3.67%
4	(South Korea) Seoul–Incheon	251,805	▲64.77%
5	(China) Kunming	232,791	▲15.44%
6	(Taiwan) Taipei–Taoyuan	221,975	▲192.24%
7	(Malaysia) Kuala Lumpur–International	171,918	▼3.84%
8	Singapore	128,657	▼4.99%
9	Macau	112,956	▼11.17%
10	(China) Hangzhou	110,614	▲43.60%

=== Busiest domestic routes 2019 ===
Busiest domestic routes to and from Chiang Mai Airport (2019)
Rank	Airport	Passengers handled	Change %
1	Bangkok–Don Mueang	3,565,272	▲0.39%
2	Bangkok–Suvarnabhumi	2,866,138	▼1.81%
3	Phuket	415,726	▼12.27%
4	Pattaya	323,547	▲0.40%
5	Krabi	209,382	▼0.31%

== Bibliography ==
- Jefford, C. G. (2001). RAF Squadrons. A comprehensive record of the movement and equipment of all RAF squadrons and their antecedents since 1912 (2nd ed.). Shrewsbury, UK: Airlife Publishing. ISBN 1-84037-141-2.
