= Hat Yai International Airport =

Airport in southern Thailand

Hat Yai International Airport ท่าอากาศยานหาดใหญ่

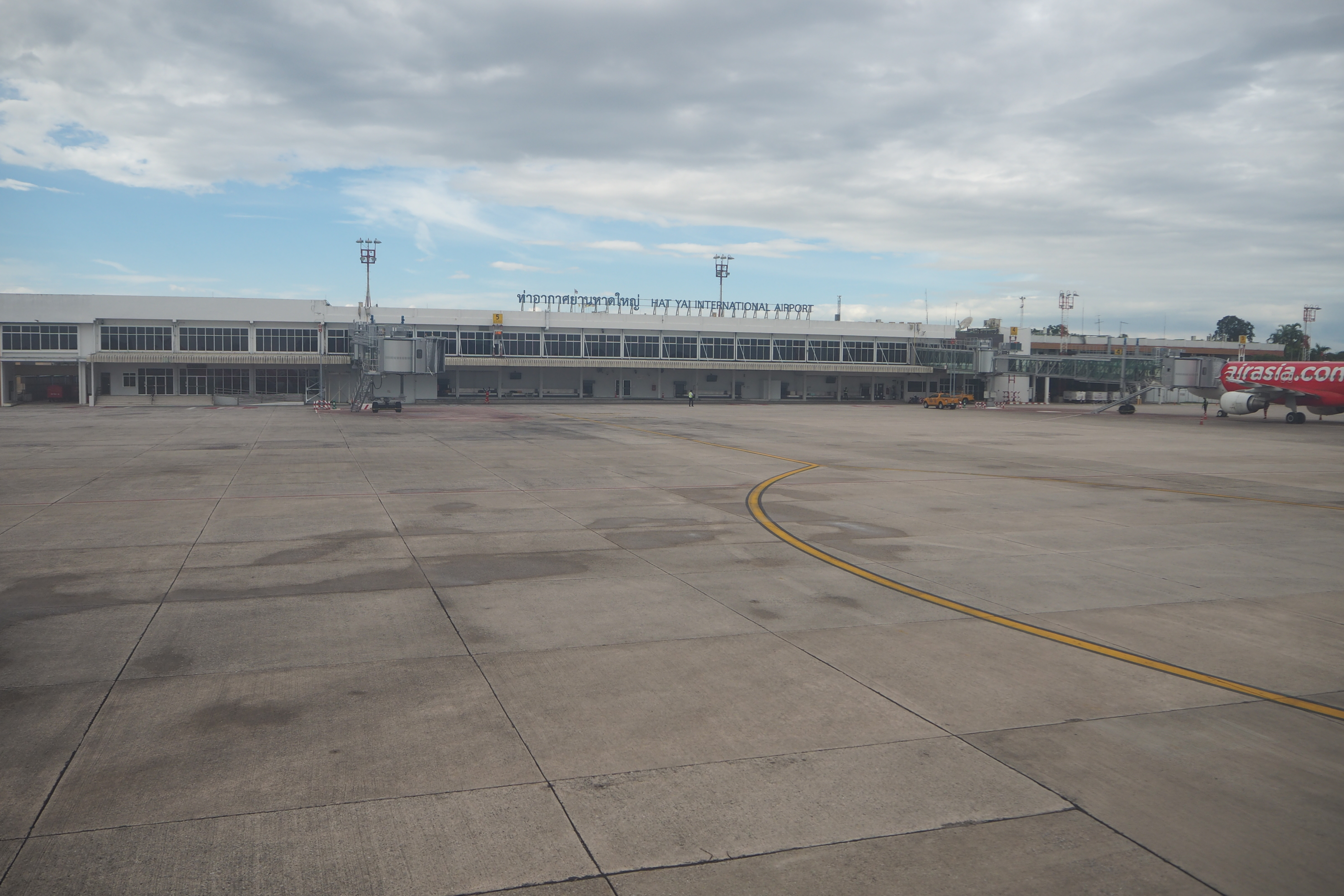
- Hat Yai International Airport (August 2026)
- IATA: HDY; ICAO: VTSS

Summary
- Airport type: Public
- Owner/Operator: Airports of Thailand
- Serves: Hat Yai
- Location: Khlong La, Khlong Hoi Khong, Songkhla, Thailand
- Operating base for: Thai AirAsia
- Elevation AMSL: 90 ft (27 m)
- Coordinates: 06°55′59″N 100°23′34″E
- Website: hatyai.airportthai.co.th

Maps
- Location of airport in Thailand
- Interactive map of Hat Yai International Airport

Runways
Direction	Length		Surface
Direction	ft	m	Surface
08/26	10,007	3,150	Asphalt concrete

Statistics (2025)
- Total passengers: 3,305,661 ▲6.70%
- International passengers: 270,360 ▼5.46%
- Domestic passengers: 3,035,301 ▲7.93%
- Aircraft movements: 22,705 ▲10.48%
- Freight (tonnes): 4,204 ▲13.99%
- Source: Airports of Thailand

Hat Yai International Airport (Note: Thai: ท่าอากาศยานหาดใหญ่) (IATA: HDY, ICAO: VTSS) is in Khlong La subdistrict, Khlong Hoi Khong district, Songkhla province in southern Thailand, near the city of Hat Yai. It is under the management of Airports of Thailand, PLC (AOT). It serves more than 3 million passengers per year, 12,000 flights, and 3,000 tons of cargo, making it the fifth busiest airport in the country by passenger traffic in 2023.

== Overview ==
At longitude 100° 23' 55" E and latitude 06° 55' 46" N, 28 m above sea level, the airport is 9 km (6 mi) east of downtown Hat Yai and 43 km east of Songkhla city. Highway 4135 (Sanambin Panij Road) links to the airport. Its service hours are 06:00–24:00. The runway can handle 30 flights per hour, and its durability is rated at PCN 60/F/C/X/T. There are seven taxiways and an apron area of 56,461 m^{2}.

== Statistics ==
=== Traffic by calendar year ===
Comparison of passenger volume, aircraft movements and cargo volume at Hat Yai International Airport, by year
Year	Passengers	Change from previous year	Movements	Cargo (tons)	Notes
2011	1,869,113	–	14,032	15,476	
2012	2,127,483	▲13.82%	15,052	16,206	
2013	2,552,509	▲19.98%	17,551	12,295	
2014	3,147,281	▲23.3%	22,319	9,287	
2015	3,639,936	▲15.65%	24,607	9,695	
2016	4,004,665	▲10.02%	28,097	9,044	
2017	4,367,364	▲9.06%	30,067	9,567	
2018	4,256,107	▼2.55%	29,203	8,445	
2019	3,898,092	▼8.41%	25,899	7,794	
2020	2,371,193	▼39.17%	18,798	4,693	
2021	1,209,855	▼48.98%	10,150	3,192	
2022	2,944,984	▲143.42%	21,075	3,742	
2023	3,122,124	▲6.01%	20,230	3,179	
2024	3,098,213	▼0.77%	20,551	3,544	
2025	3,305,661	▲6.70%%	22,705	4,204	

== Expansion ==
Expansion plans are in the works, as the airport is designed for 2.5 million passengers and was already seeing 4.5 million passengers in 2018. The upgrade will expand the airport's capacity to serve over 10 million passengers by 2030.

== Airlines and destinations ==
Airlines	Destinations
Bangkok Airways	Phuket
Batik Air Malaysia	Kuala Lumpur–International
Berjaya Air	Kuala Lumpur–Subang
EZY Airlines	Betong, Hua Hin
Nok Air	Bangkok–Don Mueang
Scoot	Singapore
Thai AirAsia	Bangkok–Don Mueang, Bangkok–Suvarnabhumi, Chiang Mai, Kuala Lumpur–International
Thai Airways International	Bangkok–Suvarnabhumi
Thai Lion Air	Bangkok–Don Mueang, Udon Thani
Thai VietJet Air	Bangkok–Suvarnabhumi

== Accidents and incidents ==
- During the 2005 Songkhla bombings, a bomb planted at the departure lounge by Pattani separatists exploded on 3 April 2005, killing two passengers and injuring ten.
