= Chiang Rai International Airport =

Airport in northern Thailand

Mae Fah Luang – Chiang Rai International Airport ท่าอากาศยานแม่ฟ้าหลวง เชียงราย

- IATA: CEI; ICAO: VTCT

Summary
- Airport type: Public
- Owner/Operator: Airports of Thailand; Royal Thai Police
- Serves: Chiang Rai; Phayao
- Location: Ban Du, Mueang Chiang Rai, Chiang Rai, Thailand
- Opened: 5 August 1992; 34 years ago
- Operating base for: Thai AirAsia
- Elevation AMSL: 390 m (1,280 ft)
- Coordinates: 19°57′08″N 99°52′58″E
- Website: chiangrai.airportthai.co.th

Maps
- Location in Thailand Location in Southeast Asia
- Interactive map of Mae Fah Luang – Chiang Rai International Airport

Runways
Direction	Length		Surface
Direction	m	ft	Surface
03/21	3,000	9,843	Asphalt concrete

Statistics (2025)
- Total passengers: 1,981,088 ▲3.57%
- International passengers: 7,161 ▼2.84%
- Domestic passengers: 1,973,927 ▲3.59%
- Aircraft movements: 12,868 ▲3.37%
- Freight (tonnes): 871 ▼8.80%
- Source: Airports of Thailand

Mae Fah Luang – Chiang Rai International Airport (IATA: CEI, ICAO: VTCT) is in Ban Du subdistrict, Mueang Chiang Rai district, Chiang Rai province in northern Thailand. The airport is about 8 km from the city center. Since 1998, it has been managed by the Airports of Thailand Public Company Limited (AOT). In 2013, the airport handled over 1,000,000 passengers and 7,000 passenger flights. The airport had international flight facilities and served a few international routes to Macau, Singapore, Kuala Lumpur, Kunming, Haikou, Hangzhou, Changsha, Xishuangbanna, Shenzhen, and Chengdu, all of which were suspended due to the COVID-19 pandemic. Since travel restrictions were imposed in China, there have been no international commercial flights connecting Chiang Rai to the global market. Thus, the airport has been seeking other possible routes to connect to such as to South Korea.

In 2014, Airports of Thailand (AOT) announced that they would expand Chiang Rai Airport. The plans include building an additional taxiway and more shops, and possibly extending the runway. This should be completed in 2030.

Chiang Rai International Airport was named "Mae Fah Luang", after Princess Srinagarindra, mother of the previous monarch, Bhumibol Adulyadej, reigning under the dynastic name of Rama IX.

== Expansion ==
Since the relaxation of COVID-19 travel restrictions, the airport is handling approximately 3,900 passengers per day. However, there are still no international flights operating to the airport. Airports of Thailand has approved expansion plans for the airport to attract international carriers and improve the experience for passengers using the airport's facilities. This includes improvements to the airport's entrance and exit roads, the construction of a Maintenance Repair Operation centre (MRO) for aircraft maintenance, and the construction of a parallel taxiway.

The construction of the aircraft maintenance facility is set to be completed by 31 July 2023. The facility will be able to service and repair large Airbus and Boeing aircraft from China. The airport will also become a cargo transportation hub for the northern region of Thailand.

== Statistics ==
=== Traffic by calendar year ===
Comparison of passenger volume, aircraft movements and cargo volume at Mae Fah Luang – Chiang Rai International Airport, by year
Year	Passengers	Change from previous year	Movements	Cargo (tons)	Notes
2003	417,345	–	3,710	4,238	
2004	554,364	▲32.83%	4,879	4,879	
2005	677,407	▲22.2%	4,927	5,070	
2006	696,492	▲2.82%	5,659	4,753	
2007	711,662	▲2.18%	6,232	2,919	
2008	772,286	▲8.52%	6,734	2,527	
2009	648,783	▼15.99%	5,546	2,287	
2010	724,241	▲11.63%	5,714	2,626	
2011	818,163	▲12.67%	5,819	4,306	
2012	986,436	▲20.57%	7,138	4,755	
2013	1,089,232	▲10.42%	7,181	4,440	
2014	1,379,022	▲26.6%	10,985	3,556	
2015	1,745,568	▲26.58%	13,402	4,491	
2016	2,060,200	▲18.02%	14,590	4,719	
2017	2,503,375	▲21.51%	17,661	4,288	
2018	2,867,289	▲14.54%	20,072	3,531	
2019	2,928,881	▲2.15%	20,128	2,535	
2020	1,513,294	▼48.33%	12,126	963	
2021	710,408	▼53.06%	6,131	586	
2022	1,686,726	▲137.43%	11,920	920	
2023	1,920,228	▲13.84%	12,485	875	
2024	1,912,859	▼0.38%	12,449	955	
2025	1,981,088	▲3.57%	12,868	871	

== Airlines and destinations ==
Airlines	Destinations	Refs
Nok Air	Bangkok–Don Mueang	
Scoot	Singapore	
Thai AirAsia	Bangkok–Don Mueang, Bangkok–Suvarnabhumi	
Thai Airways International	Bangkok–Suvarnabhumi	
Thai Lion Air	Bangkok–Don Mueang	
Thai VietJet Air	Bangkok–Suvarnabhumi, Phuket	

== Accidents and incidents ==
The Boeing 737-800 of Nok Air that was involved in the accident on 30 July 2022, seen parked idly with logos covered up at the airport in November 2022

- 30 July 2022: Nok Air Flight 108, a Boeing 737-800 (registered HS-DBR) from Bangkok Don Muang to Chiang Rai with 164 passengers and six crew, landed on Chiang Rai's runway 03 at 21:04L (14:04Z) but veered left off the runway and came to a stop all wheels off the paved runway. There were no injuries reported. The airport was closed until the aircraft and foreign object debris (FOD) could be moved away from the runway. The airport reopened and continued operations as normal six days later.

== See also ==
- Old Chiang Rai Airport (no longer operational)
