= Lucky Air =

Chinese low-cost airline

Lucky Air 祥鹏航空公司

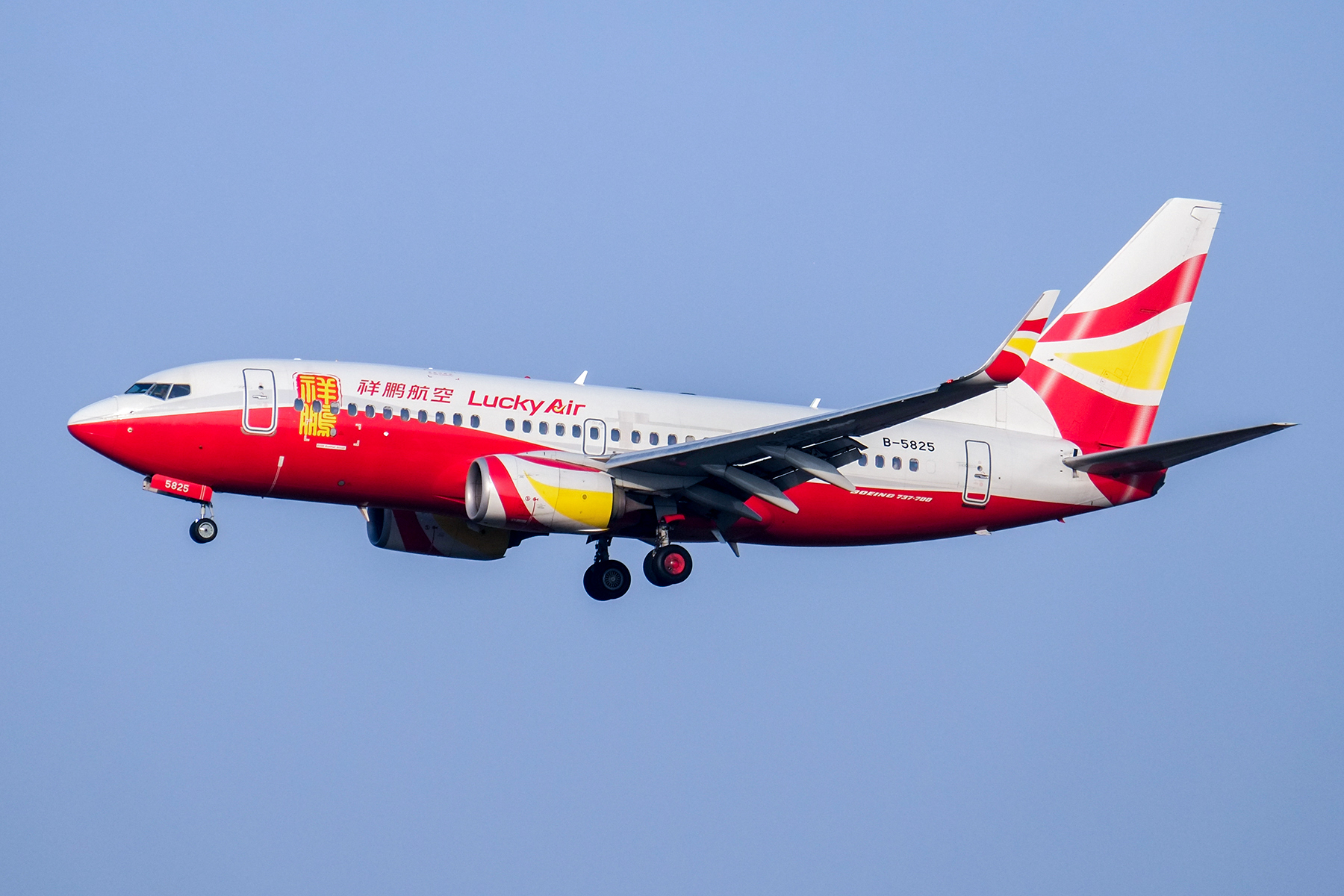
- Lucky Air 737-74P in standard livery
IATA	ICAO	Call sign
8L	LKE	LUCKY AIR
- Founded: July 2004; 22 years ago (as Shilin Airlines)
- Commenced operations: 26 February 2006; 20 years ago
- Operating bases: Chengdu–Tianfu; Kunming; Lijiang; Zhengzhou
- Frequent-flyer program: Fortune Wings Club
- Fleet size: 51
- Destinations: 61
- Parent company: HNA Aviation
- Headquarters: Kunming, Yunnan, China
- Key people: Ma Guohua (Chairman)
- Website: www.luckyair.net

Lucky Air
- Chinese: 祥鹏航空公司
Transcriptions
Standard Mandarin
- Hanyu Pinyin: Xiángpéng Hángkōng Gōngsī
- Wade–Giles: Hsiang^{2}-pʻêng^{2} Hang^{2}-kʻung^{1} Kung^{1}-ssŭ^{1}

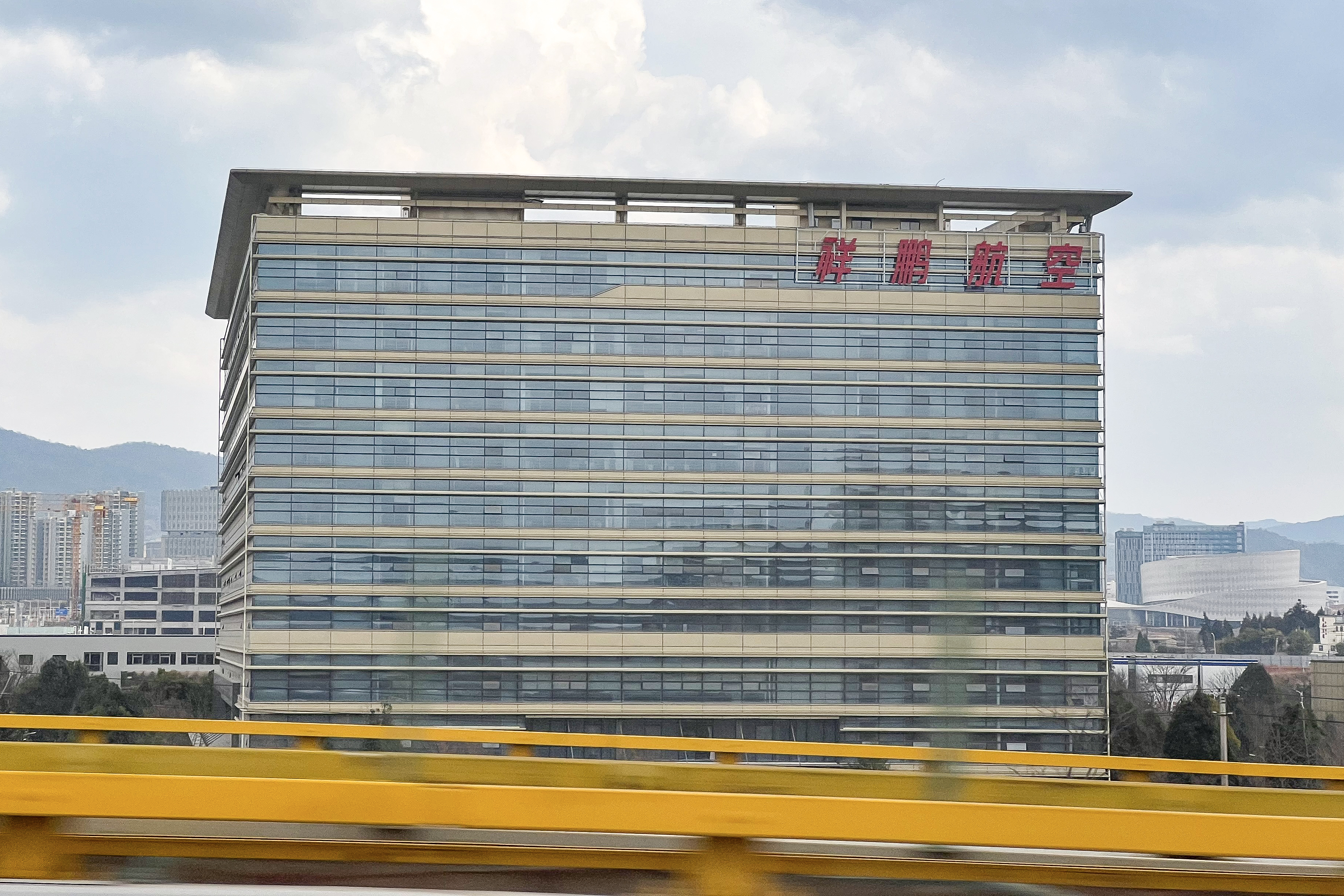
Headquarters

Lucky Air (Chinese: 祥鹏航空公司; pinyin: Xiángpéng Hángkōng Gōngsī) is a Chinese low-cost airline based in Kunming, Yunnan, China. The airline started with flights connecting Kunming with Dali and Xishuangbanna, and later expanded to other domestic and international destinations. Its main base is Kunming Changshui International Airport. The airline is one of the four founding members of the U-FLY Alliance.

== History ==
The airline was established in July 2004 as a start-up airline known as Shilin Airlines. Hainan Airlines had invested 2.93 million yuan in the company, while its affiliate Shanxi Airlines invested 47.07 million yuan. The airlines provided the new company with three Dornier aircraft, a Boeing aircraft, and a Dash-8. The Yunnan Shilin Tourism Aviation Co. also invested a further 1 million yuan.

On 23 December 2005, Shilin Airlines was renamed Lucky Air. It started operations with a flight between Kunming and Dali within Yunnan on 26 February 2006.

The airline is owned by Hainan Airlines, Shanxi Airlines and Yunnan Shilin Tourism Aviation. It has 263 employees (at March 2007).

The airline is one of the four founding members of the U-FLY Alliance, which is the world's first alliance of low-cost carriers. It formed in January 2016 by HK Express, Lucky Air, Urumqi Air, and West Air. Lucky intended to deploy 787-9s to Europe and North America by the end of 2016.

On 10 January 2025, Lucky Air flight 8L843 left Dali Fengyi Airport for Kuala Lumpur, marking the first international direct air route from the prefecture.

== Destinations ==
As of April 2026, the airline serves destinations in China, Vietnam and Indonesia.

== Fleet ==
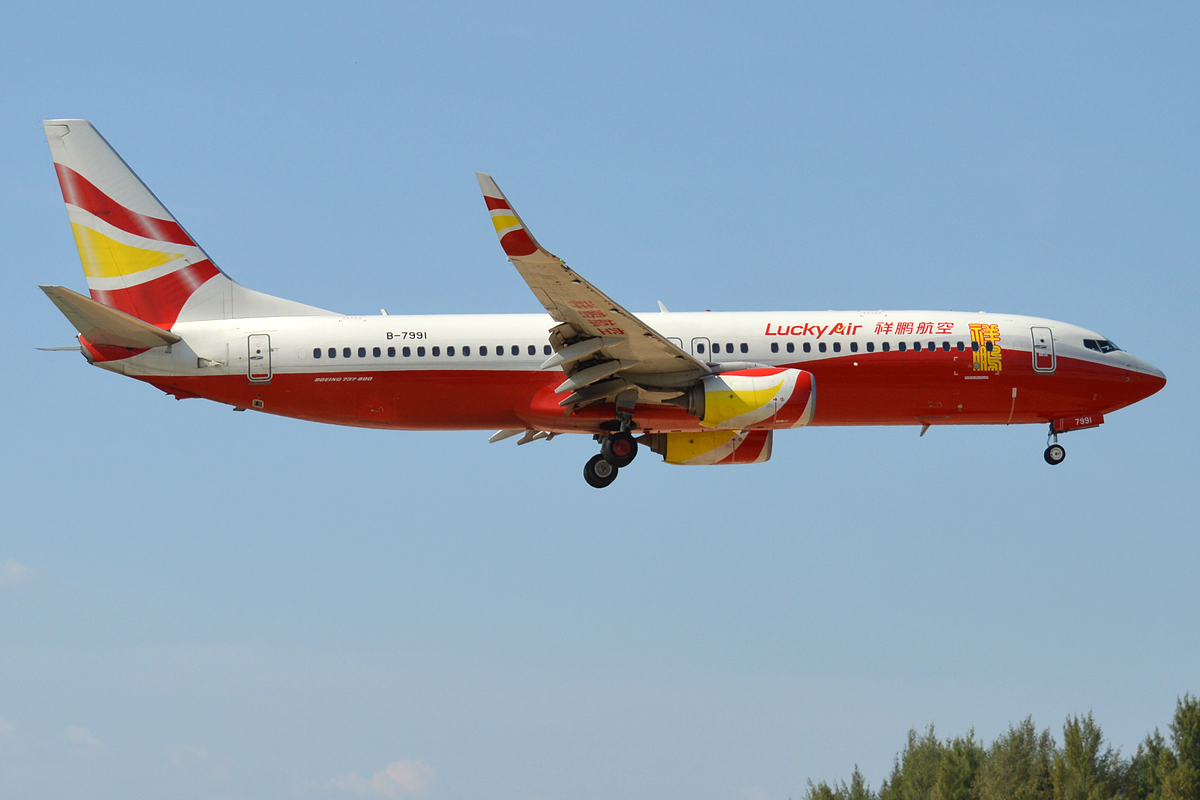
Lucky Air Boeing 737-800

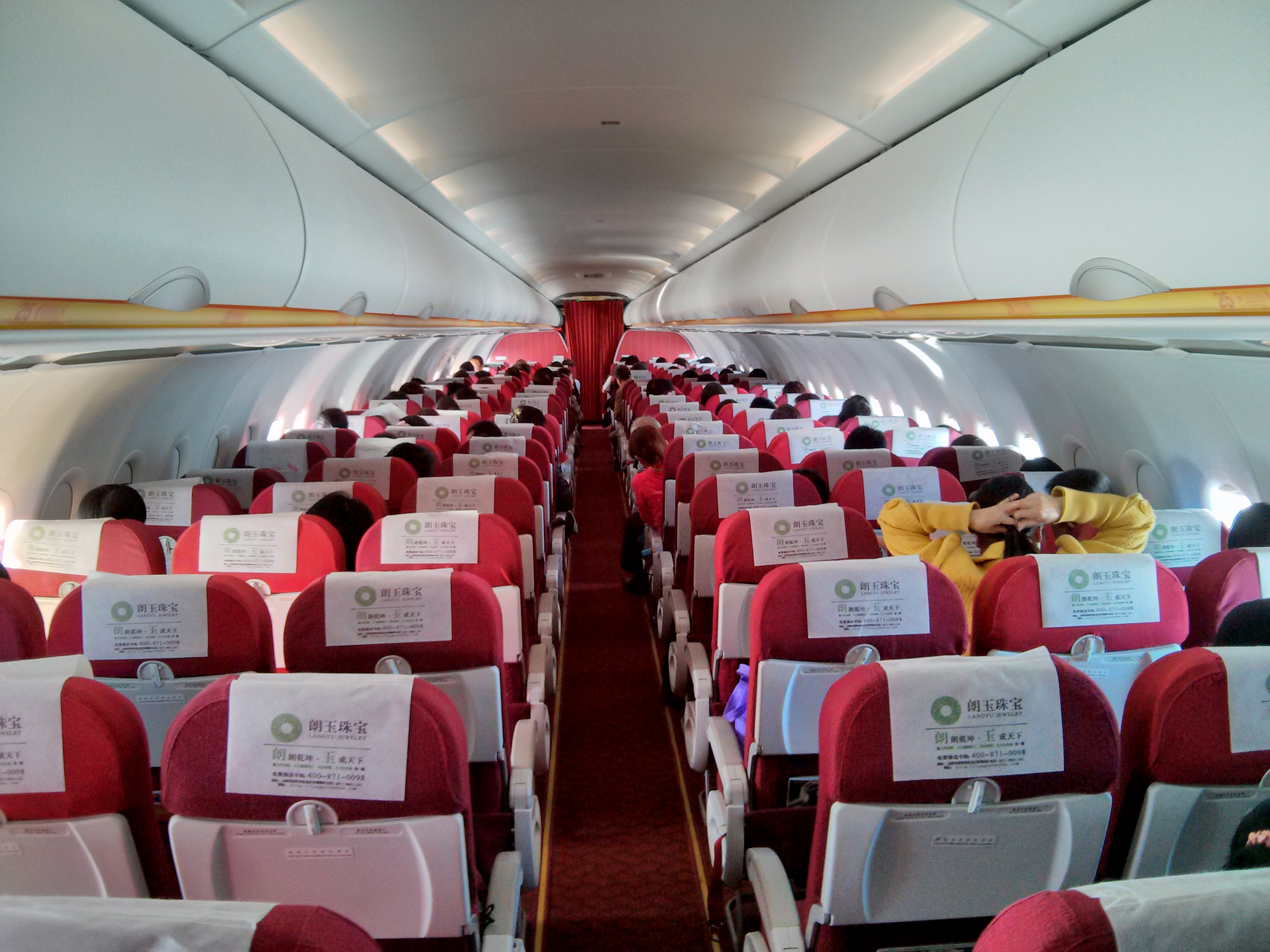
Lucky Air Airbus A320-200 cabin

As of August 2025, Lucky Air operates the following aircraft:

Lucky Air fleet
Aircraft	In Service	Orders	Passengers			Notes
Aircraft	In Service	Orders	J	Y	Total	Notes
Airbus A320-200	7	—	6	150	158	
Airbus A320neo	6	—	—	186	186	
Airbus A321neo	1	—	—			
Airbus A330-300	4	—	24	279	303	
Boeing 737-700	9	—	8	120	128	
Boeing 737-700	9	—	—	148	148	
Boeing 737-800	20	—	8	156	164	
Boeing 737 MAX 8	4	—	8	168	176	
Total	51	—				

== Controversies ==
On 1 August 2026, the flight number 8L9664 from Urumqi to Chengdu was delayed by 4 hours due to bad weather. According to official information, the planned departure time for this flight was to be at 20:45 on 1 August and landing at 00:10 the next day, but a change of schedule was announced 18 minutes before planned departure at 20:27, adjusting the new departure and landing times to 23:55 and 04:05 the next day respecively. The actual departure time ended up being 00:52 on 2 August, arriving at 03:45. The in-flight meal provided by the staff to passengers was found to be expired instant noodles. After that, Lucky Air issued 200 RMB in compensation to passengers found with meal issues.
