= West Air (China) =

Chinese low-cost airline

West Air 西部航空有限责任公司

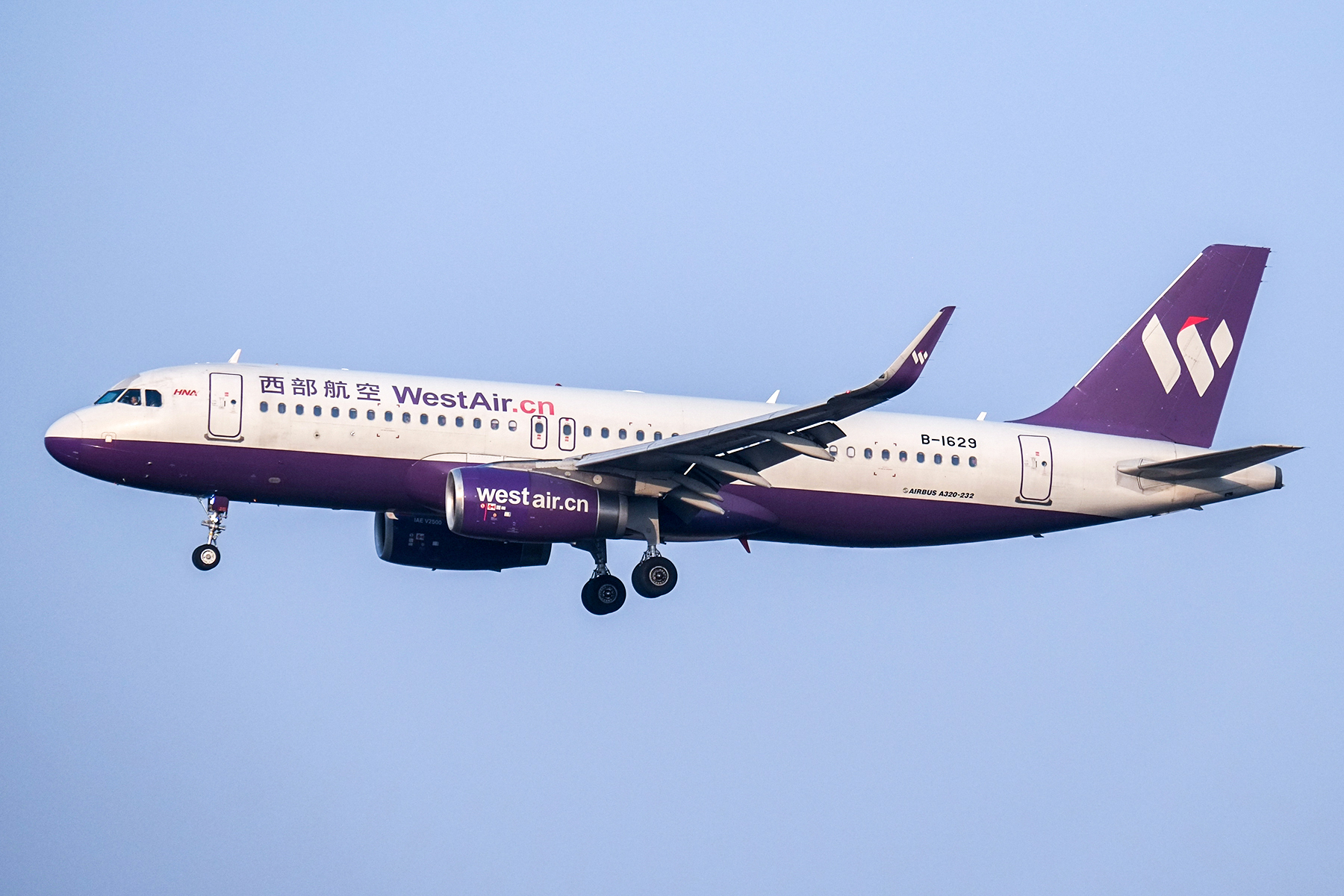
IATA	ICAO	Call sign
PN	CHB	WEST CHINA
- Founded: 27 March 2007; 19 years ago
- Commenced operations: 14 June 2007; 19 years ago
- Hubs: Chongqing; Zhengzhou
- Frequent-flyer program: Fortune Wings Club
- Fleet size: 50
- Destinations: 71
- Parent company: HNA Aviation; Chongqing Yufu Assets Management Group
- Headquarters: Chongqing, China
- Website: westair.cn

West Air is a low-cost airline based in Liangjiang, Chongqing, China, operating a scheduled passenger network to domestic and international destinations out of its main hub, Chongqing Jiangbei International Airport, as well as its second hub in Zhengzhou. The company was established in March 2007 by its parent company HNA Aviation, with the launch of scheduled services on 14 June 2007. The airline was one of the four founding members of the U-FLY Alliance.

On 4 February 2016, West Air launched its inaugural international flight between Chongqing and Singapore.

== Destinations ==
As of April 2026, the airlines serves destinations in East Asia and Southeast Asia.

== Fleet ==
=== Current fleet ===
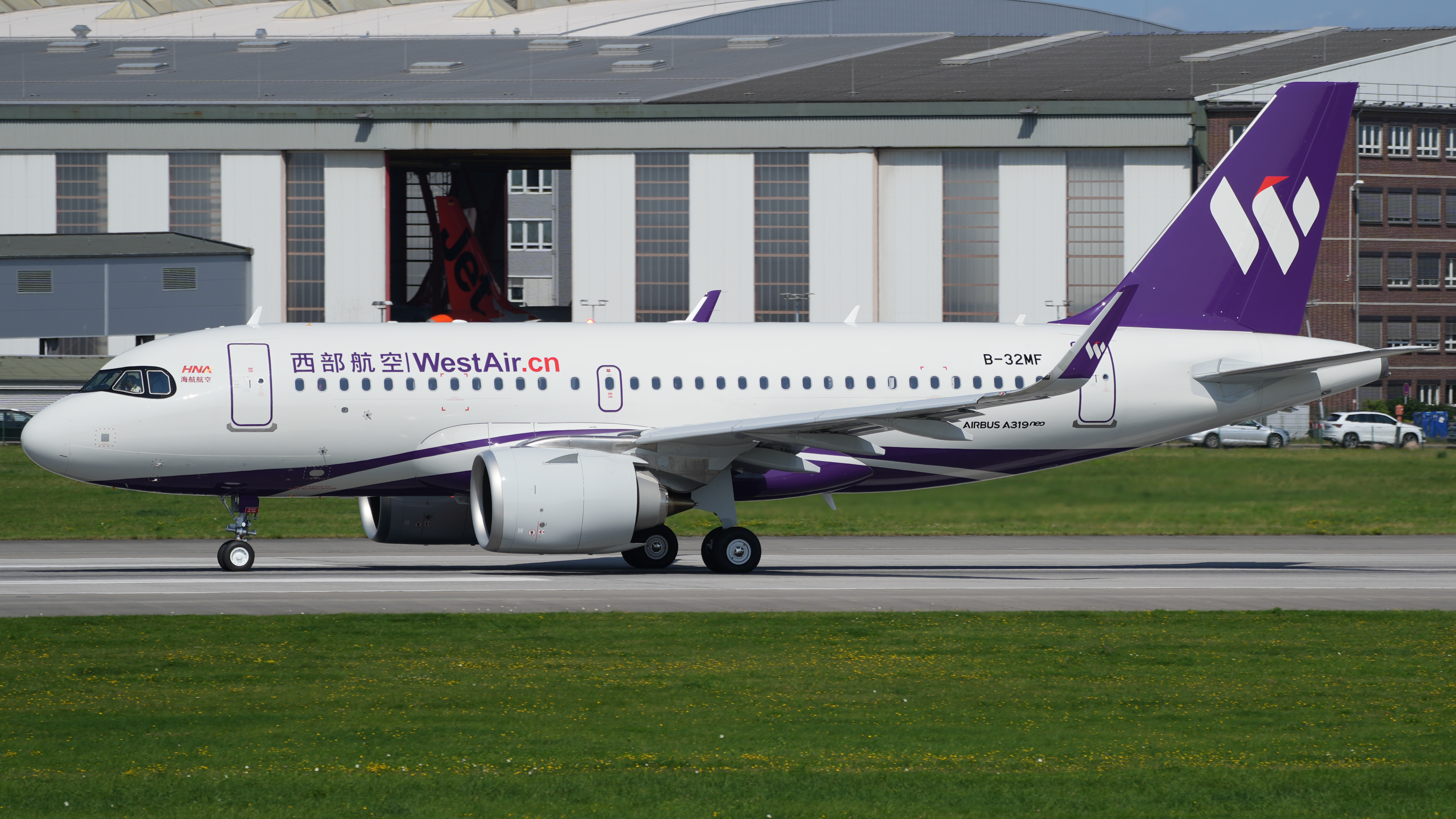
West Air Airbus A319neo on delivery at Airbus Hamburg-Finkenwerder, August 2025

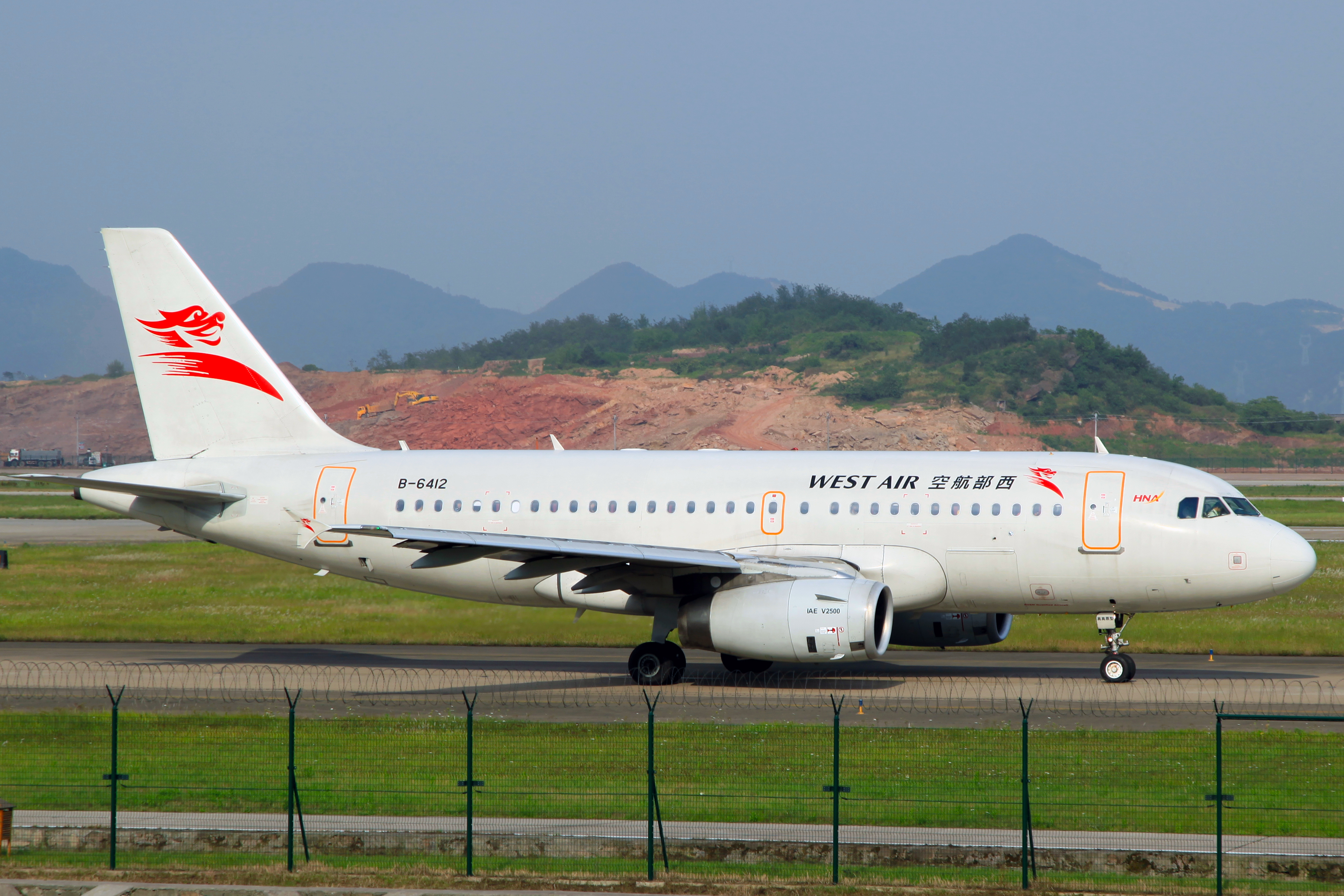
West Air Airbus A319-100 in old livery taxiing at Chongqing Jiangbei International Airport, May 2013

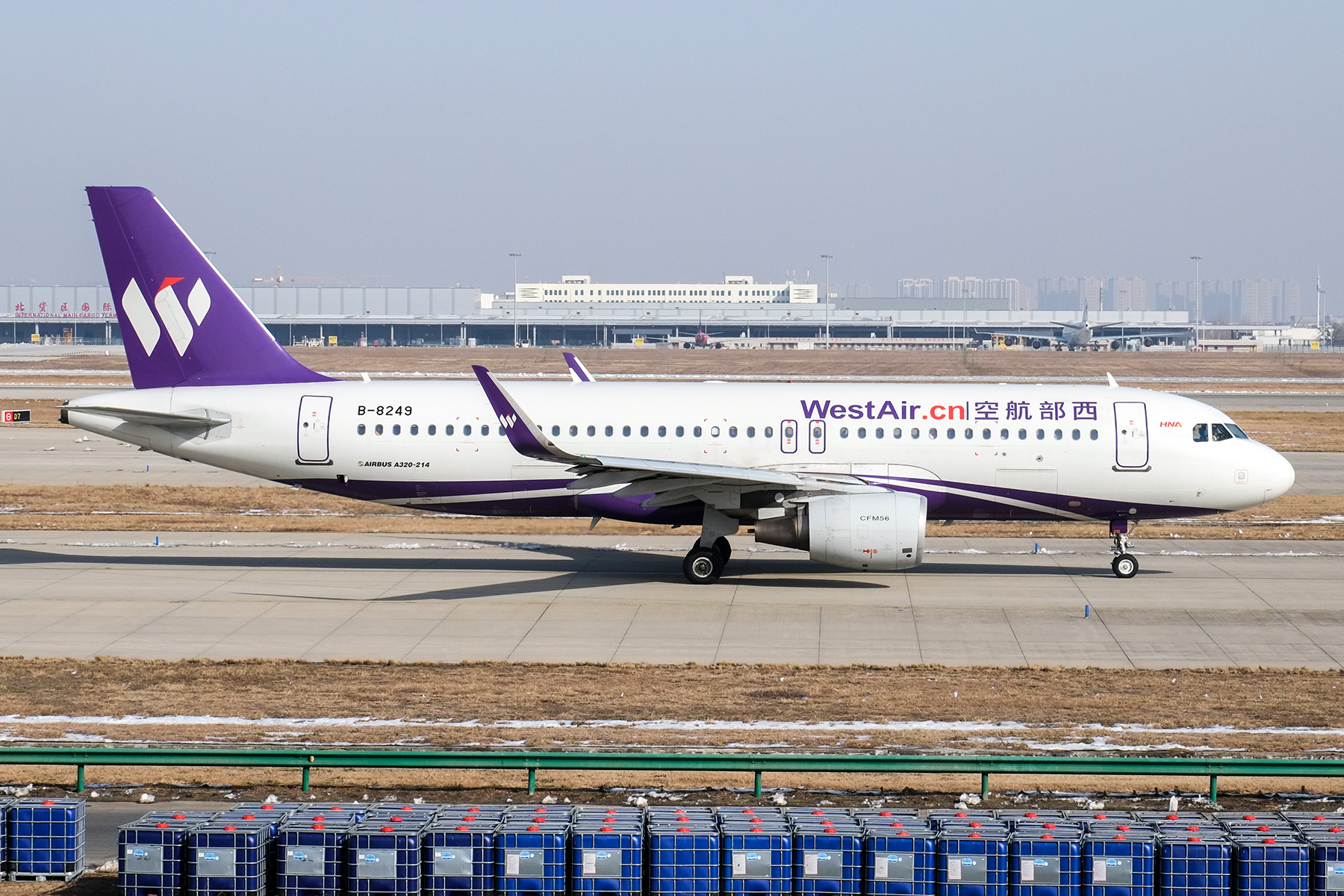
West Air Airbus A320-200 in December 2023

As of July 2026, West Air (China) operates the following aircraft:

West Air fleet
Aircraft	In service	Orders	Passengers	Notes
Airbus A319	4	—	144	
Airbus A319neo	2	—	144	
Airbus A320	26	—	186	
Airbus A320neo	10	—	186	
Airbus A321	4	—	230	Three former Interjet and one former Avianca aircraft.
Airbus A321neo	4	—	107	
Total	50	—		

=== Fleet history ===
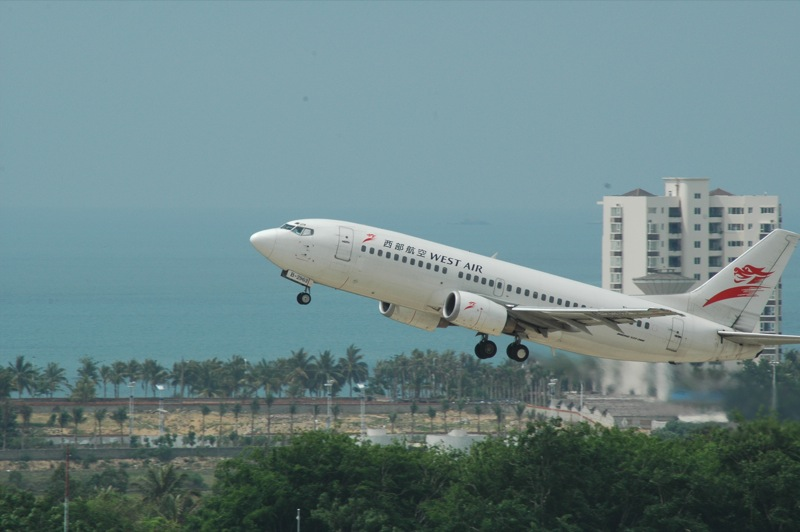
West Air Boeing 737-300 taking off from Sanya Phoenix International Airport, May 2008

West Air has previously operated the following aircraft:

- 5 Boeing 737-300

== Loyalty programs ==
The Fortune Wings Club is the loyalty program for West Air and its sister airlines, including Capital Airlines, Tianjin Airlines, Grand China Air, Grand China Express, Hainan Airlines, Hong Kong Airlines, Hong Kong Express and Lucky Air. Membership benefits include air ticket redemption and upgrade; VIP members have additional privileges of dedicated First or Business Class check in counters, lounge access, bonus mileage and extra baggage allowance.

== See also ==
- List of airlines of China
