= U-FLY Alliance =

Regional airline alliance in east Asia

- Launch date: 18 January 2016
- Disbanded: 1 January 2024
- Full members: 4
- Destination airports: 149
- Destination countries: 18
- Annual passengers (M): 44
- Fleet size: 129
- Headquarters: Hong Kong
- Management: Andrew Cowen (CEO); Ma Zhimin (Executive Chairman & President)
- Alliance slogan: U fly the world

U-FLY Alliance (simplified Chinese: 优行联盟; traditional Chinese: 優行聯盟) was a regional airline alliance based in Hong Kong, and made up of low-cost airlines from Hong Kong, Mainland China, and South Korea. Upon founding, it became the world's first alliance of low-cost carriers, formed in January 2016 between founding members HK Express, Lucky Air, Urumqi Air, and West Air. All four founding airlines except HK Express are affiliated with the HNA Group, with a focus on Hong Kong, mainland China, and Southeast Asia, but they were currently seeking new members which are not affiliated with HNA Group. Eastar Jet, a South Korean low-cost carrier, joined the alliance on 27 July 2016.

In July 2019, the main founder HK Express withdrew from U-FLY Alliance after becoming a wholly owned low-cost subsidiary of Cathay Pacific (a member of the Oneworld alliance), and U-FLY Alliance disbanded by 2024.

== History ==
The alliance was formed for various reasons. Since China's provinces vary in what they allow and do not allow for airlines, it is difficult for two or more airlines from different regions to merge. The alliance was formed to help smaller airlines grow larger without becoming one company in several different provinces. Another motivator for creating an alliance instead of merging is that the regions preferred to have a local airline with a local identity that can advocate for the area it is in. U-FLY Alliance was announced on 18 January 2016 at a press conference in Hong Kong. The founding members were all part of HNA Group, a Chinese conglomerate, until HK Express was acquired by Cathay Pacific in 2019. However, the alliance bore no outward affiliation with the group, and it was open to airlines outside of it.

In 2017, U-FLY Alliance partners' capacity included over 44 million seats, touching 18 countries, 149 airports and 339 city pairs. With over 129 aircraft currently in operation, the alliance's members hoped to have a fleet of over 218 aircraft by 2020. Of the 218 aircraft, Lucky Air hoped to grow to 60 aircraft, West Air to 60, HK Express to 50, and Urumqi Air to 48.

== Member airlines ==
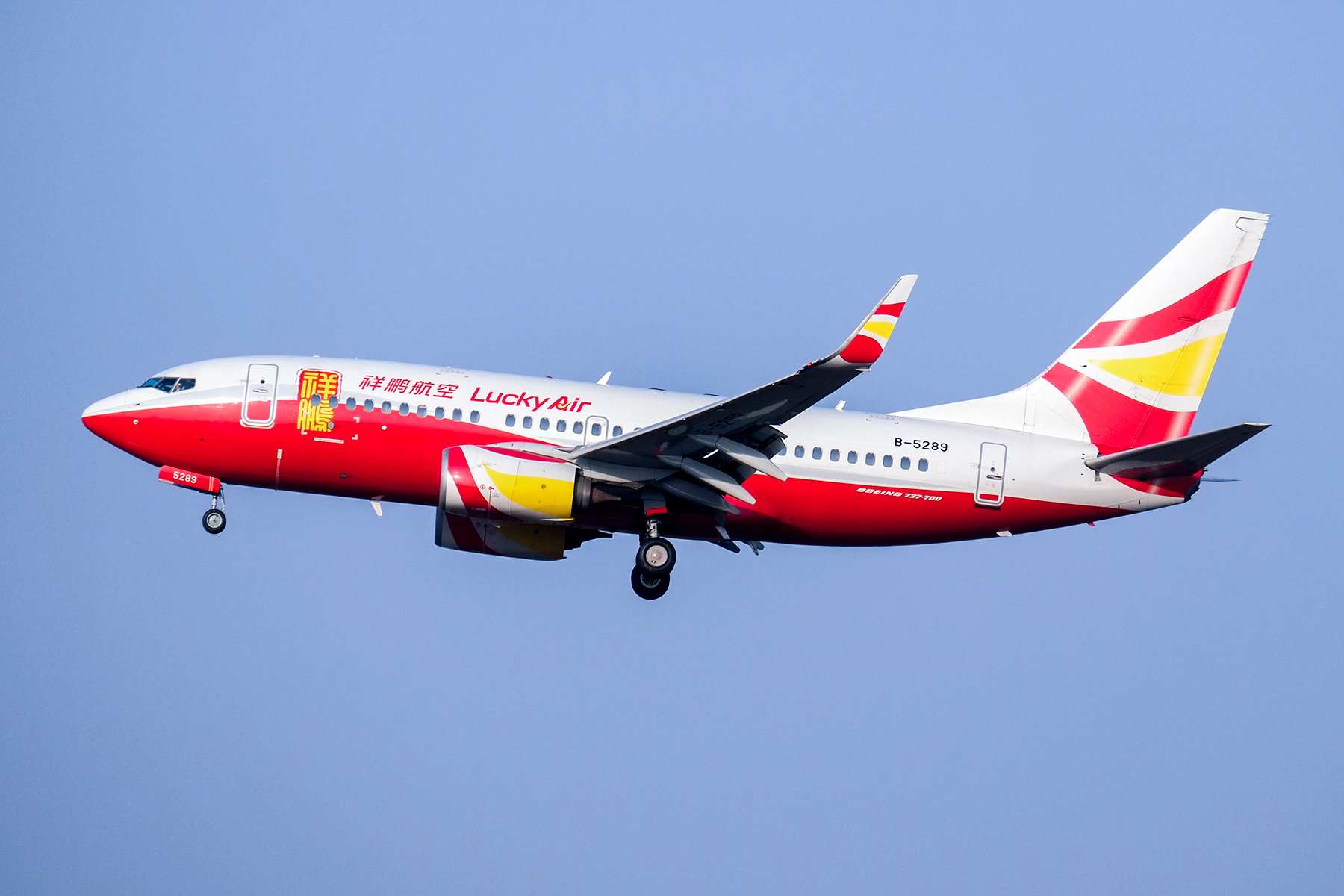
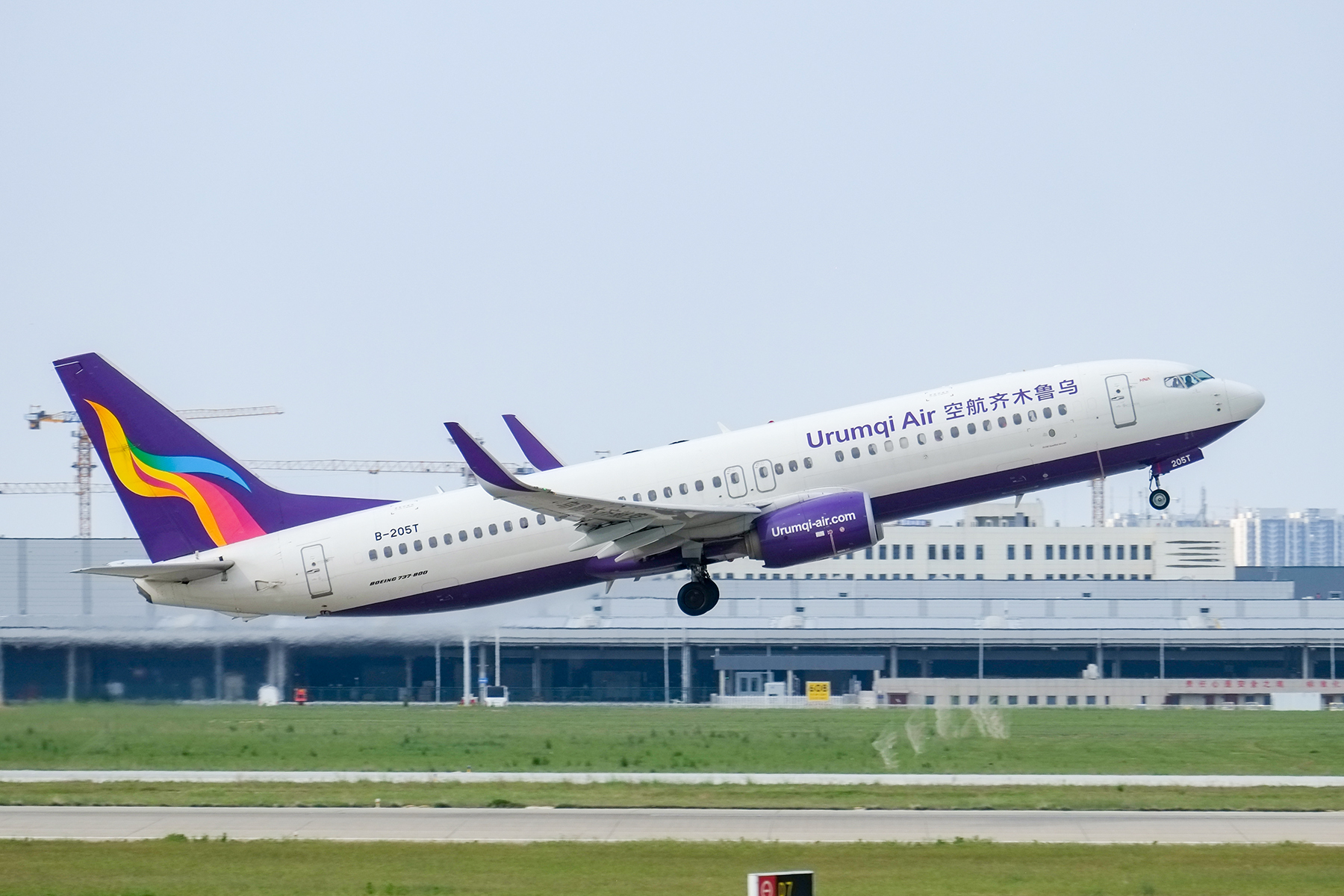
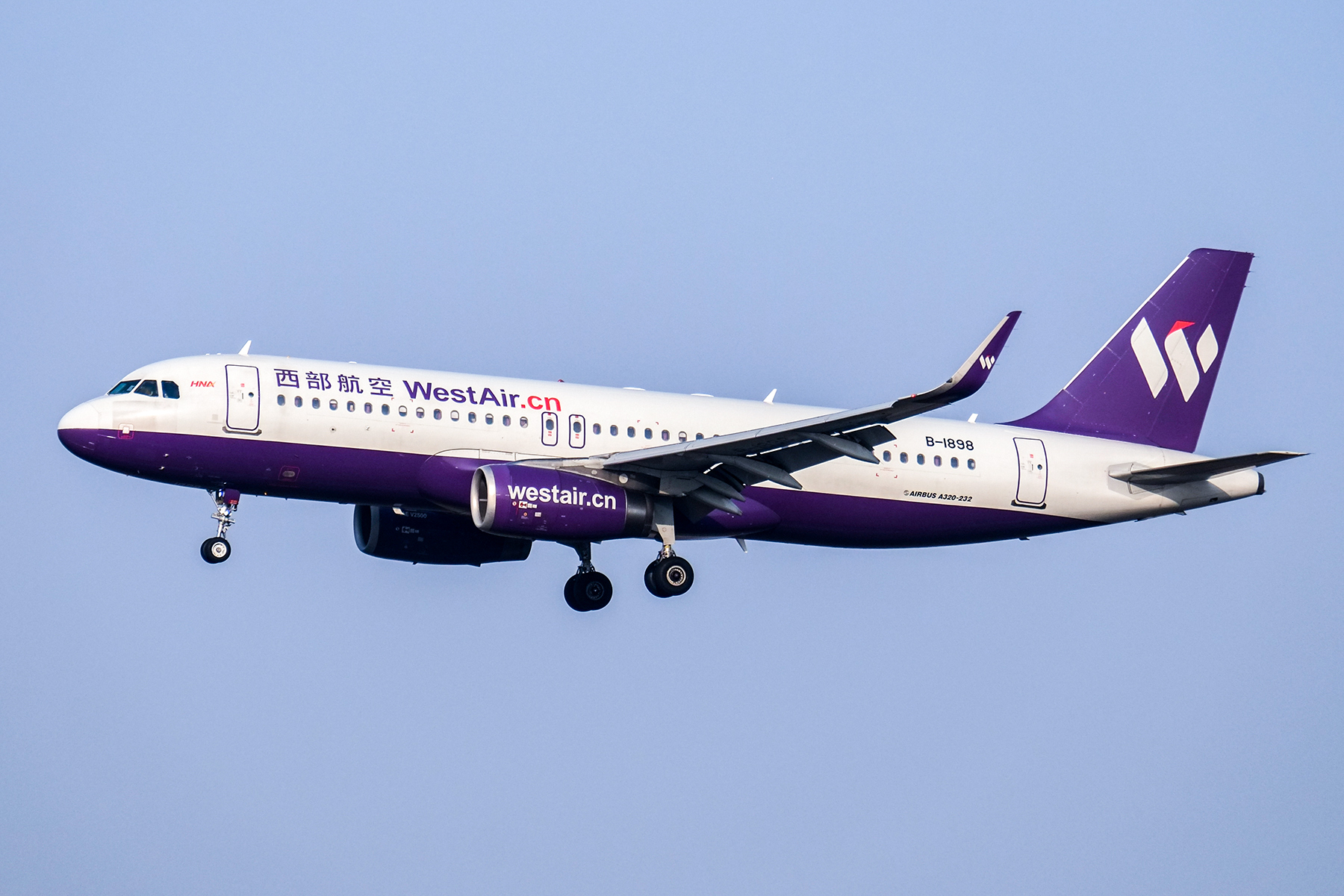
HK Express, Lucky Air, Urumqi Air and West Air; the founding members of the U-FLY Alliance.

=== Former members ===
The following airlines were members of U-FLY Alliance:

Member airline	Joined	Exited	Notes
Eastar Jet	27 July 2016	Unknown	
Lucky Air	18 January 2016	Unknown	
Urumqi Air	18 January 2016	Unknown	
West Air	18 January 2016	Unknown	
HK Express	18 January 2016	19 July 2019	Left the alliance to become a wholly owned low-cost subsidiary of Cathay Pacific, a Oneworld member.
