= Urumqi Air =

Chinese low-cost airline

Urumqi Air 乌鲁木齐航空 烏魯木齊航空

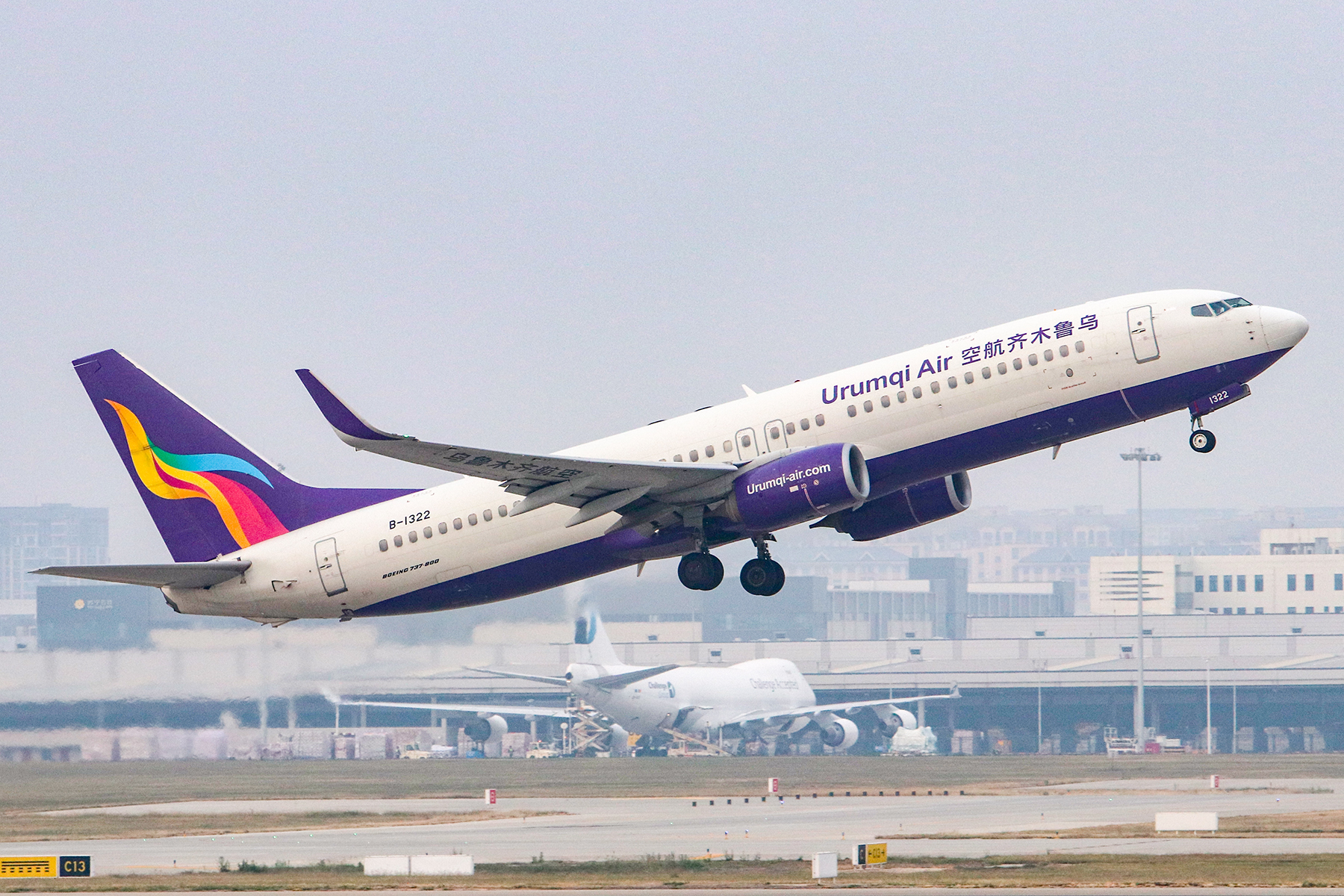
IATA	ICAO	Call sign
UQ	CUH	LOU LAN
- Founded: 2014; 12 years ago
- Commenced operations: August 29, 2014; 12 years ago
- Operating bases: Ürümqi Tianshan International Airport
- Fleet size: 17 (As of May 2026
- Destinations: 47 (As of May 2026)
- Parent company: HNA Aviation
- Headquarters: Ürümqi, Xinjiang, China
- Website: www.urumqi-air.com

Urumqi Air (simplified Chinese: 乌鲁木齐航空; traditional Chinese: 烏魯木齊航空) is a Chinese low-cost airline headquartered in Ürümqi, Xinjiang Uyghur Autonomous Region, China. It operates scheduled passenger services. Its main hub is Ürümqi Tianshan International Airport in Ürümqi. The airline is one of the four founding members of the U-FLY Alliance. As of 2019, the airline exceeded eight million passengers and has operated an accumulated 150,000 flight hours.

== Destinations ==
As of April 2026, the airline serves destinations in China and Thailand.

== Fleet ==
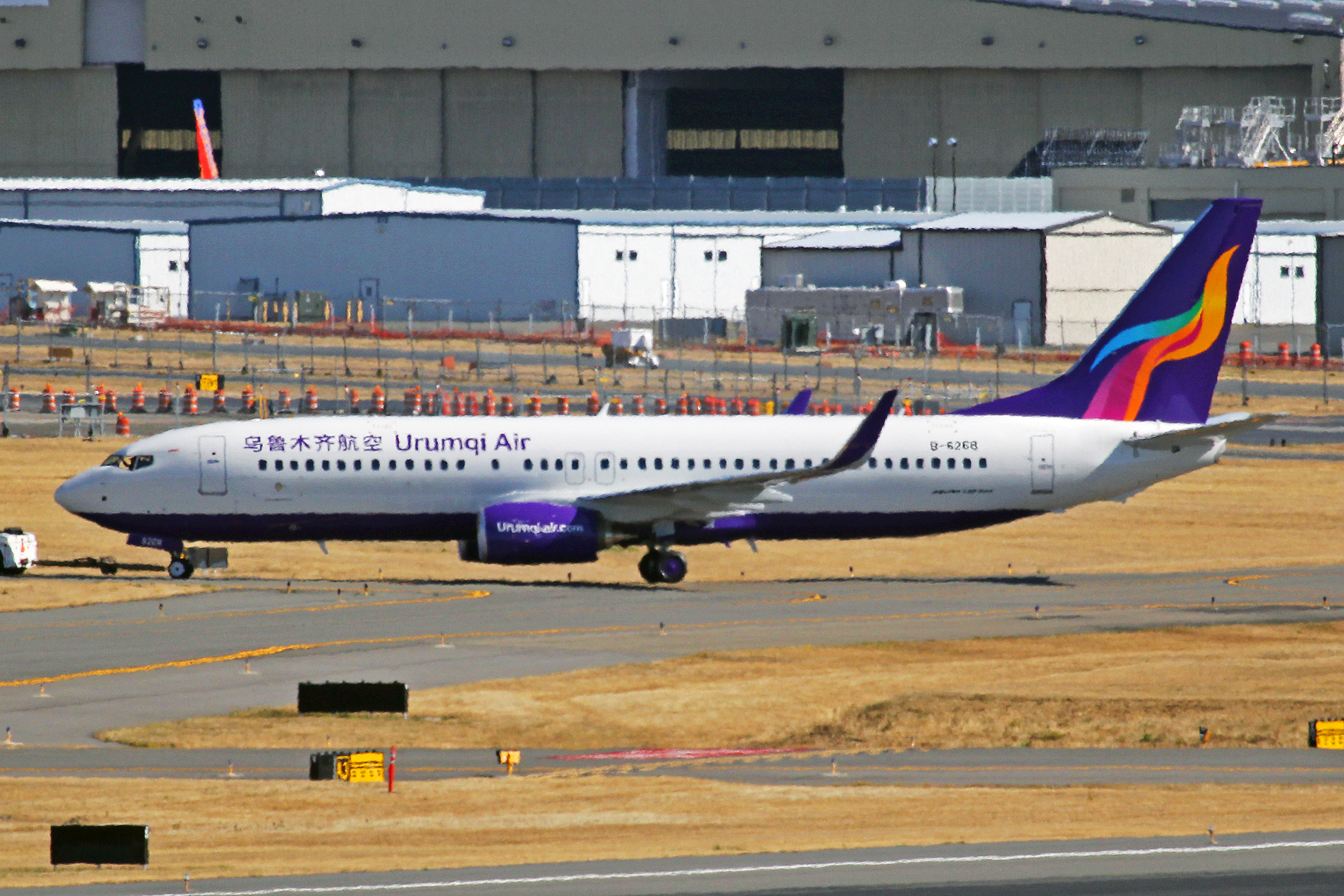
Urumqi Air Boeing 737-800

As of June 2026, Urumqi Air operates the following aircraft:

Urumqi Air fleet
Aircraft	In service	Orders	Passengers	Notes
Boeing 737-800	17	—	186	
Comac C909	1	40	90	Deliveries from 2025 until 2032.
Total	18	40		
