= HK Express =

Low-cost airline of Hong Kong

Hong Kong Express Airways Limited 香港快運航空有限公司

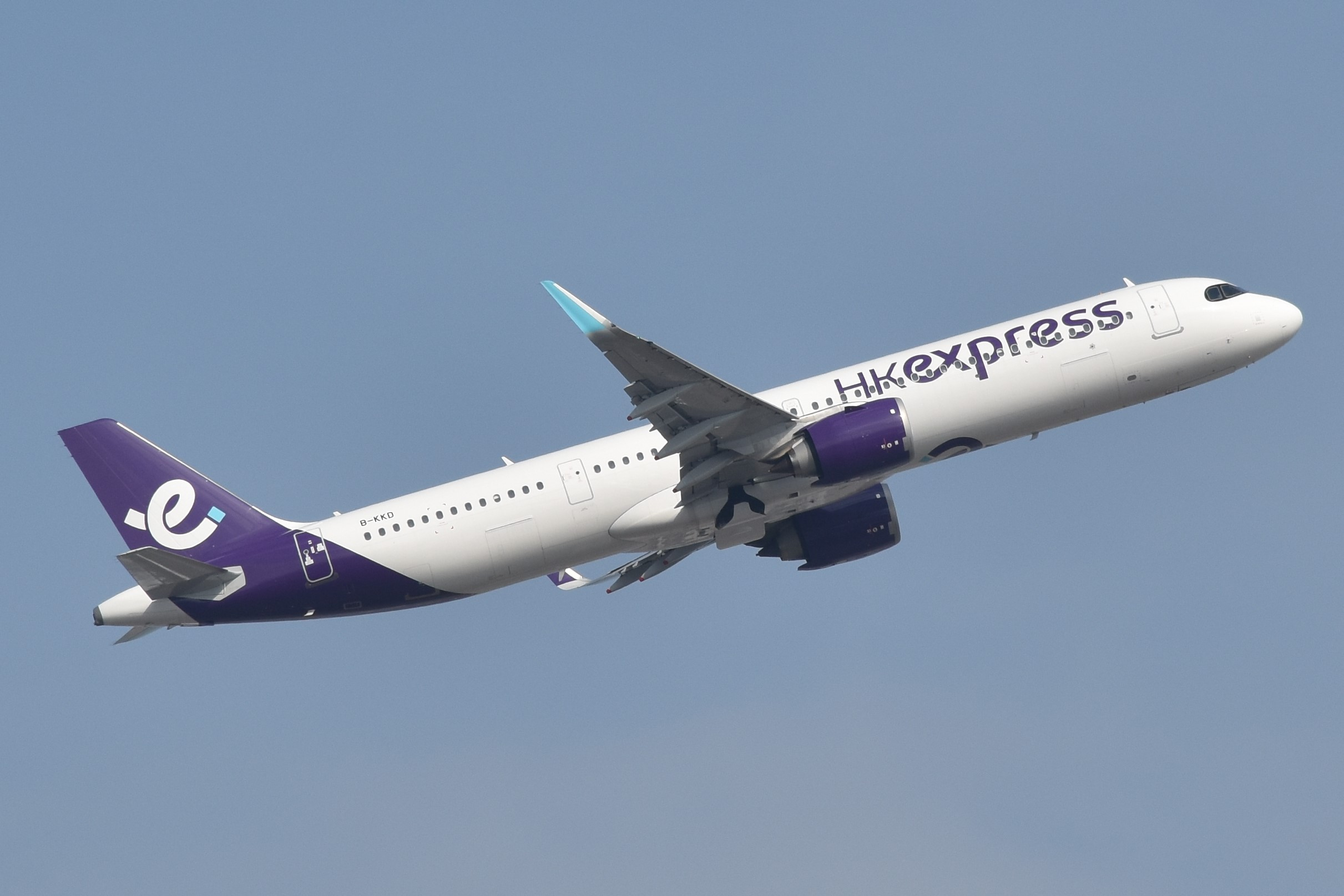
- HK Express Airbus A321neo
IATA	ICAO	Call sign
UO	HKE	HONGKONG SHUTTLE
- Founded: 10 March 2004; 22 years ago
- Commenced operations: 3 September 2005; 21 years ago
- AOC #: 7
- Hubs: Hong Kong International Airport
- Frequent-flyer program: Asia Miles
- Fleet size: 42
- Destinations: 29
- Parent company: Cathay Pacific
- Headquarters: Cathay House, 11 Tung Fai Road, Hong Kong International Airport, Chek Lap Kok, Hong Kong
- Key people: Jeanette Mao (CEO)
- Website: www.hkexpress.com

Hong Kong Express Airways
- Traditional Chinese: 香港快運航空
- Simplified Chinese: 香港快运航空
Transcriptions
Standard Mandarin
- Hanyu Pinyin: Xiānggǎng Kuàiyùn Hángkōng
Yue: Cantonese
- Yale Romanization: Hēunggóng Faaiwahn Hòhnghūng
- Jyutping: hoeng^{1}gong^{2} faai^{3}wan^{6} hong^{4}hung^{1}

Hong Kong Express
- Traditional Chinese: 香港快運
- Simplified Chinese: 香港快运
Transcriptions
Standard Mandarin
- Hanyu Pinyin: Xiānggǎng Kuàiyùn
Yue: Cantonese
- Yale Romanization: Hēunggóng Faaiwahn
- Jyutping: hoeng1 gong2 faai3 wan6

former name
- Traditional Chinese: 港聯航空
- Simplified Chinese: 港联航空
Transcriptions
Standard Mandarin
- Hanyu Pinyin: gǎnglián hángkōng
Yue: Cantonese
- Jyutping: gong^{2}lyun^{4} hong^{4}hung^{1}

Hong Kong Express Airways or HK Express (HKE) is a Hong Kong–based low-cost airline fully owned by Cathay Pacific Airways. It provides scheduled air service to 27 destinations in Asia, including China, Japan, the Philippines, Malaysia, South Korea, Taiwan, Thailand and Vietnam. The airline's main hub at Hong Kong International Airport uses a fleet that consists exclusively of the Airbus A320 family. The company slogan is Gotta Go (replacing Your Move).

The head office of HK Express is located in Cathay House, 11 Tung Fai Road, Hong Kong International Airport, Chek Lap Kok, Hong Kong.

== History ==
=== 2004–2006: Founding ===
Hong Kong Express Airways Limited was incorporated on 10 March 2004, with the former Chinese name (港聯航空公司), added on 21 April 2004. The airline was owned by Macau casino entrepreneur Stanley Ho. In July 2004, Hong Kong's helicopter operator Heli Hong Kong officially announced plans to commence fixed-wing operation via Hong Kong Express, to become Hong Kong's fourth passenger airline. It was planning to introduce regional jet services to secondary cities in mainland China and was in negotiations with Bombardier and Embraer for the lease of several 50- or 70-seat regional jets. In April 2005, the airline was granted permission to transport passengers, cargo and mail from Hong Kong to selected destinations in China and permitted to apply for traffic rights to serve 15 Chinese cities. The next month, it received approval to operate scheduled air services to five cities in China, including Chongqing, Guangzhou, Hangzhou, Nanjing and Ningbo. The airline had its Air Operator's Certificate varied in July 2005 for the operation of Embraer E170 aircraft. The same month, it took delivery of its first of four 76-seat twin-jet Embraer E170, leased from General Electric Commercial Aviation Services (GECAS), and became the Asian launch operator of this regional jet. Two more aircraft were delivered in 2005, with the remaining delivered in May 2006.

The airline's initial use of its first Embraer E170 was on charter services to Taichung, Taiwan, on 3 September 2005. The first scheduled passenger services began to Guangzhou on 8 September 2005, with services to Hangzhou and Ningbo following in October 2005 and December 2005, respectively. On 19 November 2005, Hong Kong Air Transport Licensing Authority (ATLA) granted the airline additional licences to operate scheduled services to 16 destinations in mainland China, as well as Koh Samui, Okinawa, Siem Reap and Taichung. Scheduled passenger services to Chiang Mai and Chongqing were inaugurated on 22 June 2006 and 31 July 2006, respectively.

=== 2006–2013: Acquired by HNA and expansion ===
On 3 August 2006, HNA Group, the parent company of Hainan Airlines, announced a finalised agreement to acquire a 45 percent stake in Hong Kong Express; this followed an earlier purchase of a 45 percent holdings in CR Airways in June. Under the terms of the agreement, the airline would remain a Hong Kong registered airline and there would be no changes to the current operations. Analysts said that the HNA Group had the weakest international network amongst all the mainland airlines. By purchasing both Hong Kong Express and CR Airways, it would enable Hainan Airlines to expand internationally via its junior partners from Hong Kong.

On 23 January 2008, the airline was the third Hong Kong carrier permitted by the Civil Aviation Department to operate flights to and from Beijing and Shanghai. To facilitate the expansion, it announced that six Boeing 737-800 would be added to its fleet before the end of the year.

=== 2013–2019: Low-cost carrier transformation ===
Logo used from 2013 to 2023

On 26 June 2013, Hong Kong Express announced its intention to transform into a low-cost carrier (LCC), and renamed to "HK Express", under the direction of deputy CEO Andrew Cowen. Hong Kong Express' first flights as a LCC commenced 27 October 2013, to five destinations in Asia. The airline has since added routes to Tokyo, Penang, Osaka, Fukuoka, Seoul and Busan. There are plans for the airline's fleet to increase by five Airbus A320 in 2014, taking the total number of aircraft to 11 within the year and with a longer-term aim of having over 30 Airbus A320 by 2018.

On 19 July 2017, during the annual Hong Kong Book Fair, HK Express launched an activities planning service known as U-Explore in collaboration with Hong Kong–based travel activities booking platform, Klook.

On 9 November 2017, HK Express was banned by the Civil Aviation Department from adding new flights, routes or aircraft until 30 April 2018. This followed the cancellation of 18 flights to Osaka, Nagoya and Seoul during National Day Golden Week that year, affecting about 2,000 passengers. However, the delivery of four new aircraft was later permitted, provided they were used on existing routes only.

=== 2019–present: Acquisition by Cathay Pacific ===
On 27 March 2019, Cathay Pacific agreed teatms purchase HK Express for HK$4.93 billion with the transaction to close by the end of 2019. At the time, HK Express operated 13 Airbus A320 and 10 Airbus A321 aircraft on 25 routes from Hong Kong to Japan and Southeast Asia. HK Express withdrew from U-FLY Alliance. Following the acquisition, Cathay Pacific has stated that it intends to continue the operation of HK Express as a stand-alone low-cost carrier separate from its existing full-service operations.

On 19 July 2019, Cathay Pacific announced the acquisition of Hong Kong Express Airways had been completed. HK Express is now a wholly owned subsidiary of Cathay Pacific. However, HK Express will continue to operate as a low-cost carrier stand-alone airline.

==== Impact of COVID-19 and aftermath ====
HK Express suspended all flight operations from 23 March to 30 April 2020 due to reduced demand caused by the COVID-19 pandemic.

On 10 June 2020, HK Express announced another suspension of flight operations, which was followed with a Flight Operations Resumption Plan, and announced resumption of all operations gradually from 2 August 2020.

HK Express has then recovered, despite the ongoing pandemic in Hong Kong, and announced new services to Taipei, Kaohsiung, and Singapore.

== Corporate affairs ==
=== Business trends ===
The key trends for HK Express are (as of the financial year ending 31 December):

	Revenue (Note: "Segment revenue") (HK$ m)	Net profit (Note: "Profit/(loss) attributable to the shareholders of Cathay Pacific") (HK$ m)	Number of passengers (Note: "Revenue passengers carried")(k)	Passenger load factor (%)	Fleet size	Number of aircraft orders	References
2019	1,893	−246	1,888	87.8	24	21	
2020	861	−1,723	572	71.0	28	17	
2021	20	−1,978	8	8.8	27	16	
2022	692	−1,359	314	68.3	26	16	
2023	5,603	433	4,146	86.0	33	12	
2024	6,325	−204	6,100	83.4	41	22	
2025	6,778	−996	7,912	79.6	44	18	

=== Headquarters ===
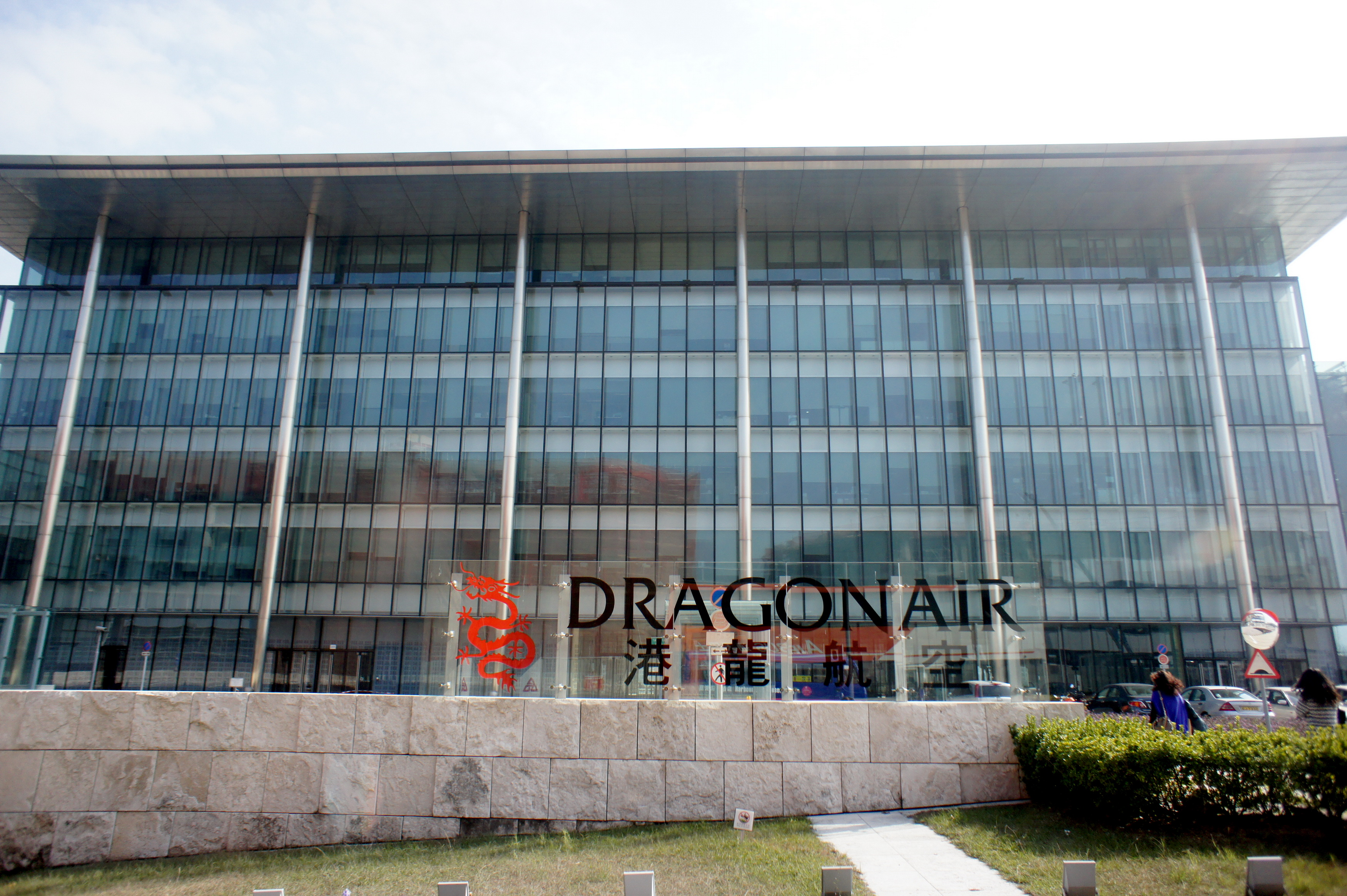
Cathay Dragon House, now the head office of HK Express

The current head office is in the Cathay House (formerly known as Dragonair House and Cathay Dragon House) at Hong Kong International Airport in Chek Lap Kok.

The head office of HK Express was previously located at One Citygate in Tung Chung, Lantau.

=== Senior leadership ===
- Chairman: Ronald Lam (since August 2019)
- Chief executive: Jeanette Mao (since April 2023)

==== List of former chairmen ====
1. Stanley Ho (2004–2007)
2. Ronnie Choi (2007–2008)
3. Yang Jianhong (2008–2013)
4. Jimmy Ma (2014–2017)
5. Zhong Guosong (2017–2019)
6. Rupert Hogg (2019)

==== List of former chief executives ====
1. Andrew Tse (2004–2007)
2. Kalid Razack (2007–2015)
3. Andrew Cowen (2015–2017)
4. Li Dianchun (2017–2018)
5. Luo Cheng (2018–2019)
6. Ronald Lam (2019)
7. Mandy Ng (2019–2023)

== Destinations ==
These destinations are currently served by HK Express.

Country	City	Airport	Notes	Refs
Cambodia	Siem Reap	Siem Reap International Airport	Terminated	
China	Beijing	Beijing Daxing International Airport		
China	Changzhou	Changzhou Benniu International Airport		
China	Dunhuang	Dunhuang Mogao International Airport	Terminated	
China	Guiyang	Guiyang Longdongbao International Airport		
China	Kunming	Kunming Changshui International Airport	Terminated	
China	Ningbo	Ningbo Lishe International Airport		
China	Sanya	Sanya Phoenix International Airport		
China	Yiwu	Yiwu Airport		
China	Zhangjiajie	Zhangjiajie Hehua International Airport	Terminated	
Guam	Hagåtña	Antonio B. Won Pat International Airport	Terminated	
Hong Kong	Hong Kong	Hong Kong International Airport	Hub	
Japan	Fukuoka	Fukuoka Airport		
Japan	Hiroshima	Hiroshima Airport		
Japan	Ishigaki	New Ishigaki Airport		
Japan	Kagoshima	Kagoshima Airport	Terminated	
Japan	Komatsu	Komatsu Airport		
Japan	Kumamoto	Kumamoto Airport	Terminated	
Japan	Nagasaki	Nagasaki Airport	Terminated	
Japan	Nagoya	Chubu Centrair International Airport		
Japan	Naha	Naha Airport		
Japan	Osaka	Kansai International Airport		
Japan	Sendai	Sendai Airport		
Japan	Shimojishima	Shimojishima Airport		
Japan	Shizuoka	Shizuoka Airport		
Japan	Takamatsu	Takamatsu Airport		
Japan	Tokyo	Haneda Airport		
Japan	Tokyo	Narita International Airport		
Malaysia	Kota Kinabalu	Kota Kinabalu International Airport		
Malaysia	Kuala Lumpur	Sultan Abdul Aziz Shah Airport		
Malaysia	Penang	Penang International Airport		
Northern Mariana Islands	Saipan	Saipan International Airport	Terminated	
Philippines	Clark	Clark International Airport		
Philippines	Manila	Ninoy Aquino International Airport		
Singapore	Singapore	Changi Airport	Terminated	
South Korea	Busan	Gimhae International Airport		
South Korea	Cheongju	Cheongju International Airport		
South Korea	Daegu	Daegu International Airport		
South Korea	Jeju	Jeju International Airport		
South Korea	Seoul	Incheon International Airport		
Taiwan	Hualien	Hualien Airport	Terminated	
Taiwan	Kaohsiung	Kaohsiung International Airport		
Taiwan	Taichung	Taichung International Airport		
Taiwan	Taipei	Taoyuan International Airport		
Thailand	Bangkok	Don Mueang International Airport	Terminated	
Thailand	Bangkok	Suvarnabhumi Airport		
Thailand	Chiang Mai	Chiang Mai International Airport		
Thailand	Chiang Rai	Chiang Rai International Airport	Terminated	
Thailand	Phuket	Phuket International Airport		
Vietnam	Da Nang	Da Nang International Airport		
Vietnam	Hanoi	Noi Bai International Airport		
Vietnam	Nha Trang	Cam Ranh International Airport		
Vietnam	Phu Quoc	Phu Quoc International Airport		

=== Codeshare agreements ===
HK Express has a codeshare agreement with Cathay Pacific.

== Fleet ==
=== Current fleet ===
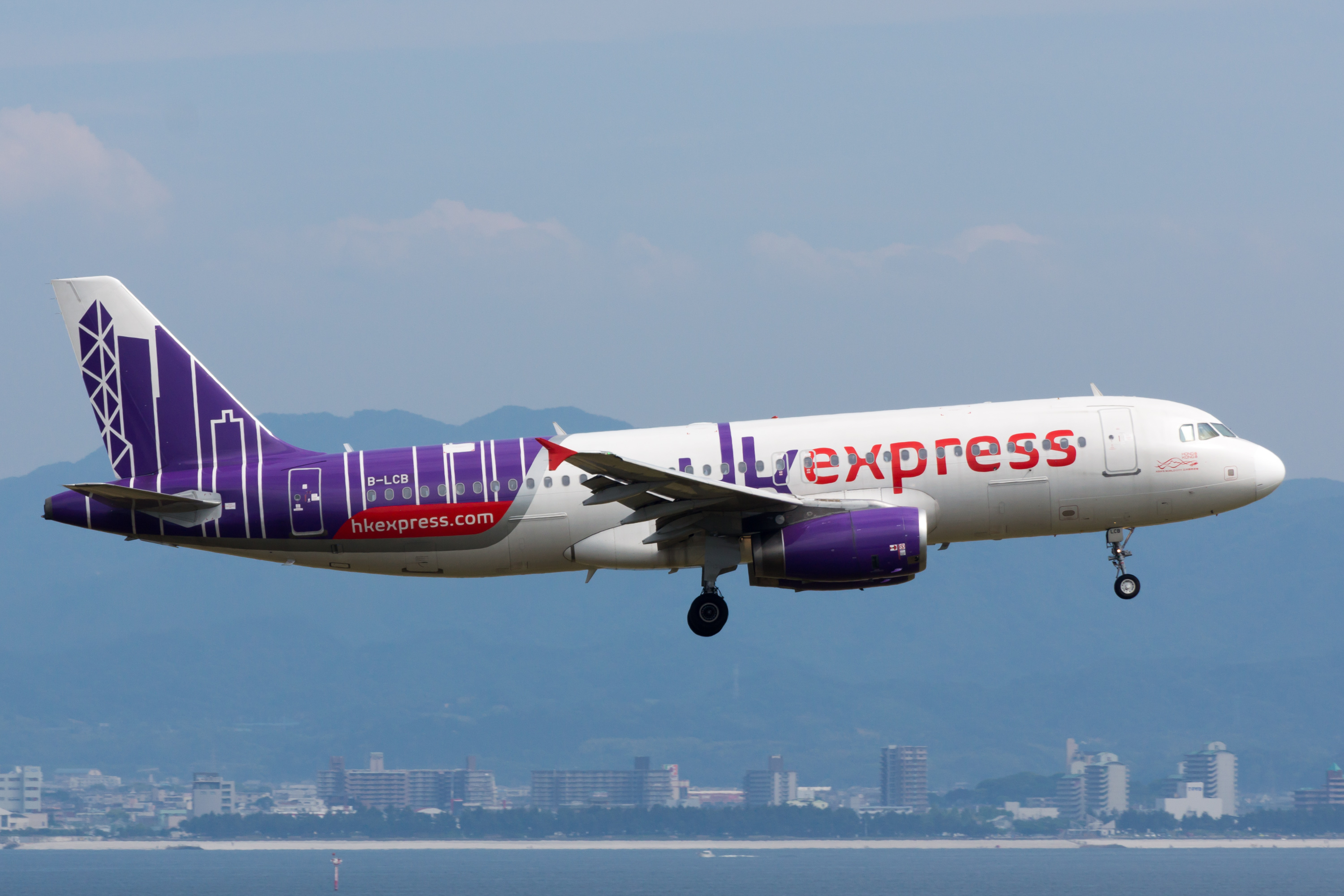
Airbus A320-200

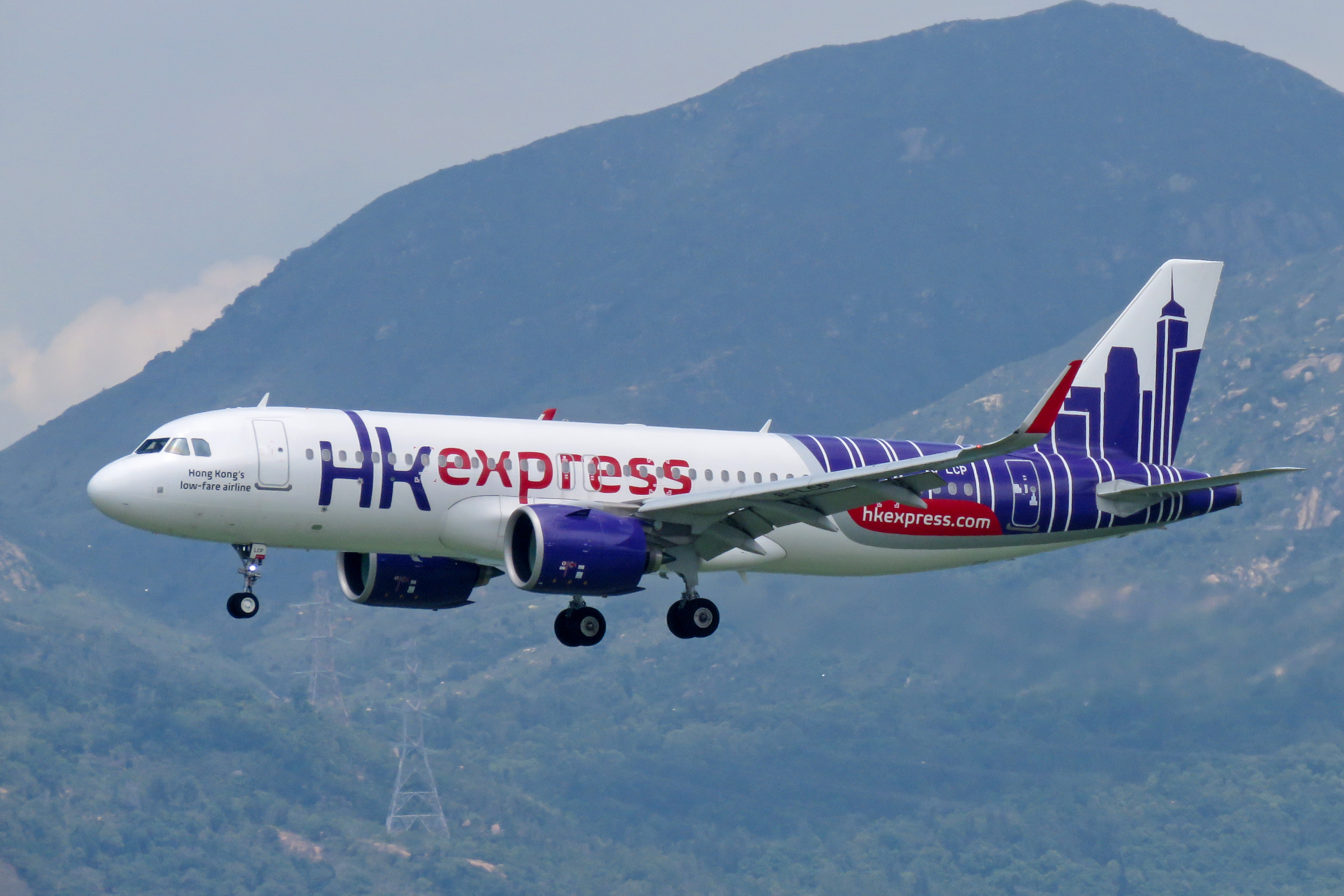
Airbus A320neo

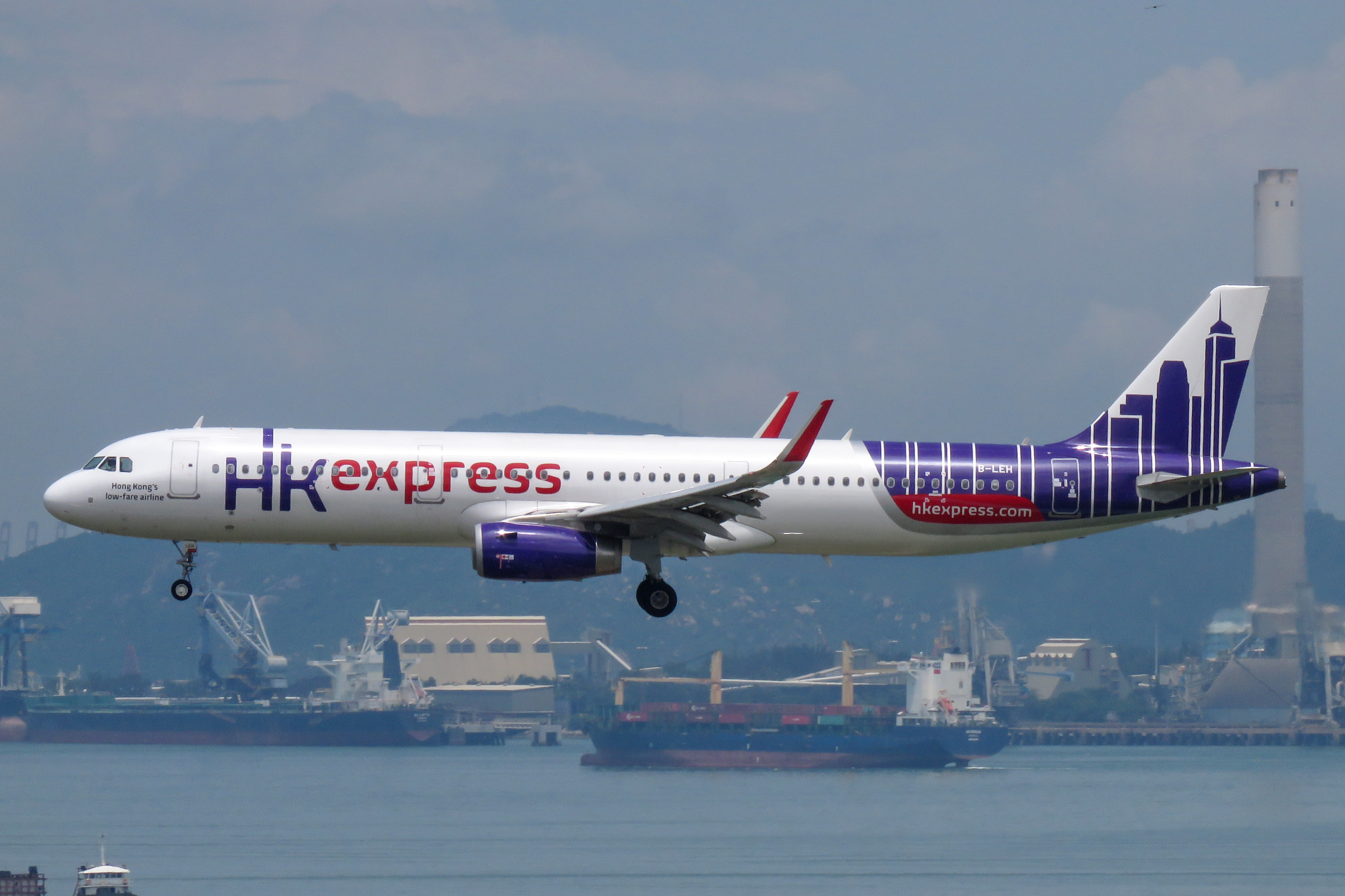
Airbus A321-200

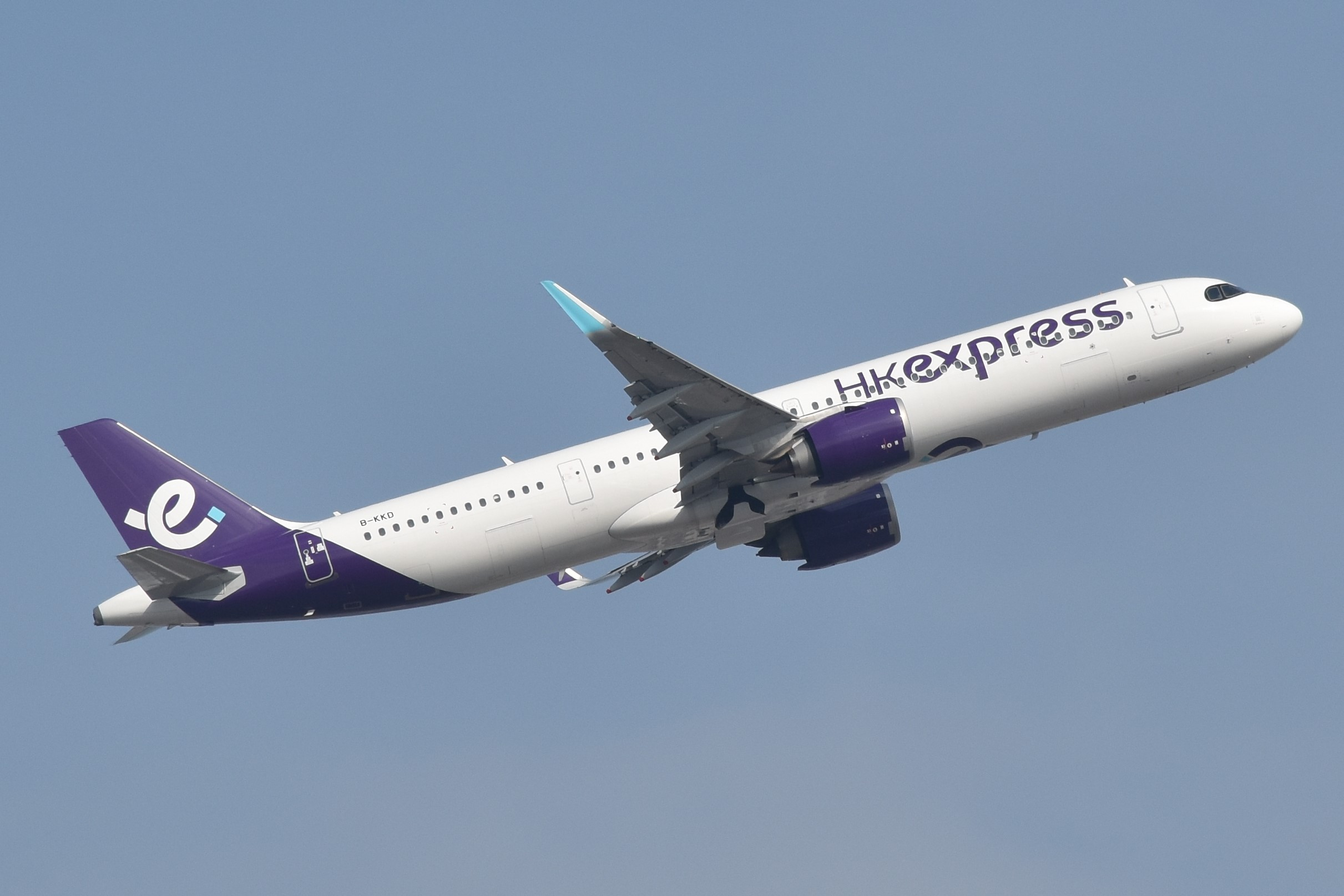
Airbus A321neo

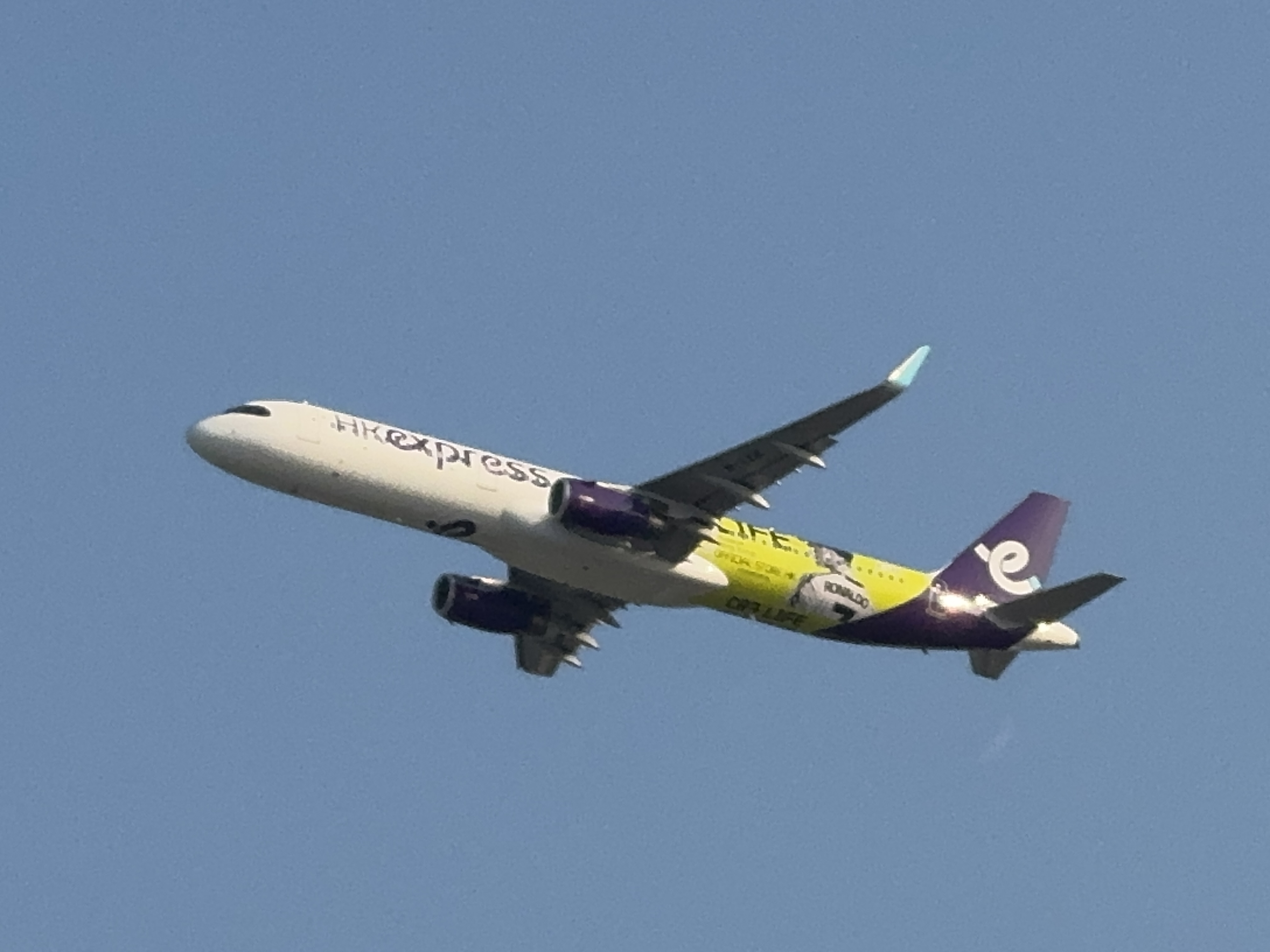
Hong Kong Express CR7 Life Museum Hong Kong livery

As of July 2026, HK Express operates the following aircraft:

HK Express fleet
Aircraft	In service	Orders	Passengers	Notes
Airbus A320-200	6	—	180	
Airbus A320neo	10	8	188	Deliveries through 2029.
Airbus A321-200	10	—	230	
Airbus A321neo	16	10	236	Deliveries through 2029.
Total	42	18		

=== Fleet development ===
In December 2015, HK Express signed a firm agreement with Norwegian unit Arctic Aviation Assets to lease 12 A320neos to be delivered between 2016 and 2018. A separate agreement for 10 A321-200s was also signed with another lessor. In December 2016, the first A320neo entered the fleet.

In November 2019, Cathay Pacific announced that Hong Kong Express will receive 16 Airbus A321neo aircraft with expected deliveries from 2022 onwards. The first A321neo was delivered in March 2023.

=== Former fleet ===
As of December 2025, HK Express operated 6 Airbus A320, 10 Airbus A320neo, 10 Airbus A321 and 16 Airbus A321neo

HK Express has previously operated the following aircraft:

Aircraft	Introduced	Retired
Boeing 737-800	2007	2013
Embraer E170	2005	2007

=== Livery ===
==== First livery ====
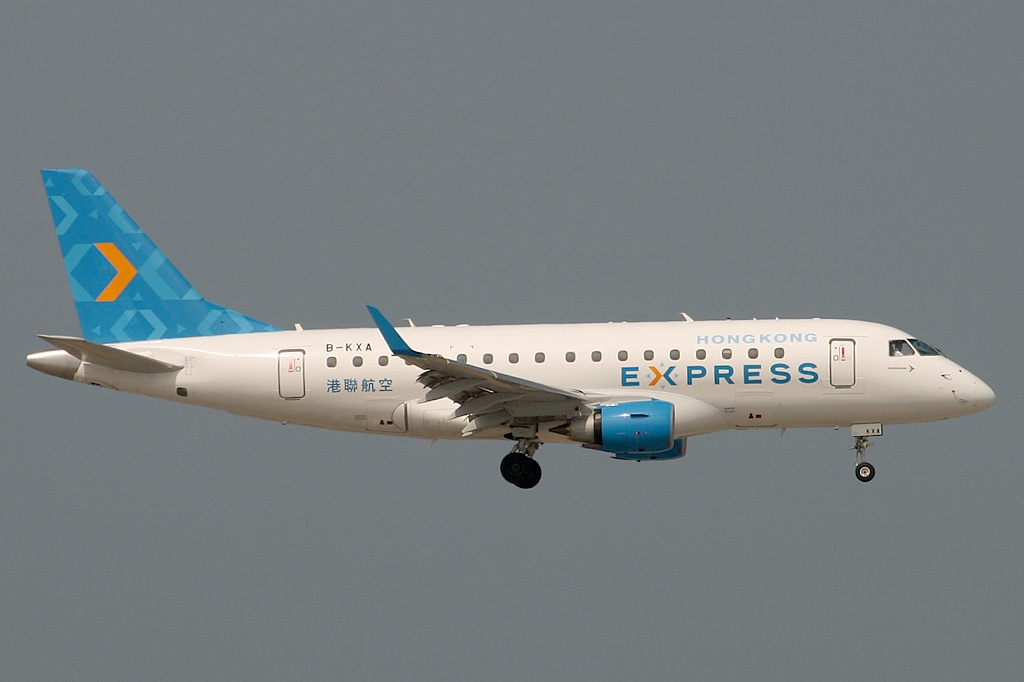
An Embraer E170 in the airline's original Hong Kong Express Airways livery

The first livery features a white fuselage with a blue engine and wingtip. The words "Hong Kong Express" are painted under the windows, with its former name "港聯航空" at the rear door.

==== Second livery ====
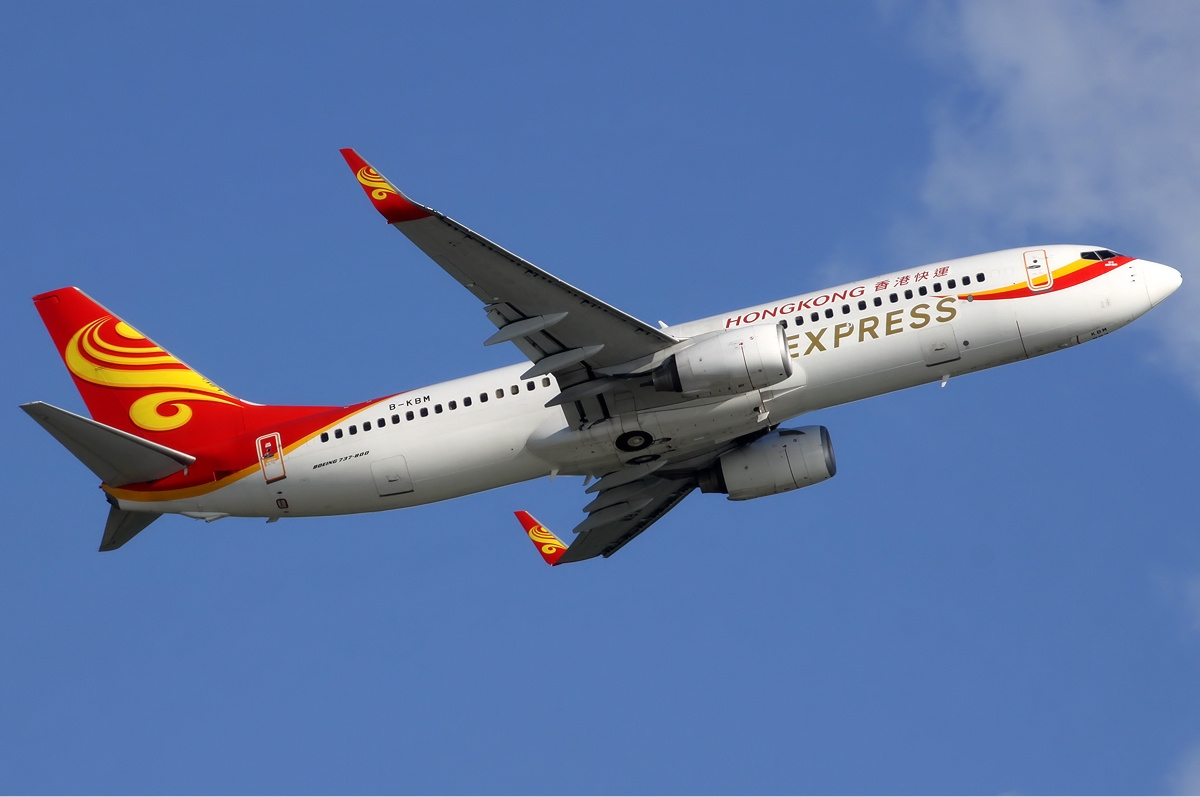
A Boeing 737-800 in the airline's second-generation Hong Kong Express Airways livery when it was part of the HNA group

The second livery features the standard HNA Group airline livery, almost identical with the livery of Hong Kong Airlines, with the golden bauhinia design on its logo. The only difference is the word "Express" in block letters is painted under the windows.

==== Third livery ====
The third livery of Hong Kong Express followed the logo redesign of the airline. It features a white fuselage with a purple and red theme, and has a Hong Kong city silhouette in purple on the tail.

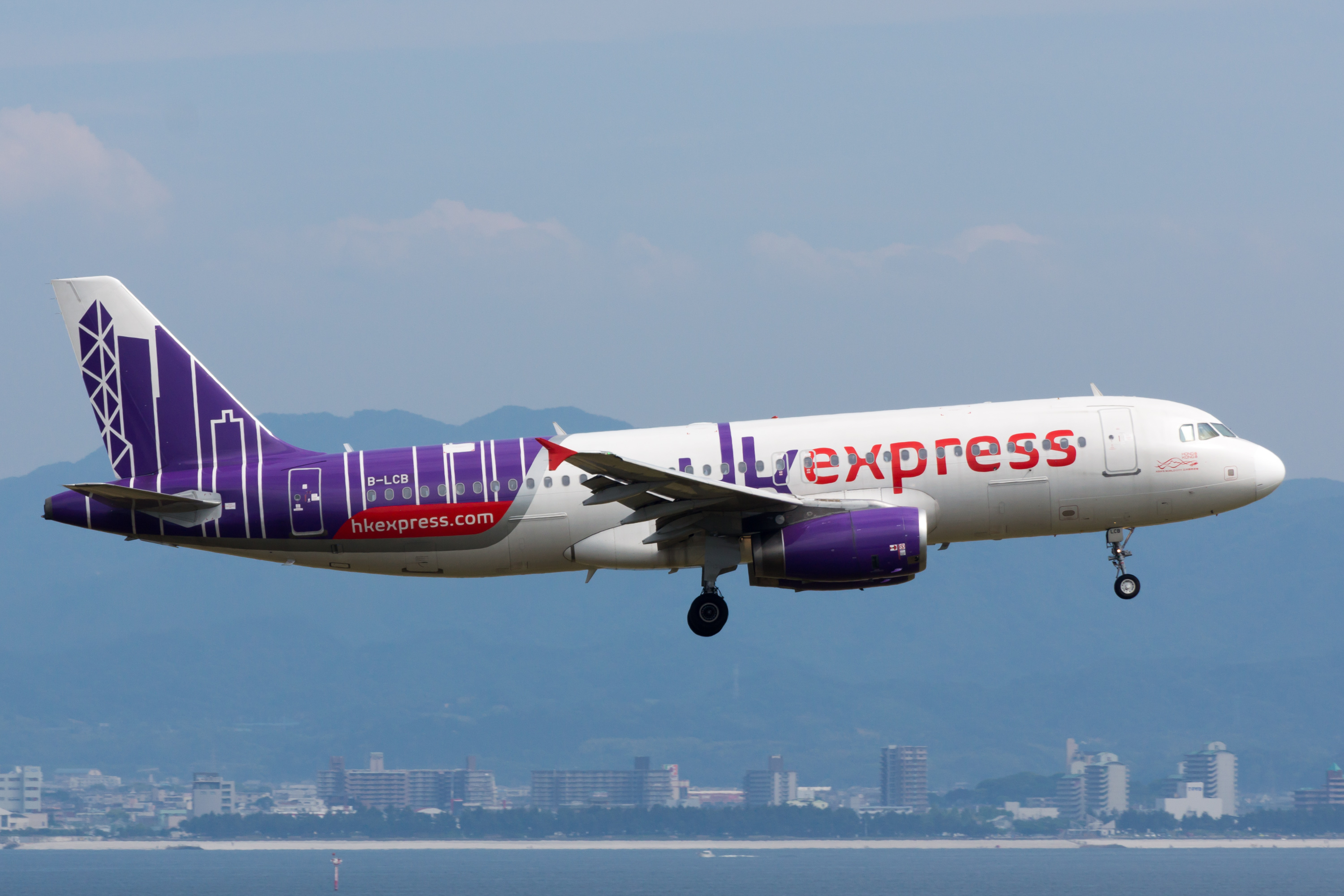
HK Express A320-200 in the third-generation livery

==== Current livery ====
In 2023, as part of a complete rebranding, a new livery was introduced. The image of the iconic HK skyline was removed and replaced by a stylized “e” on the tail. That same “e” logo will also be applied to the winglets, as well as the bottom of the aircraft. An Airbus A320-200 (B-LCH) was the last remaining aircraft that had the 2013 livery until it was repainted in October 2026.

== Loyalty programme ==
On 14 April 2016, Hong Kong Express launched a loyalty programme named "Reward-U". Flights and gifts can be redeemed on the official website. The programme is free to join, only individuals two years old or above can join the programme. Each eligible Hong Kong Dollar spend earns ten points, but U-Biz passengers can earn 20 points per dollar spent. At most, five members can form a reward-U crew to consolidate the points. Reward-U officially ceased its operations on 31 December 2019, merging with AsiaMiles.

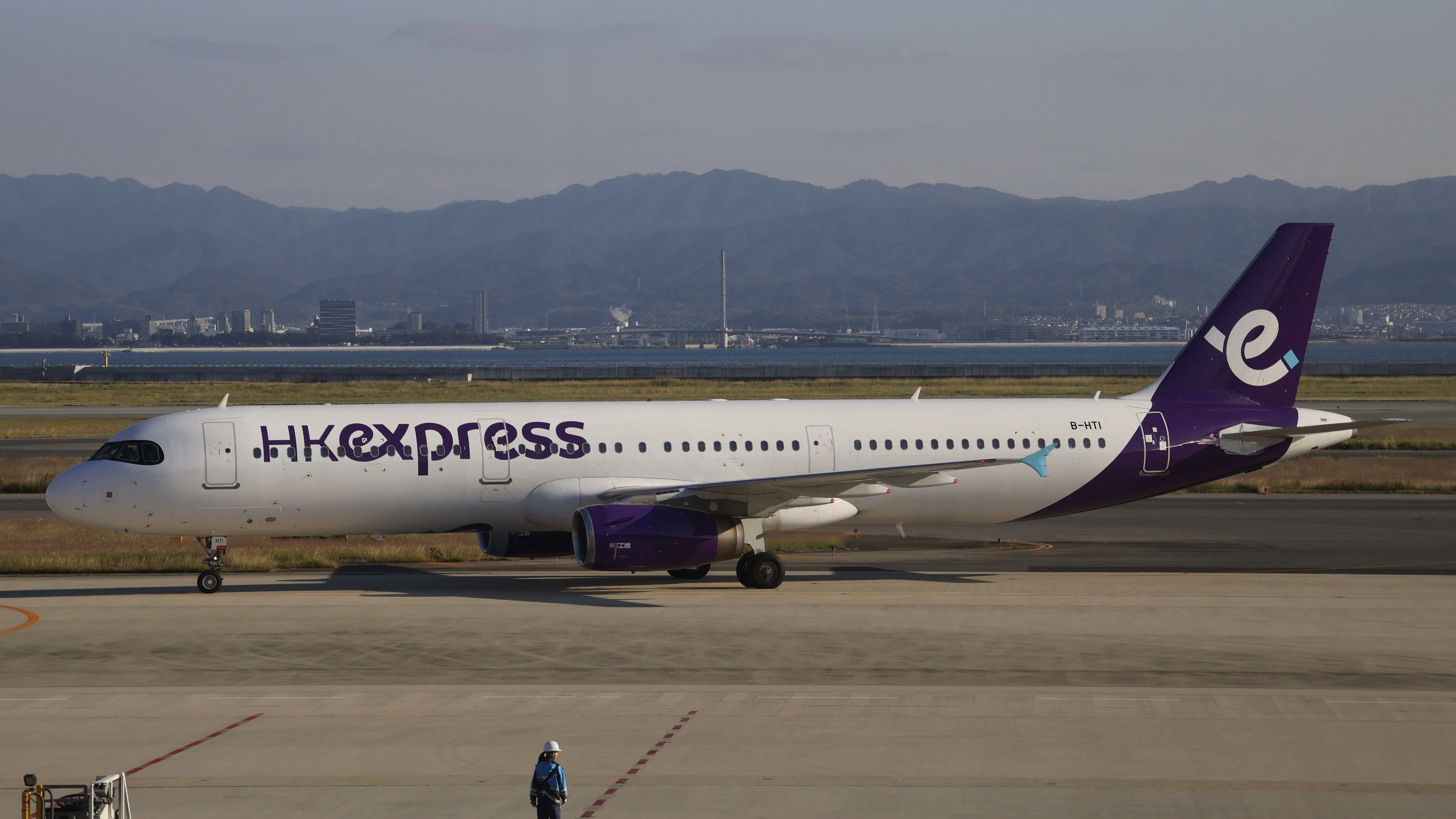
HK Express Airbus A321-200 in its current livery

== Controversies ==
=== Sudden flight cancellation ===
On 29 September 2017, HK Express suddenly cancelled 18 flights to Osaka, Nagoya and Incheon on 1 and 8 October without any notice. Because the flights cancelled covered the National Day of China and Mid-Autumn Festival holidays, 2,070 passengers were affected. HK Express felt extremely sorry for the inconvenience caused, and proposed a series of alternative solutions for the affected passengers, like travelling on another airline, changing travel dates, changing destination and a full refund. The Civil Aviation Department was unsatisfied by the behaviour of HK Express, and required the airline to submit a detailed report regarding the causes, short-term and long-term solutions to the incidents.

=== Inappropriate promotion methods ===
In July 2018, HK Express was found posting advertisements under street signposts, with QR codes available for citizens to scan to get information and participate in games to win prizes. The advertisements did not show the airline's name nor its logo; however, names of Japanese places were shown. District council members said that these materials might cause chaos and mislead citizens, due to the fact that Highways Department strictly prohibits organisations from posting anything on their signposts. HK Express apologised for organising this activity, stopped the activity on 18 July 2018, and removed the advertisements.

== Incidents ==
To date, HK Express has never had a fatality or a hull loss incident.

- On 12 August 2020, two non-operating Airbus A321s collided while being towed.
- On 3 January 2023, flight UO600 heading from Hong Kong to Fukuoka, Japan, descended from 35,000 to 8,000 feet (10,700 to 2,400 m) 40 minutes into the flight due to a change in cabin pressure, before turning back and landing safely at Hong Kong International Airport.
- On September 8, 2025, flight UO235 from Beijing Daxing International Airport skidded off the runway and collided with a signage board while landing on runway 07L at Hong Kong International Airport during severe weather conditions. There were no reported injuries.

== See also ==
- List of airlines of Hong Kong
- List of companies of Hong Kong
- Transport in Hong Kong
