= List of defunct airlines of Thailand =

This is a list of defunct airlines of Thailand.

Airline	Image	IATA	ICAO	Callsign	Commenced operations	Ceased operations	Notes
Air Andaman		2Y	ADW	AIR ANDAMAN	2000	2004	
Air Phoenix			APN	THAI AIR PHOENIX	2008	2009	
Air Siam		VG			1965	1977	
Angel Air		8G	NGE	ANGEL AIR	1998	2003	
Asia Atlantic Airlines		HB	AAQ	ASIA ATLANTIC	2013	2018	Rebranded as Air Thailand
Asia Pacific Airlines					2013	2013	Rebranded as Asia Atlantic Airlines
Asian Air		DM	DEX	ASIAN AIR	2013	2016	
Bira Air Transport					1969	1974	
Business Air		8B	BCC	THAI BIZ	2009	2015	Rebranded as Intira Airlines
Chaba Air					2012	2012	failed start up which would operated the Airbus A340
City Airways		E8	GTA	CITY AIRWAYS	2011	2016	
Crystal Thai Airlines		YL	KPS	CRYSTAL THAI	2010	2012	Rebranded as U Airlines
Flyhy Cargo Airlines		W3	FYH		2004	2005	
Happy Air			HPY	HAPPY TRAVEL	2009	2015	
Intira Airlines		8B	BCC	THAI BIZ	2015	2015	Not launched
Jetgo International			JIC		2004	2007	
Jet Asia Airways		JF	JAA	JET ASIA	2011	2020	
Kan Air		K8	KND	KANNITHI AIR	2010	2017	
Legacy Air		L4	LGC	LEGACY AIR	2009		
New Gen Airways		E3	VGO	VIRGO	2012	2019	
NokScoot		NCT	XW	BIG BIRD	2013	2020	Shut down due to the COVID-19 pandemic
One-Two-GO Airlines		OG;E2	OTG	THAI EXPRESS	2005	2010	Integrated into Orient Thai Airlines
Orient Express Air		OX	OEA	ORIENT EXPRESS	1995	1997	Merged into Orient Thai Airlines
Orient Thai Airlines		OX	OEA	ORIENT THAI	1995	2018	Went bankrupt
Pacific Overseas Airlines					1947	1951	Merged with Siamese Airways to form Thai Airways Company
PBair		9Q	PBA	PEEBEE AIR	1997	2009	
P.C. Air		GT	PCA	PIYO AIR	2010	2012	
Phetchabun Airlines					2005	2005	
Princess Airlines					1996	1996	
R Airlines		RK	RCT	GREEN SKY	2012	2018	
SGA Airlines		5E	SGN	SIAM	2002	2014	
Siam Air		O8	SQM	GOLDEN FIN	2014	2017	
Siamjet Airlines			SCJ	SIAM JET	2012	2012	Not launched
Siamese Airways					1947	1951	Merged with Pacific Overseas Airlines to form Thai Airways Company
Sky Eyes Airways		I6	SEQ		1995	2008	
SkyStar Airways		XT	SKT	SKY YOU	2005	2009	
Solar Air			SRB	SOLAR THAI	2004	2010	
Sunny Airways		2S	SUW	SUNNY	2011	2012	
Thai Air Cargo		T2	TCG	THAI CARGO	2005	2006	
Thai Airways Company		TH	THA	THAI AIR	1951	1988	Merged into Thai Airways International
Thai Global Air		YH	THG		2006	2008	
Thai Pacific Airlines		3P	TPV	THAI PACIFIC	2003	2004	
Thai Regional Airlines		RW	TRB	THAI REGIONAL	2012	2013	
Thai Sky Airlines		9I	LLR	THAI SKY AIR	2004	2007	
Thai Smile		THD	WE	THAI SMILE	2012	2023	Integrated into Thai Airways International
Thai Tiger Airways					2010	2011	Failed venture
Thai Summer Airways		9T	AST	THAI SUMMER	2018	2023	Not launched
ThaiJet			THJ	THAI JET	2003	2004	
Trans Asiatic Airlines					1947	1950	
U Airlines		YL	ULG	UNICORN	2012	2014	
Wisdom Airways			GBJ		2017	2019	

== See also ==
- List of airlines of Thailand
- List of airports in Thailand

== Bibliography ==
- Lumholdt N.-Warren W., The history of aviation in Thailand, Travel Publishing Asia Ltd., Hong Kong, 1987
- Young E.M., Aerial nationalism-History of aviation in Thailand, Smithsonian Institution Press, Washington (D.C.), 1995
- Darke S.M.-Vannukul V., Royal orchid-The history of civil aviation in Thailand, Air Britain Historians, U.K.
