= Thai Summer Airways =

Low-cost airline of Thailand

IATA	ICAO	Call sign
9T	AST	THAI SUMMER
- Founded: 2018; 8 years ago
- Commenced operations: 18 April 2023; 3 years ago
- Hubs: U-Tapao International Airport
- Fleet size: 6
- Destinations: 14
- Headquarters: Bangkok, Thailand
- Website: www.summerairways.com (defunct)

Thai Summer Airways Company Limited was a planned low-cost airline based in Thailand, and it is a collaboration between investors from Thailand, Taiwan and China. In September 2020, the airline was granted its air operator's certificate, and it acquired its first aircraft in February 2022. However, the airline has faced several launch delays due to the COVID-19 pandemic.

== History ==
Summer Airways was established in early 2018.

== Destinations ==
As of April 2023, Thai Summer Airways operates or has operated to the following destinations:

Country / region	City	Airport	Notes	Refs
Macau	Macau	Macau International Airport		
Taiwan	Taipei	Taoyuan International Airport		
Thailand	Bangkok	Don Mueang International Airport	Hub	
Thailand	Chiang Mai	Chiang Mai International Airport		
Thailand	Chiang Rai	Chiang Rai International Airport		
Thailand	Hat Yai	Hat Yai International Airport		
Thailand	Hua Hin	Hua Hin Airport		
Thailand	Khon Kaen	Khon Kaen Airport		
Thailand	Mae Sot	Mae Sot Airport		
Thailand	Nakhon Si Thammarat	Nakhon Si Thammarat Airport		
Thailand	Nan	Nan Nakhon Airport		
Thailand	Phitsanulok	Phitsanulok Airport		
Thailand	Phuket	Phuket International Airport		
Thailand	Rayong	U-Tapao International Airport	Hub	
Thailand	Roi Et	Roi Et Airport		
Thailand	Surat Thani	Surat Thani International Airport		
Thailand	Udon Thani	Udon Thani International Airport		

== Fleet ==
As of October 2021, Thai Summer Airways had operated the following aircraft:

Thai Summer Airways fleet
Aircraft	In service	Orders	Passengers	Notes
Boeing 737-800	6	2		
Total	6	2		
