= JF =

JF may refer to:

Brands:

- JF Duck, an aircraft
- Mazda JF engine, a piston engine
- JetFlash, a line of flash drives made by Transcend

Businesses and organizations:

- Japan Foundation
- Jardine Fleming, Hong Kong-based investment bank
- Javnaðarflokkurin, the Social Democratic Party of the Faroe Islands
- TUI fly Belgium, a Belgian airline formerly known as Jetairfly
- Jet Asia Airways, a Thai airline (IATA code JF)
- L.A.B. Flying Service, an American airline (1956-2008, IATA code JF)

Cities

- Juiz de Fora, a municipality of Minas Gerais, Brazil which goes by this nickname
