= Nakhon Si Thammarat Airport =

Airport in southern Thailand

Nakhon Si Thammarat International Airport ท่าอากาศยานนานาชาตินครศรีธรรมราช
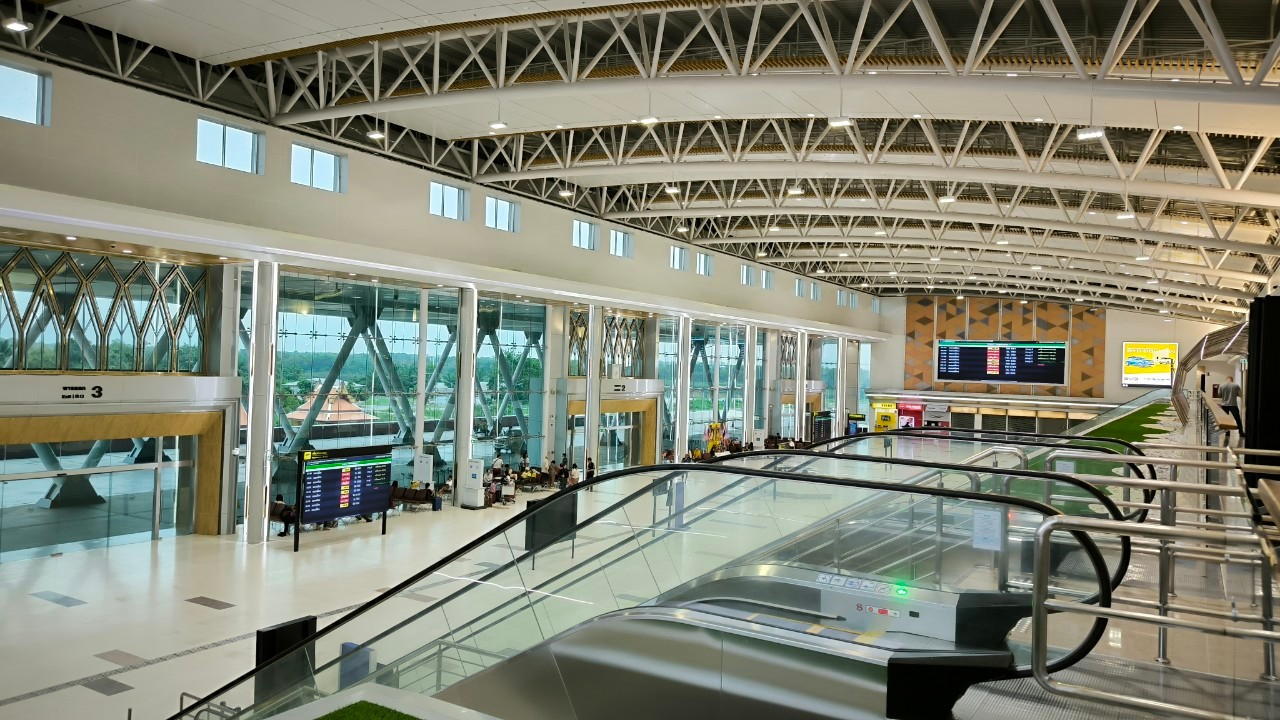
- IATA: NST; ICAO: VTSF

Summary
- Airport type: Public
- Operator: Department of Airports
- Serves: Nakhon Si Thammarat
- Location: Pak Phun, Mueang Nakhon Si Thammarat, Nakhon Si Thammarat, Thailand
- Opened: 1 December 1998; 27 years ago
- Elevation AMSL: 13 ft (4.0 m)
- Coordinates: 8°32′24″N 99°56′25.3″E

Maps
- Location of airport in Thailand
- Interactive map of Nakhon Si Thammarat International Airport

Runways
Direction	Length		Surface
Direction	m	ft	Surface
01/19	2,100	6,890	Asphalt

Statistics (2024)
- Passengers: 1,040,791 ▼12.93%
- Aircraft movements: 8,037 ▼11.81%
- Freight (tonnes): 414.12 ▲7.86%
- Source: DAFIF

Nakhon Si Thammarat International Airport (IATA: NST, ICAO: VTSF) is in Pak Phun subdistrict, Mueang Nakhon Si Thammarat district, Nakhon Si Thammarat province in southern Thailand.

== History ==
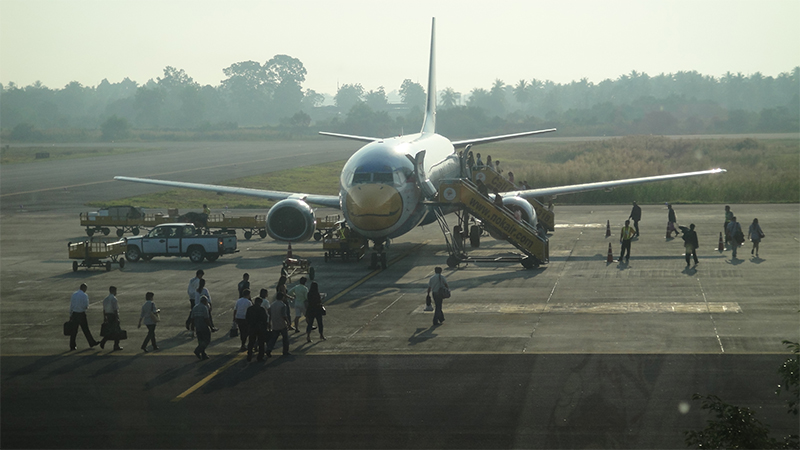
Passengers boarding Nok Air flight at Nakhon Si Thammarat Airport

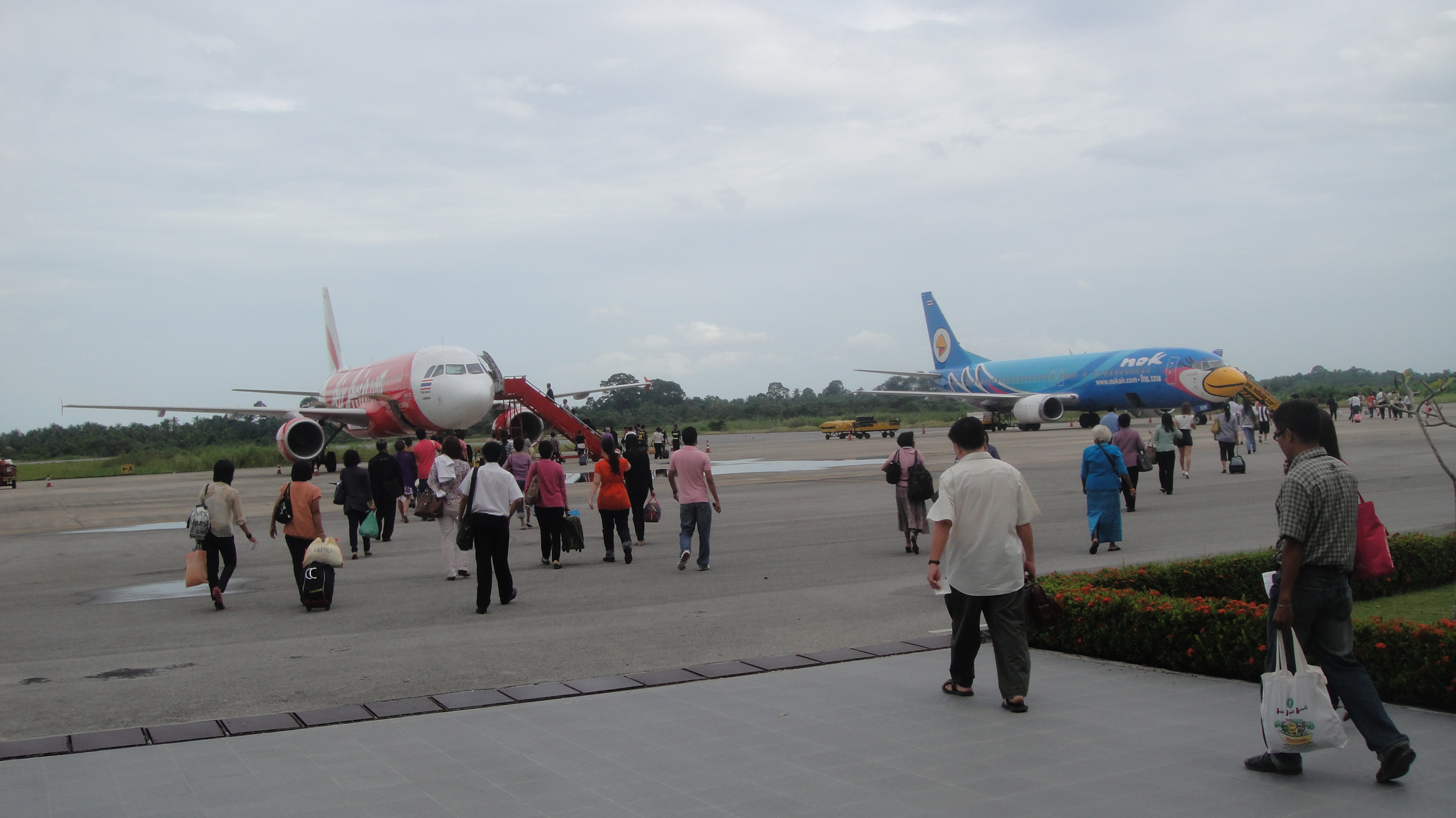
Nok Air and Thai AirAsia parking at Nakhon Si Thammarat Airport and preparing departure

The airport's first landing was on 1 December 1998 by Thai Airways International and PBair from Bangkok.

Beginning in 1985, Nakhon Si Thammarat used Cha-ian Airport (Army Region 4) temporarily. Thai Airways Company flew from Surat Thani to Nakhon Si Thammarat on Short 360 aircraft. Nakhon Si Thammarat Airport then had Nok Air, Thai AirAsia, and One-Two-Go as airlines. Thai Airways and PBair later suspended service.

In July 2008, the Department of Civil Aviation (Thailand) suspended the certificate of One-Two-Go (operated by Orient Thai Airlines) from 22 July to 15 September. One-Two-Go was then re-certified and their service was suspended to Nakhon Si Thammarat Airport.

As a result of the airport's growth, the Nakhon Si Thammarat Provincial Governor and Nakhon Si Thammarat Airport Director are working on including international flights, due to the potential for increased tourism and economic growth for the Nakhon Si Thammarat province. The initiative planned to extend the runway to 2,600 meters (8,500 feet).

On 12 July 2013 Nakhon Si Thammarat Airport was published in Royal Thai Government Gazette to customs airport, No. 10/1 of Ministerial Regulation prescribed port or place, customs airport, border approval way, and customs ACT 2553. Dated 1 July 2013 by Kittiratt Na-Ranong, the Minister of Finance, which resulted in Nakhon Si Thammarat Airport qualifying to import and export international flights and goods.

== Capacity ==
The airport is 14 km (8.7 mi) from the city center. It has an arrival terminal capacity of 188 people per hour and a departure terminal capacity of 215 people per hour. It has two Boeing 737 parking spaces, two ATR 72 parking spaces, and two helipad spaces. The airport spans 2,902,400 square meters (1.1206 square miles).

The terminal building covers 7,985 square meters (85,950 square feet). The arrival terminal covers 375 square meters (4,040 square feet), while the departure terminal covers 375 square meters (4,040 square feet).

The flight capacity is 32/day. The passenger capacity is 2,504 passengers/day. Aircraft parking space is 17,000 square meters (85 x 200 meters). The runway covers 45 by 2,100 meters (148 by 6,890 feet).

== Airlines and destinations ==
=== Passenger ===
Airlines	Destinations
Nok Air	Bangkok–Don Mueang
Thai AirAsia	Bangkok–Don Mueang, Bangkok–Suvarnabhumi
Thai Lion Air	Bangkok–Don Mueang
Thai VietJet Air	Bangkok–Suvarnabhumi

== Statistics ==
Activity
year	Flights (flights/year)	Passengers (people/year)	Cargo (kilograms/year)	Mail (kilograms/year)	Passenger change (%)
1995	796	30,079	93,656	0	0.0
1996	898	39,805	75,228	0	▲32.33
1997	1,070	62,755	134,265	0	▲57.66
1998	1,240	69,979	140,177	0	▲11.22
1999	726	74,712	271,891	0	▲6.76
2000	788	82,687	373,336	115	▲10.67
2001	1,352	92,583	425,723	0	▲11.97
2002	1,262	90,921	546,462	0	▼1.80
2003	1,705	104,340	820,998	0	▲14.76
2004	2,048	131,957	1,105,237	0	▲26.47
2005	2,160	146,435	1,369,876	0	▲10.97
2006	2,275	193,231	983,837	0	▲31.96
2007	3,488	396,737	1,587,848	0	▲105.32
2008	2,636	299,075	1,205,442	0	▼24.62
2009	2,458	297,257	1,108,671	0	▼0.61
2010	3,365	406,792	811,327	0	▲36.85
2011	4,610	555,015	684,214	0	▲36.44
