= Siam Air =

Airline of Thailand (2010–2017)

IATA	ICAO	Call sign
O8	SQM	GOLDEN FIN
- Founded: 4 June 2010
- Commenced operations: October 2014
- Ceased operations: 2017
- Hubs: Don Mueang International Airport
- Alliance: Orient Thai Airlines
- Fleet size: 4
- Destinations: 7
- Headquarters: Don Mueang district, Bangkok, Thailand
- Key people: Flt Lt Surin Sukkang (CEO)
- Website: www.siamair.co.th

Siam Air Transport Co., Ltd., or Siam Air, was a Thai airline with its head office on the property of Don Mueang International Airport in Don Mueang District, Bangkok. It operated services out of Don Mueang International Airport.

== History ==
The airline began operations in October 2014 with services out of Don Mueang to Hong Kong, using two Boeing 737-300s. Two Boeing 737-800s were added to its fleet in late 2015. It expanded by adding Zhengzhou and Guangzhou to its network in early 2015. In late 2015, the airline launched flights to Macau and Singapore. In 2019, the airline ceased all operations.

== Destinations ==
China

- Changsha – Changsha Huanghua International Airport
- Guangzhou – Guangzhou Baiyun International Airport
- Zhengzhou – Zhengzhou Xinzheng International Airport

Hong Kong

- Hong Kong International Airport

Macau

- Macau International Airport

Singapore

- Changi Airport

Thailand

- Bangkok – Don Mueang International Airport (Hub)

== Fleet ==
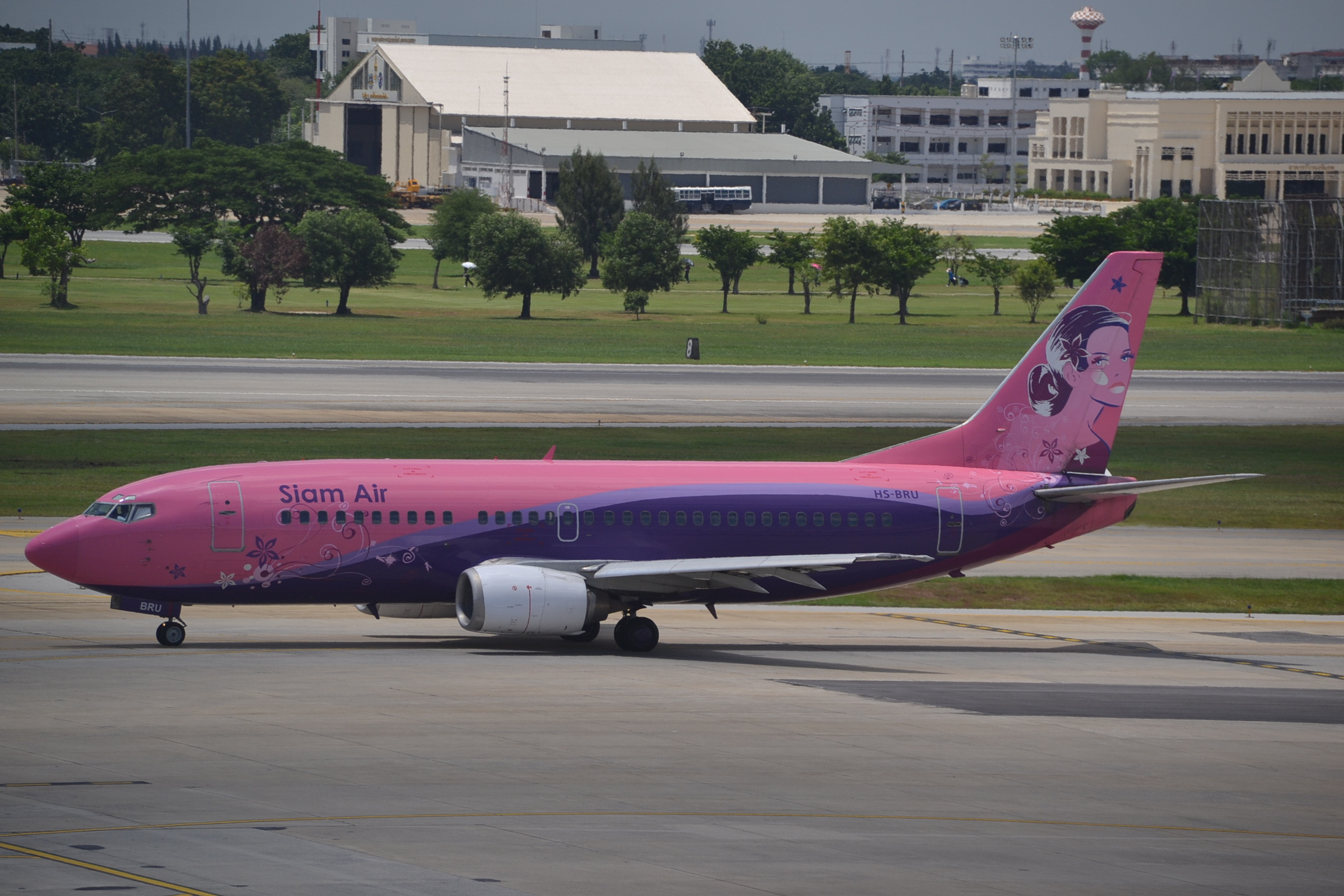
Siam Air's Boeing 737-300 at Bangkok Don Mueang Airport

During its seven-year existence, Siam Air operated the following aircraft:

Siam Air fleet
Aircraft	In service	Orders	Passengers (Economy)	Notes
Boeing 737-300	2	—	145	
Total	2	0		
