= One-Two-Go Airlines =

Domestic airline of Thailand (2003–2010)

One-Two-Go Airlines วัน ทู โก แอร์ไลน์
IATA	ICAO	Call sign
OG	OTG	THAI EXPRESS
- Founded: 2003
- Commenced operations: 3 December 2003
- Ceased operations: July 2010 (merged into Orient Thai Airlines)
- Operating bases: Don Mueang International Airport
- Parent company: Orient Thai Airlines
- Headquarters: Don Mueang district, Bangkok, Thailand
- Key people: Udom Tantiprasongchai (Chairman); Nina Tantiprasongchai

One-Two-Go Airlines Co. Ltd (Thai: วัน-ทู-โก แอร์ไลน์) was a low-cost airline based in Don Mueang district, Bangkok, Thailand. Its main base was Don Mueang International Airport, Bangkok. It was owned and managed by Orient Thai Airlines and CEO Udom Tantiprasongchai and his wife Nina Tantiprasongchai. The One-Two-Go brand was retired in July 2010, after the fatal crash of flight OG 269 in September 2007 was blamed substantially on misconduct by the airline, with the aircraft re-branded under Orient Thai Airlines. On 9 October 2018, Orient Thai Airlines ceased all operations.

== History ==
The airline started operations on 3 December 2003.

Following the crash of Flight 269 in Phuket, Thailand on 16 September 2007, One-Two-Go was banned from flying in European Union nations due to safety concerns.

On 8 April 2009, the European Commission added One-Two-Go Airlines to its blacklist of airline operators banned from entering European airspace.

Corruption within One-Two-Go Airlines and the Thai Department of Civil Aviation was a factor for the crash investigators of Flight 269.

Australia's Channel 9 broadcast a program in November 2007 which detailed accusations of maintenance fraud and specifically by CEO Udom Tantiprasongchai, coercion and bribery of pilots to fly excessive hours. The program contained an interview with lead Thai investigator Director-General Vuttichai Singhamany as he reviewed the daily flight rosters for One-Two-Go given to him by reporter Ferguson, documenting the Captain and First Officer's schedules showing that both pilots had flown beyond the legal limit for the week and for the month of the crash. Director-General Vuttichai said he would demand an explanation for the fraud from One-Two-Go.

In late February 2008, the victim's families, concerned about the impartiality and transparency of the crash investigation, created a website and on-line petition called InvestigateUdom.com calling for a proper investigation into the root causes of the crash.

The lead Thai Department of Civil Aviation investigator reported that documents he had received from One-Two-Go were fiction. The National Transportation Safety Board (which were also investigating the accident) report included the true work rosters, obtained by the family of a victim. The United States National Transportation Safety Board (NTSB) report documented possible check ride fraud among four other One-Two-Go pilots in the months following the crash.

Three years after the crash, the British government began its inquest process into the deaths of the eight British citizens killed. The inquest, held 22–23 March 2011, was presided over by H.M. Coroner, S.P.G. Fisher. Coroner Fisher relied on a British aviation investigator, the NTSB, and Thai reports, and victim and family statements to make his conclusions. He cited the "flagrant disregard for passenger safety" by the airline and said, "the primary failure so far as I am concerned relates to the corporate culture which prevailed both One-Two-Go Airlines and Orient Thai Airlines prior to and following the air crash." Fisher twice contacted the airline to send a representative to the hearing. The airline replied that they would not take part in the proceedings.

== Former destinations ==
During its seven-year existence, One-Two-Go Airlines served the following domestic destinations, all from its base at Don Mueang International Airport in Bangkok:

- Chiang Mai (Chiang Mai International Airport)
- Chiang Rai (Chiang Rai International Airport)
- Phuket (Phuket International Airport)
- Surat Thani (Surat Thani International Airport)
- Nakhon Si Thammarat (Nakhon Si Thammarat Airport)
- Trang (Trang Airport)
- Khon Kaen (Khon Kaen Airport)
- Krabi (Krabi International Airport)
- Ubon Ratchathani (Ubon Ratchathani Airport)
- Phitsanulok (Phitsanulok Airport)
- Narathiwat (Narathiwat Airport)
- Udon Thani (Udon Thani International Airport)
- Hat Yai (Hat Yai International Airport)

== Former fleet ==
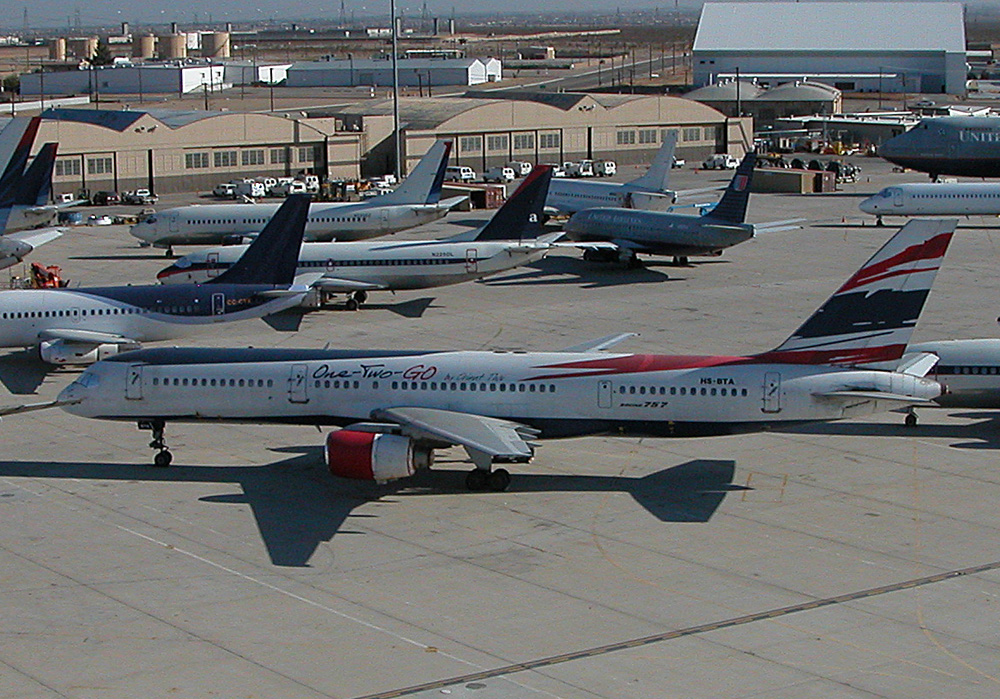
A One-Two-Go Boeing 757 in storage at the Victorville Airport.(Registration Number: HS-BTA)

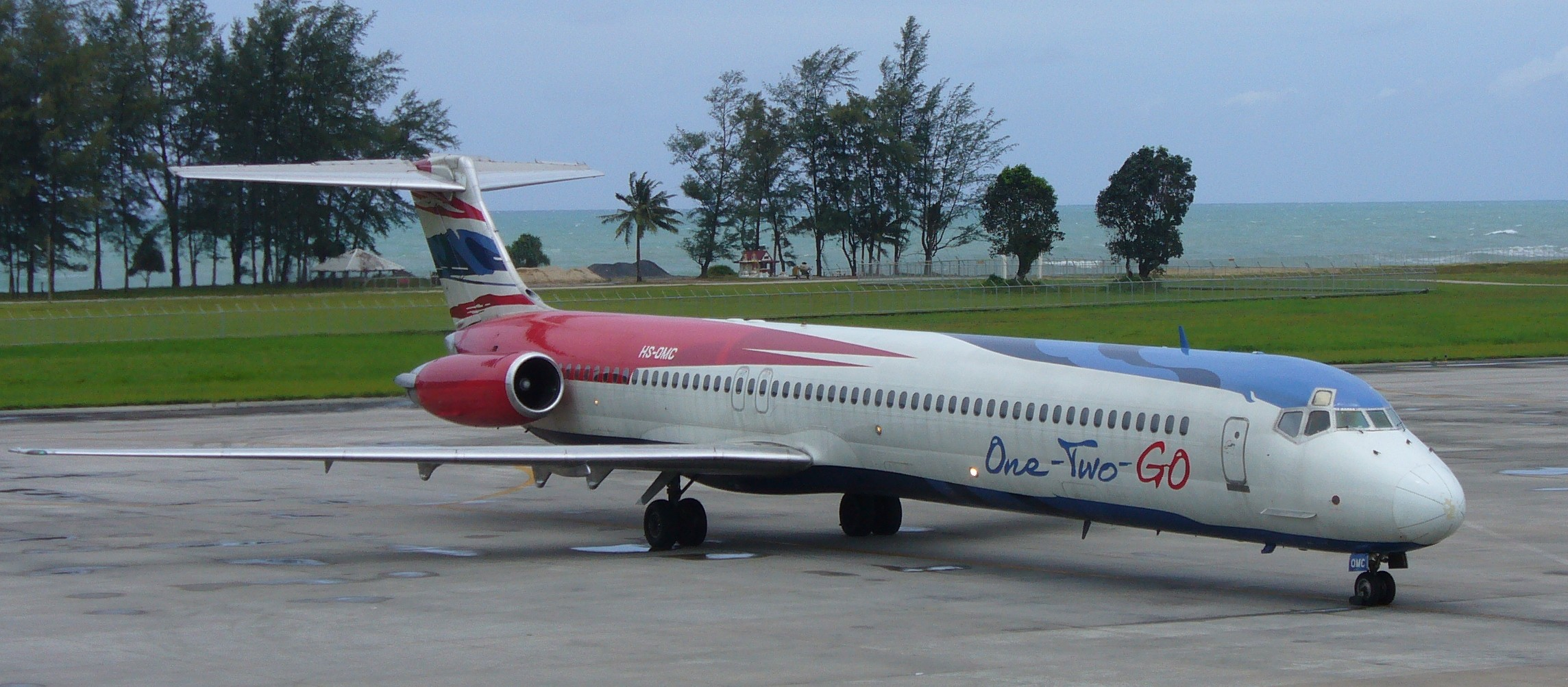
A One-Two-Go MD-82.(Registration Number: HS-OMC)

One-Two-Go Airlines had operated the following aircraft:

- 6 McDonnell Douglas MD-82 (Operated by Orient Thai Airlines)
- 1 McDonnell Douglas MD-83
- 2 McDonnell Douglas MD-87
- 4 Boeing 757-200 (operated by Orient Thai Airlines)
- 2 Boeing 747-100 (operated by Orient Thai Airlines)
- 2 Boeing 747-300 (operated by Orient Thai Airlines)

The airline was in negotiations to purchase several used MD-80s aircraft for expansion. This never happened.

== Incidents and accidents ==
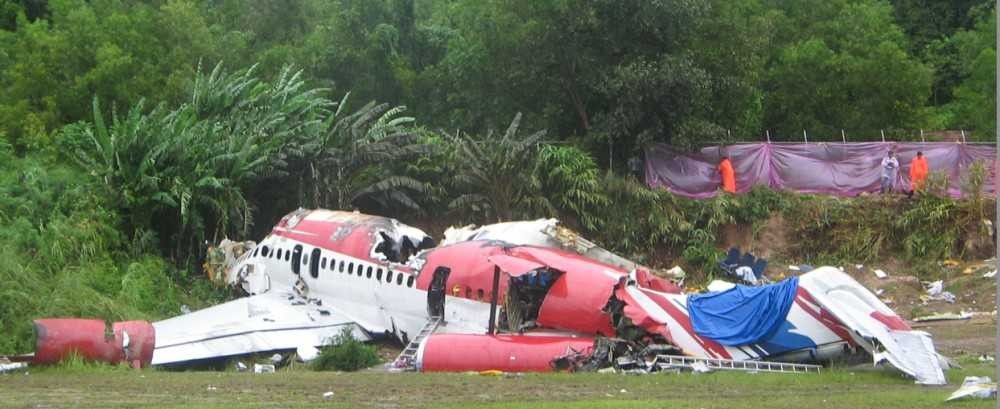
The wreckage of McDonnell Douglas DC-9-82 (MD-82) HS-OMG.

On 16 September 2007, One-Two-Go Airlines Flight 269, a McDonnell Douglas MD-82 (registered as HS-OMG) flying from Bangkok with 123 passengers and seven crew members, crashed in strong winds and heavy rain after attempting to land at Phuket International Airport. The aircraft was mostly destroyed in the blazing inferno that soon developed after the crash as the fuselage tore in two. 90 people were killed, including 5 of the crew members. 45 of the dead were tourists. In addition to the 90 dead, 26 people were "seriously injured" and 14 "suffered minor injuries". Thai aviation officials initially claimed that weather was a probable factor. The cause of the crash was later determined to be multiple flight crew errors caused by systemic failures including corruption and lack of training at One-Two-Go and within Thailand's Civil Aviation Authority, Department of Civil Aviation. "An Australian television show" says that One-Two-Go violated safety rules, such as by having pilots fly without getting enough rest, and submitted fake documentation to hide it.
