= Jet Asia Airways =

Charter airline of Thailand (2009–2020)

Jet Asia Airways เจ็ทเอเซีย แอร์เวย์
IATA	ICAO	Call sign
JF	JAA	Jet Asia
- Founded: 2009
- Ceased operations: 2020
- Destinations: 3
- Website: flyjetasia.com

Jet Asia Airways (Thai: เจ็ทเอเซีย แอร์เวย์) was a charter airline based out of Suvarnabhumi Airport in Bangkok, Thailand. Jet Asia Airways offered full-service scheduled and chartered services as well as long- and short-term ACMI flights (also known as wet leases).

== History ==
Jet Asia Airways was founded in December 2009 with two Boeing 767-200 aircraft, and received its air operator's certificate (AOC) in October 2010. It joined the Pacific Asia Travel Association on September 1, 2011. Its first commercial flight was on September 17, 2011, between Bangkok's Don Muang International Airport and Penang International Airport in Malaysia.

From February through May 2012, Jet Asia flew daily charters between Bangkok's Suvarnabhumi International Airport and Tokyo’s Narita International Airport on behalf of Japanese travel agency H.I.S. Seasonal charters between Bangkok and Tokyo resumed in July 2012 and again in July 2013 with additional service to Osaka. Starting in January 2013, after partnering with CITS Air Service (a subsidiary of China International Travel Service, China’s largest integrated travel network), the airline began operating charters to more than 40 cities and offering regularly scheduled service between Bangkok, Phuket and six cities in China: Beijing, Nanjing, Chongqing, Tianjin, Shenyang and Changsha.

In late 2014 the airline began four times weekly scheduled services to Tokyo (Narita) using Boeing 767-200 aircraft. Further scheduled services to be launched include Jakarta, Jeddah and Tianjin.

== Destinations ==
City	Country	ATA	CAO	Airport
Bangkok	Thailand	BKK	VTBS	Suvarnabhumi Airport
Jakarta	Indonesia	CGK	WIII	Soekarno–Hatta International Airport
Jeddah	Saudi Arabia	JED	OEJN	King Abdulaziz International Airport
Seoul	South Korea	ICN	RKSI	Incheon International Airport
Tokyo	Japan	NRT	RJAA	Narita International Airport

== Fleet ==
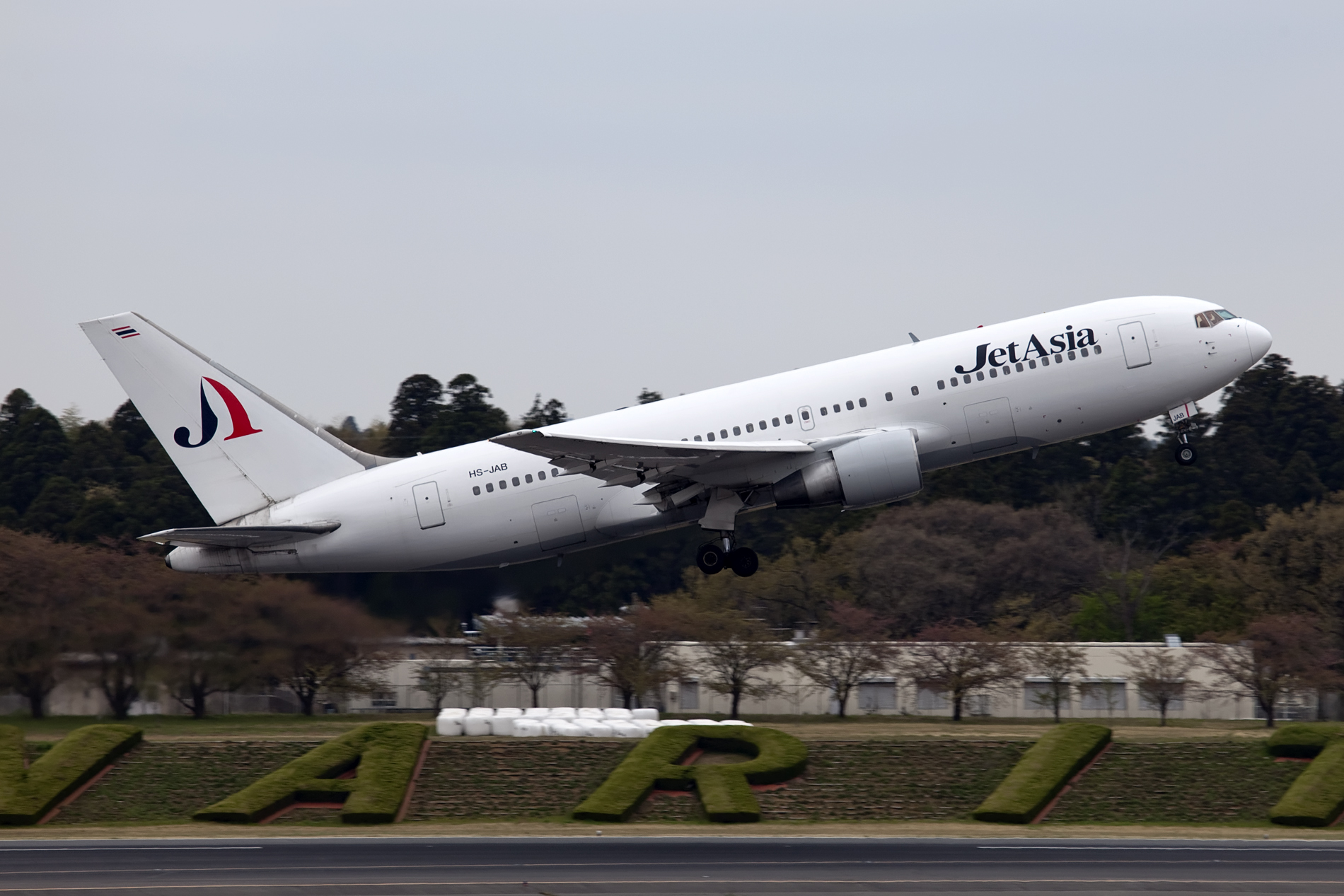
A Jet Asia Boeing 767 taking off from Narita International Airport (April 2012)

The Jet Asia Airways fleet consisted of the following aircraft (as of August 2016):

Jet Asia Airways passenger fleet
Aircraft	In Service	Orders	Passengers					Notes
Aircraft	In Service	Orders	F	C	P	Y	Total	Notes
Boeing 767-200ER	2	—	—	—	—	235	235	
Total	2	—						
