= Thai Tiger Airways =

Proposed low-cost airline of Thailand

IATA	ICAO	Call sign
TI	TGA	THAI TIGER
- Founded: August 2010
- Ceased operations: 19 September 2011
- Operating bases: Don Mueang International Airport
- Parent company: Thai Airways International (51%); Tiger Airways Holdings (39%); RyanThai (10%)
- Headquarters: Bangkok, Thailand

Thai Tiger Airways was a planned low fare airline, based in Bangkok, Thailand.

It was formed in 2010 as a joint venture between Tiger Airways of Singapore and Thailand's flag carrier Thai Airways International. However, the plan was scrapped on 19 September 2011 by Thai Airways International. As a result of this, Thai Tiger Airways became superfluous when Thai Smile made a successful launch.

== History ==
The board of directors of Thai Airways International plc had agreed to co-invest with Tiger Airways Holdings Limited to set up a new low-cost airline, as said by the executive director of the Legal Department at Thai Niruth Maneepan.

The low-cost airlines, Thai Tiger Airways, was to have an initial capital of 200 million baht. Thai would invest 99.6 million baht, or 49.8 per cent in the new joint venture. Thai's affiliate firms would take 1.2 per cent stake, and Tiger Airlines Holdings would hold the remaining 49 per cent.

The co-investment memorandum of understanding was signed on Monday, 2 August 2010, by Thai president Piyasvasti Amranand and Tiger Airlines Holdings CEO Tony Davis.

It would serve regularly scheduled domestic and international flights from Bangkok's Suvarnabhumi Airport in Thailand.

Thai Tiger Airways would be the second low-cost airline operating both domestic and international flights from the Suvarnabhumi Airport. Plans were made to commence operations in the first quarter of 2011, pending regulatory approvals. Thai Tiger would operate international and domestic flights offering short-haul, point-to-point services within a 5-hour flying radius. Thai Tiger had originally planned to commence operations in May 2011, though by July 2011 the Thai government had not yet approved the airline.

It faced objections from incumbent future competitors Bangkok Airways, Nok Air and Thai AirAsia.

Instead, on 19 August 2011, a new airline, Thai Wings, was created. That airline successfully made its first flight on 7 July 2012 under the name of Thai Smile, with Thai Tiger Airways officially defunct.

== Fleet ==
Thai Tiger Airways would have used Suvarnabhumi Airport as its gateway to fly to other nations in Southeast Asia.

Thai Tiger Airways fleet
Aircraft	In fleet	Orders	Passengers	Notes
Airbus A320-200	0	15	180	New leather seating configuration.
