= Thai Regional Airlines =

Airline based in Thailand

| IATA | ICAO | Call sign |
|---|---|---|
| RW | TRB | THAI REGIONAL |
- Founded: August 2011
- Ceased operations: 2013
- Hubs: Suvarnabhumi Airport
- Website: www.thairegionalairlines.com

Thai Regional Airlines was a short-lived airline based in Bangkok, Thailand. Their fleet included Piper PA-31-350 Navajo Chieftain, and Airbus A320 aircraft. The airline planned to start A320 service to Chiang Mai and Phuket on 12 December 2012, with a promotion of 1000 baht per seat. However, two days before 12 December, the airline canceled all flights until 24 December, leaving paid passengers no alternative. On 21 December, for the second time, the airline cancelled all flights until 1 April 2013, citing "document and aircraft import difficulty" as a reason. This time the airline offered a full refund to passengers. Most of the passengers, however, did not receive a refund, and their calls to the office were not answered.
