= U Airlines =

Airline of Thailand (2012 - now)

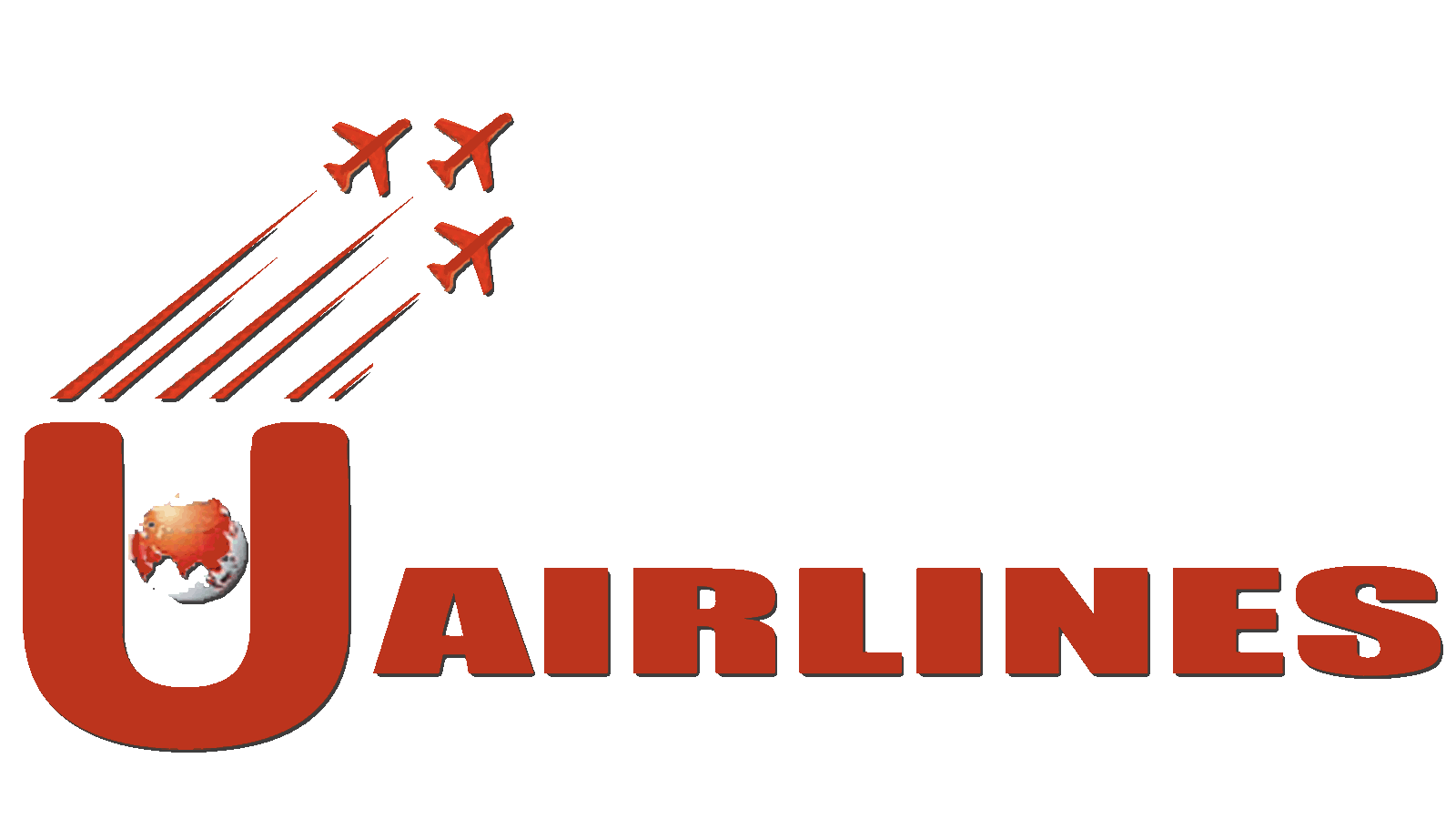
IATA	ICAO	Call sign
—	ULG	UNICORN
- Founded: April 2012
- Commenced operations: 16 September 2012
- Hubs: Suvarnabhumi Airport
- Parent company: U Airlines Co., Ltd
- Headquarters: 246, Time Square Building, 15–01 RM-15th Floor, Between Sukhumvit 12 and 14, Klong Toei, Klong Toei, Bangkok Thailand 10110
- Website: www.u-airlines.com

U Airlines (Thai: ยู แอร์ไลน์) was an airline based in Thailand. It began operations in April 2012, and operated only charter flights.

== Fleet ==
As of August 2014, U Airlines has one Airbus A320-200.
