= Wisdom Airways =

Regional airline of Thailand (2017–2019)

| IATA | ICAO | Call sign |
|---|---|---|
| — | GBJ | — |
- Founded: 1 December 2017
- Ceased operations: 1 October 2019
- Operating bases: Chiang Mai International Airport
- Headquarters: Chiang Mai, Thailand
- Website: www.wisdomairways.com/index.php

Wisdom Airways was a short-lived regional airline operating in northwestern Thailand, with a base in Chiang Mai International Airport. On 1 October 2019, the airline ceased all operations permanently.

== History ==
Wisdom Airways sought to take over the routes of Kan Air after that airline went out of business. Although the airline employed the same pilots and operated the same routes as Kan Air, it denied any links to it. The airline began operations on 1 December 2017.

On 1 October 2019, the airline announced on their official Facebook page that they would be suspending all operations until further notice.

== Fleet ==
Wisdom Airways had operated several Cessna 208 Caravan aircraft, including HS-WIA and HS-WIS.

It also had plans to acquire a larger aircraft, a DHC-6 Twin Otter.

== Destinations ==
On 25 June 2018, the airline began operating a route between Chiang Mai and Mae Hong Son.
