= Pak Phun =

Subdistrict of Thailand

Coordinates: 8.499882°N 99.954532°E

Pak Phun (Thai: ปากพูน) is a tambon (subdistrict) of Mueang Nakhon Si Thammarat district, Nakhon Si Thammarat province, southern Thailand.

== History ==
During World War II the Japanese army landed in Pak Phun. They were heavily opposed by the Thai army led by Major General Luang Senanrong. The commander of the 6th Army Region was the commander-in-chief, leading combat operations at the Ban Tha Phae front. A fierce battle ensued. The Thai army forced Japan to retreat. After the war ended, the Wirathai Monument marked the bravery of the Thai soldiers. It is known locally as Pho Ja Dam Monument.

Pak Phun means mouth of a river with accumulated sediments, because the area was a river mouth full of mangrove forests. The first element pak (Thai: ปาก) means mouth or river mouth; the second element phun (Thai: พูน) means increase or accumulate.

== Geography ==
Pak Phun has a flat terrain situated on the Gulf of Thailand. The coastline is full of fertile mangrove forests. The Khlong Pak Phun and the Khlong Pak Phaying canals that empty into the Gulf are important water resources.

It is an uppermost part of the district. Pak Phun is about 10 minutes from Nakhon Si Thammarat.

Pak Phun's mangrove forest covers an area of approximately 2,000 rais (790.51 acres) and is a habitat for a variety of edible aquatic animal resources such as oyster, mud crab, mullet, spotted scat, sea bass, eeltail catfish etc.

== Administration ==
The subdistrict is under the administration of two government bodies; Mueang Pak Phun Municipality and Tambon Tha Phae Municipality.

It is divided into 12 administrative mubans (villages).

No.	Name	Thai
1.	Ban Tha Phae	บ้านท่าแพ
2.	Ban Don Talae	บ้านดอนทะเล
3.	Ban Sak Ngam	บ้านสักงาม
4.	Ban Huai Sai	บ้านห้วยไทร
5.	Ban Suan Chan	บ้านสวนจันทร์
6.	Ban Tha Tian	บ้านท่าเตียน
7.	Ban Bo Pho	บ้านบ่อโพธิ์
8.	Ban Pak Phun	บ้านปากพูน
9.	Ban Talat Paruehat	บ้านตลาดพฤหัส
10.	Ban Sala Bang Pu	บ้านศาลาบางปู
11.	Ban Pak Phaying	บ้านปากพยิง
12.	Ban Pak Nam Kao	บ้านปากน้ำเก่า

== Population ==
As of December 2022, it had a total population of 38,336.

== Economy ==
Occupations include fishing, gardening, rice farming and tourism, especially ecotourism and rural tourism.
