= Asia Atlantic Airlines =

Charter airline of Thailand (2012–2018)

Asia Atlantic Airlines เอเชีย แอตแลนติก แอร์ไลน์ส

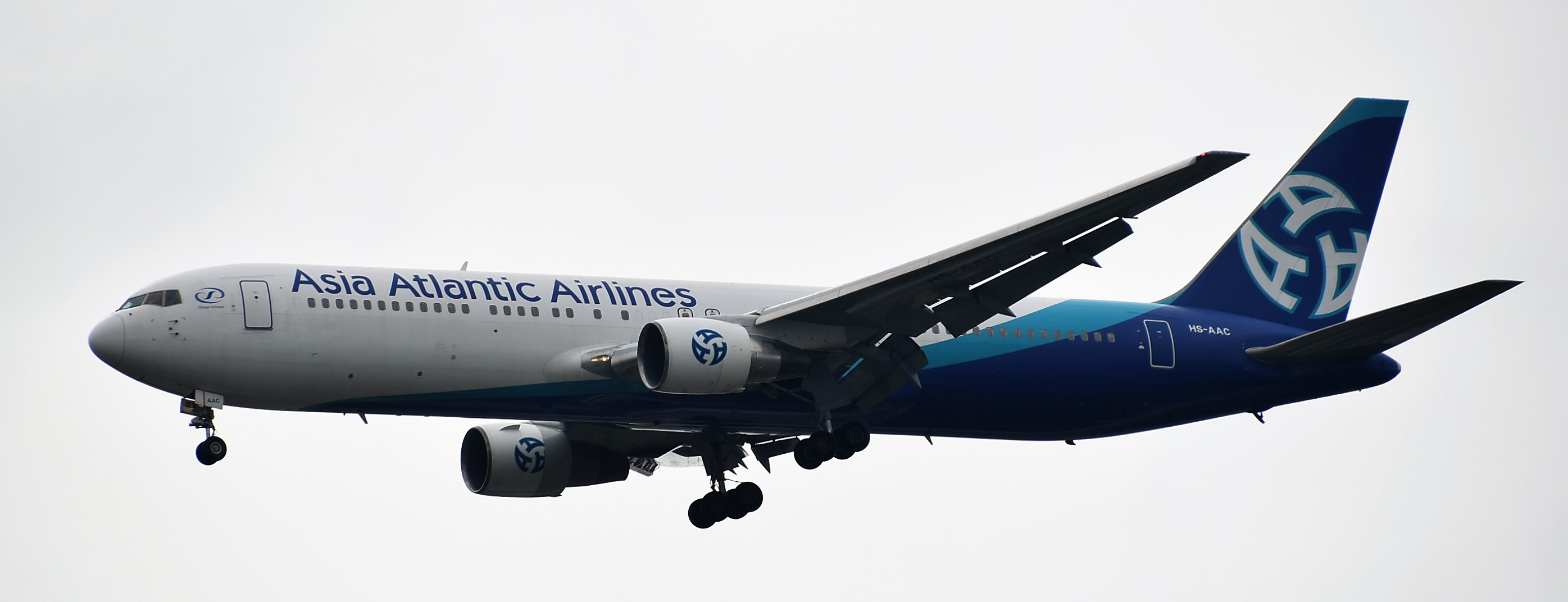
IATA	ICAO	Call sign
HB	AAQ	ASIA ATLANTIC
- Founded: December 2012; 13 years ago
- Commenced operations: August 19, 2013
- Ceased operations: October 30, 2018
- Operating bases: Suvarnabhumi Airport
- Parent company: H.I.S. Co., Ltd.
- Headquarters: Bangkok, Thailand
- Key people: Bobby A. Haque (President)
- Website: www.asiaatlanticairlines.com

Asia Atlantic Airlines (Thai: เอเชีย แอตแลนติก แอร์ไลน์ส) was a charter airline headquartered in Bangkok, Thailand. It was a subsidiary of the Japanese travel agency H.I.S. The airline ceased operations on 30 October 2018.

In April 2024, Asia Atlantic Airlines rebranded as AirThailand. However, on 20 February 2026, the Civil Aviation Authority of Thailand (CAAT) removed the carrier from its list of Air Operator Certificate (AOC) holders. This regulatory move effectively terminated the airline's plans for a relaunch.

== History ==
Asia Atlantic Airlines (AAA) launched initiated operations on maiden flight departed Suvarnabhumi Airport for Narita International Airport on August 19, 2013.

The airline was a joint venture between Japanese travel agent H.I.S and Thai hotelier Baiyoke Group.

Asia Atlantic Airlines operated out of two hubs: Bangkok Suvarnabhumi and Tokyo Narita International Airport. The fleet consisted of two B767-300ERs with two configurations – the first one (HS-AAC) had 252 seats, including 12 business and 240 economy class; and the second one (HS-AAB) consisted of 261 seats, with 18 business and 243 economy class seats.

== Corporate affairs ==
The airline head office was on the 11th floor of the Times Square Building in Khlong Toei District, Bangkok.

== Destinations ==
Asia Atlantic Airlines served or planned to serve the following destinations:

Country	City	Airport	Notes	Refs
China	Shenyang	Shenyang Taoxian International Airport	Terminated	
Japan	Aomori	Aomori Airport	Terminated	
Japan	Fukushima	Fukushima Airport	Terminated	
Japan	Hiroshima	Hiroshima Airport	Terminated	
Japan	Nagoya	Chubu Centrair International Airport	Terminated	
Japan	Osaka	Kansai International Airport	Terminated	
Japan	Sapporo	New Chitose Airport	Terminated	
Japan	Tokyo	Narita International Airport	Terminated	
Singapore	Singapore	Changi Airport	Terminated	
Thailand	Bangkok	Suvarnabhumi Airport	Hub	
Thailand	Phuket	Phuket International Airport	Terminated	

== Fleet ==
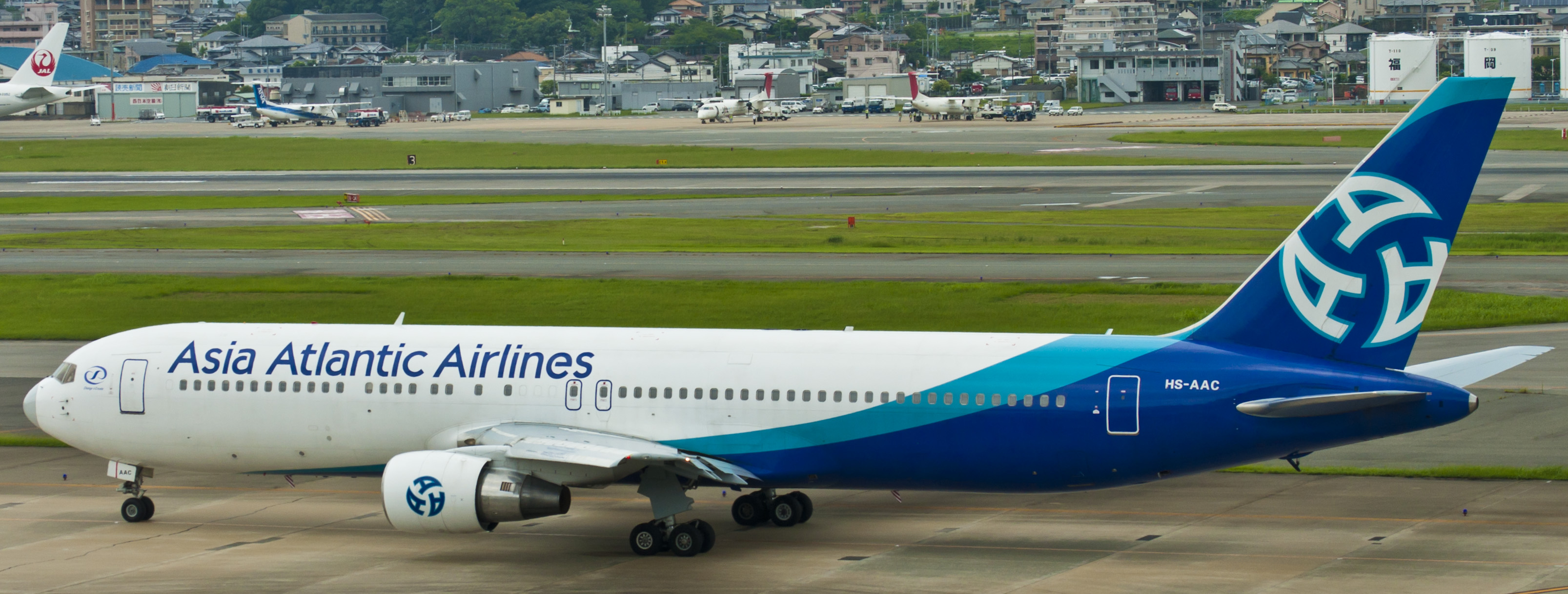
Boeing 767-300ER

The Asia Atlantic Airlines fleet consisted of the following aircraft (as of August 2016):

Asia Atlantic Airlines fleet
Aircraft	In Fleet	Orders	Passengers			Notes
Aircraft	In Fleet	Orders	C	Y	Total	Notes
Boeing 767-300ER	2	3	18	243	261	
Total	2	3				
