= H.I.S. (travel agency) =

Japanese travel agency

H.I.S. Co., Ltd.
- Native name: 株式会社エイチ・アイ・エス
- Type: Public KK
- Traded as: TYO: 9603
- Industry: Travel
- Founded: December 19, 1980; 45 years ago
- Founder: Hideo Sawada
- Headquarters: Kamiyacho Trust Tower 5F 4-1-1 Toranomon, Minato-ku, 105-6905, Tokyo, Japan
- Number of locations: H.I.S. currently has 233 retail outlets in 66 countries, 141 overseas cities
- Services: Travel, Tourism, Transportation
- Revenue: Net Sales 523 Billion 705 Million Yen (2016)
- Operating income: 8 Billion 700 Million Yen
- Net income: 8 Billion 903 Million Yen (2016)
- Total assets: Total Assets 332,385 Million Yen (2016)
- Number of employees: 14,380 (October 31, 2016)
- Website: https://www.his.co.jp/english/

H.I.S. Co., Ltd. (株式会社エイチ・アイ・エス, Kabushiki-gaisha Eichi Ai Esu) is a travel agency based on the fifth floor of Trust Tower in Kamiya-cho, Tokyo in Kamiyacho, Minatoku, Tokyo, Japan, specializing in low-cost package tours. The company was founded as International Tours Co., Ltd. in 1980 by Hideo Sawada, born in 1951, and renamed "H.I.S." in 1990.

In Japan, H.I.S. has 303 branches throughout the country and a global network of 185 branches in 124 cities abroad. H.I.S. holds a majority stake in Orion Tour, Asia Atlantic Airlines and a minority stake in Skymark Airlines. It owns two hotels in Australia, one called Watermark Hotel and Spa on the Gold Coast, Queensland and the Watermark Hotel Brisbane, and a cruise company called Cruise Planet. In 2021, H.I.S. estimated record loss of ¥53 billion due to pandemic.

Hideo Sawada bought an interest in the Mongolian agricultural Khan Bank and believes Japanese tourism to Mongolia will increase. Sawada Holdings Co., Ltd also owns 40% of the shares of the Russian bank Solid Bank.

The Henn na Hotel owned by H.I.S. Co . in Sasebo, Nagasaki Prefecture, has been recognized by Guinness World Records as “the first robot-staffed hotel” in the world, according to the chief of the Huis Ten Bosch theme park. Henn na Hotel, meaning "strange hotel" in Japanese, opened to the public in July 2015. This high class robot hotel has 144 rooms and 186 robotic employees, some of which are multilingual (Japanese, English, Chinese, Korean). The aim of Henn na Hotel as proposed by Hideo Sawada is that by "having robots in charge of the reception and placing robots everywhere, we aim to make it the most efficient hotel in the world" by reducing manpower.
