= Intira Airlines =

Thai airline

IATA	ICAO	Call sign
8B	BCC	THAI BIZ
- Founded: 2008
- Ceased operations: 2015
- Operating bases: Suvarnabhumi Airport
- Fleet size: 2
- Destinations: 4
- Headquarters: Bangkok, Thailand
- Website: intiraair.com

Intira Airlines (also spelled "Airline"; formerly Business Air) was a charter airline based at Suvarnabhumi Airport in Bangkok, Thailand.

== History ==
Business Air was formed in 2008 to accommodate the tourism industry and other aviation charter services. It was granted the Air Operator License and Air Operator Certificate from Department of Civil Aviation (Thailand) (DCA) in November 2009, permitting international operations, with its first flight in December 2009.

The carrier has since experienced financial difficulties, with unpaid fees of fuel surcharge, air traffic control services and aircraft lessors for more than 1 billion THB (approx. 30.7 million USD), which caused the DCA to ordered Business Air to suspend its operation on 16 January 2015, leaving more than 1,000 passengers affected. However, on 24 January 2015, the Administrative Court of Thailand granted a preliminary injunction, allowing the airline to resume operations in the wake of ongoing liability and litigation. The airline was rebranded as "Intira Airlines" in June 2015 under the new ownership, but never launched.

== Destinations ==
South Korea

- Seoul - Incheon International Airport

Saudi Arabia

- Jeddah - King Abdulaziz International Airport

Thailand

- Bangkok - Suvarnabhumi Airport (base)
- Narathiwat - Narathiwat Airport

== Fleet ==
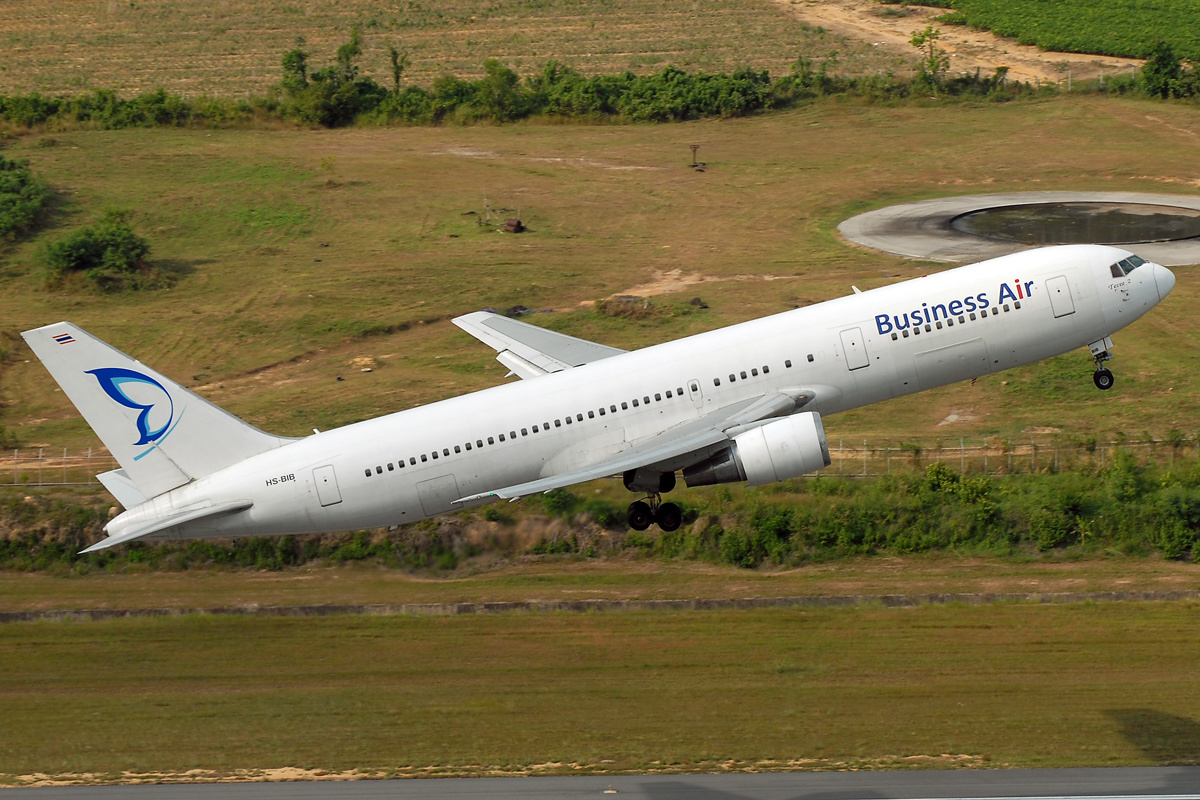
Boeing 767-300ER in Business Air livery

Business Air fleet
Aircraft	In fleet	Passenger			
Aircraft	In fleet	J	Y+	Y	Total
Boeing 767-300ER	2	32	—	189	221
Boeing 767-300ER	2	—	—	251	251
