= Orient Thai Airlines =

Airline of Thailand (1995–2018)

Orient Thai Airlines โอเรียนท์ ไทย แอร์ไลน์
IATA	ICAO	Call sign
OX	OEA	ORIENT THAI
- Founded: August 1995 (as Orient Express Air)
- Commenced operations: January 1997
- Ceased operations: July 2018 (flight operations); 9 October 2018 (liquidation)
- Operating bases: Don Mueang International Airport
- Subsidiaries: One-Two-Go Airlines (2003–2010)
- Fleet size: 14
- Destinations: 5
- Headquarters: First: Don Mueang district, Bangkok; Final: Khlong Toei district, Bangkok
- Key people: Kajit Habanananda (Chairman)
- Website: FlyOrientThai.com

Orient Thai Airlines Co., Ltd. was an airline with its head office in Khlong Toei, Bangkok, Thailand. It operated charter and scheduled services in Southeast Asia and was based at Don Mueang International Airport. On 9 October 2018, the airline ceased all operations.

== History ==
Orient Thai Airlines and its now-defunct wholly owned domestic carrier One-Two-GO Airlines are the only Thai airlines to bear a royal seal, made possible by the owner's, Udom Tantiprasonchai, close relationship with the King of Thailand, based on Mr. Tantiprasongchai's history of breaking traditional commercial barriers for Thailand. Prior to their current location, Orient Thai and its subsidiary One-Two-GO were headquartered in Don Mueang District, Bangkok.

On 22 July 2008, shortly after the crash of One-Two-GO Airlines Flight 269 in Phuket which killed 89 people, and after the Internet publication of illegally excessive work hours and check ride fraud, Orient Thai and One-Two-GO were ordered to suspend service for 56 days.

On 22 September 2010, Orient Thai took delivery of its first Boeing 747-400 aircraft, previously registered as N548MD, and arrived at the Orient Thai base as HS-STC. In November 2015, Orient Thai Airways signed a contract with the Amadeus IT Group to be listed in Global Distribution Systems for the first time.

In early May 2016, the airline was sanctioned for the second time within a few weeks by the Civil Aviation Administration of China after violating regulations. In September 2017, Orient Thai Airlines temporarily suspended all operations. In December 2017, it resumed services after completing re-certification with the Thai aviation authorities.

By the end of July 2018, Orient Thai Airlines suspended all operations and entered a restructuring process. The airline later ceased operations and filed for bankruptcy in October 2018. On 5 January 2021, the Royal Gazette published an announcement declaring Orient Thai Airlines bankrupt and ordering the Legal Execution Department to seize its remaining assets to pay its debtors. Two weeks later, the founder of the airline died at age 66.

== Destinations ==
As of November 2017, Orient Thai Airlines served the following scheduled destinations:

Thailand

- Bangkok — Don Mueang International Airport (Base)

People's Republic of China

- Changsha — Changsha Huanghua International Airport
- Nanchang — Nanchang Changbei International Airport
- Shanghai — Shanghai Pudong International Airport

Australia

- Brisbane — Brisbane Airport

== Fleet ==
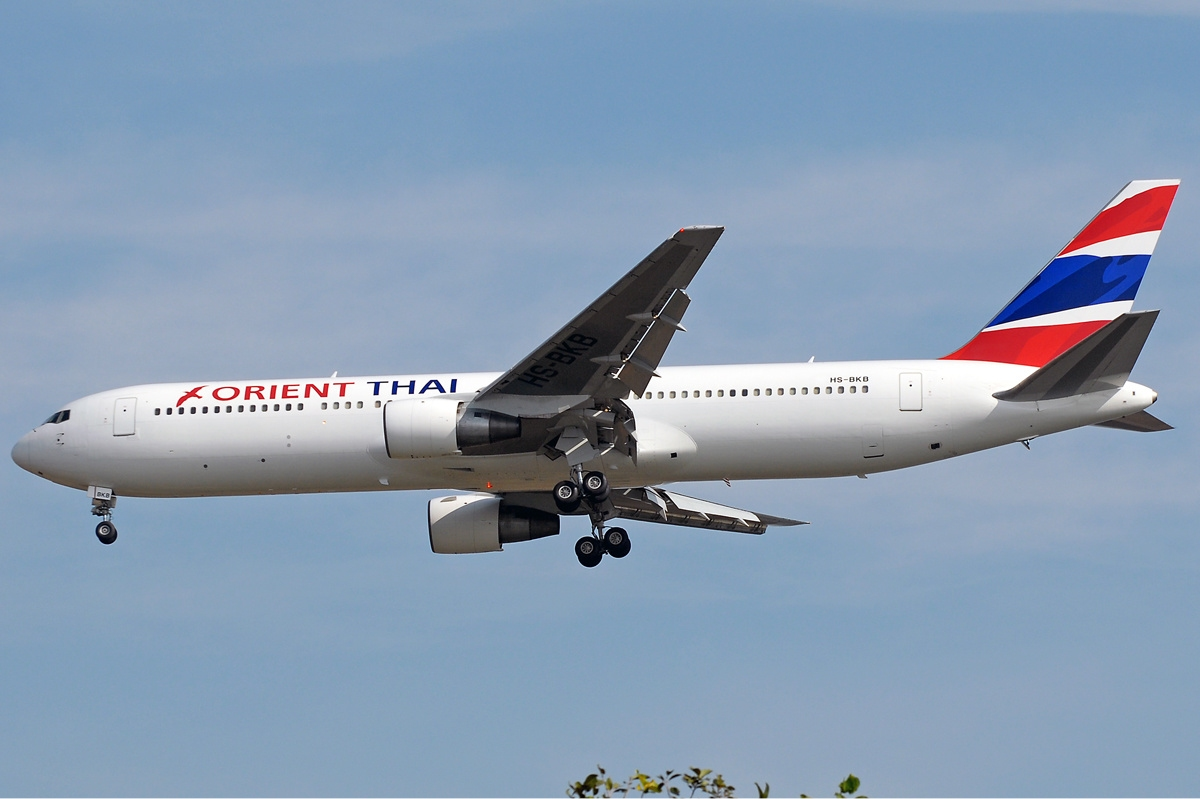
Orient Thai Airlines Boeing 767-300

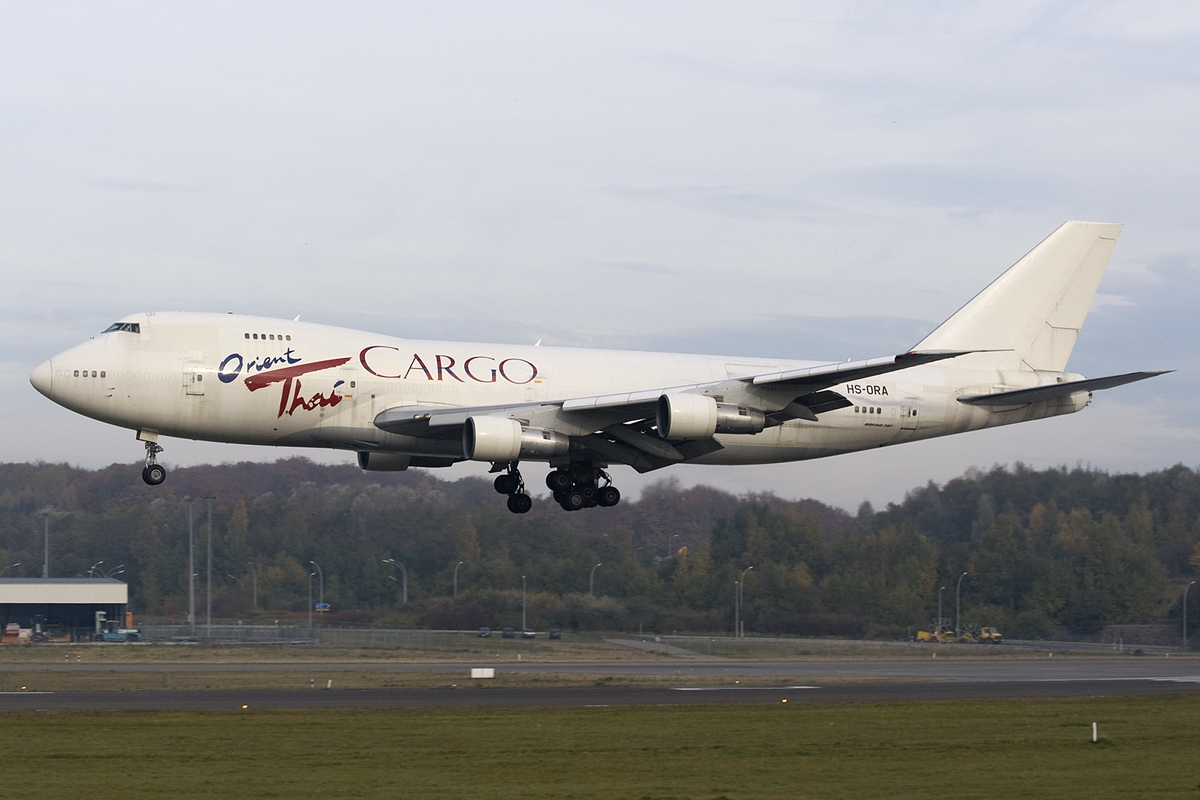
Former Orient Thai Cargo Boeing 747-200SF

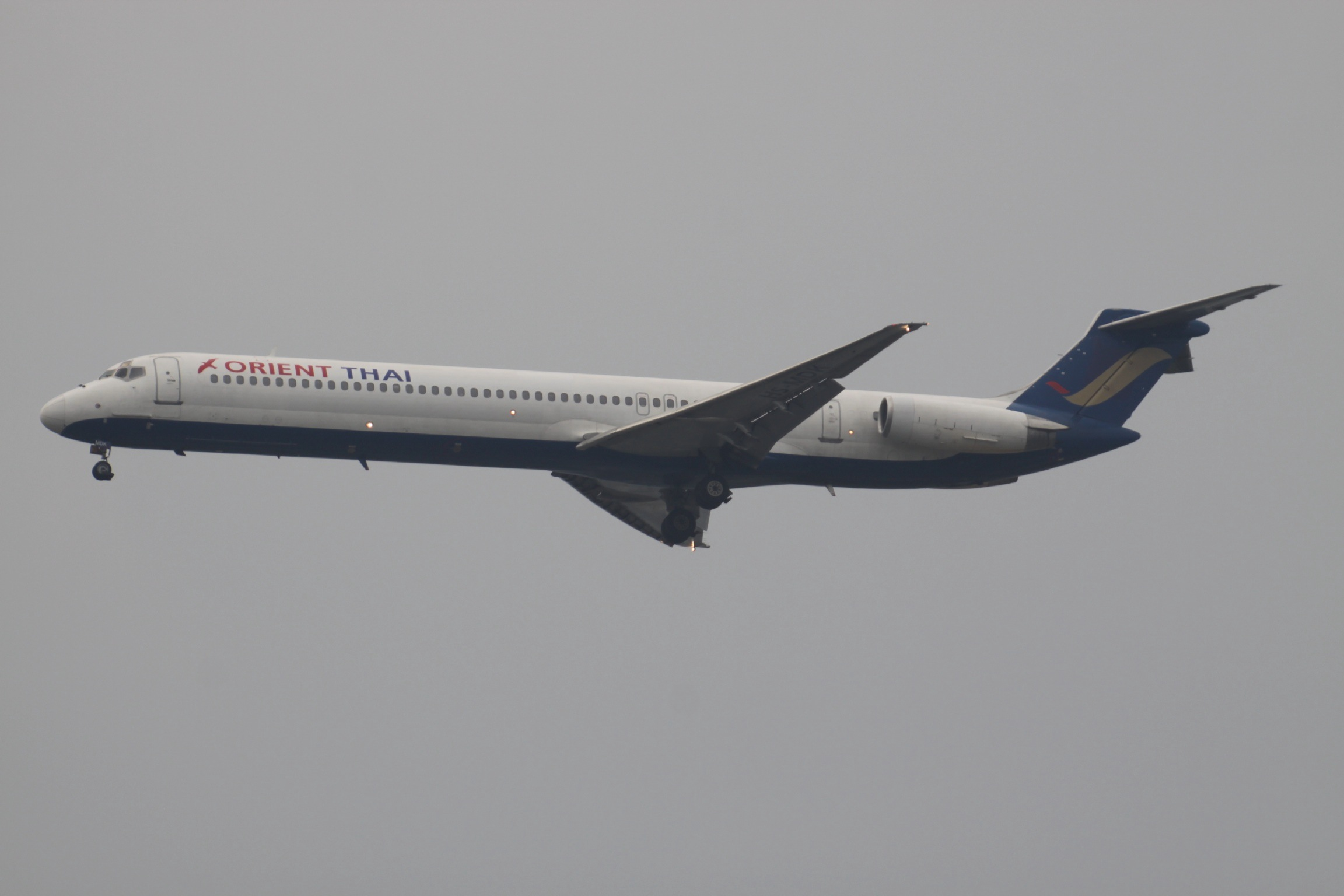
Former Orient Thai Airlines McDonnell Douglas MD-82

During its history, Orient Thai Airlines operated a wide range of pre-owned aircraft:

Oriental Thai Airlines fleet
Aircraft	Total	Introduced	Retired	Notes
Boeing 737-300	8	2011	2018	
Boeing 737-400	2	2012	2018	
Boeing 747-100	2	2002	2008	
Boeing 747-100SR/SUD	2	2006	2009	
Boeing 747-200B	8	2001	2009	
Boeing 747-200F	1	2008	2008	
Boeing 747-300	6	2006	2014	
Boeing 747-300M	1	2009	2009	
Boeing 747-400	4	2013	2016	
Boeing 747-400M	1	2012	2013	
Boeing 767-300	5	2011	2017	
Boeing 767-300ER	3	2012	2018	
Lockheed L-1011 TriStar	6	1997	2004	
McDonnell Douglas MD-81	2	2011	2012	
McDonnell Douglas MD-82	2	2011	2013	

== Incidents and accidents ==
- September 2004: An Orient Thai Boeing 747 mistakenly flew within 200 meters of Japan's Tokyo Tower over the heart of downtown Tokyo.
- 31 July 2013: A chartered Orient Thai Boeing 737-400 operating as flight OX833 made an emergency landing at Surat Thani International Airport, carrying Chinese passengers from Shenzhen to Phuket. None of the 130 passengers and nine crew was injured.

== See also ==
- List of defunct airlines of Thailand
