= Don Mueang International Airport =

Secondary commercial airport serving Bangkok, Thailand

Don Mueang International Airport ท่าอากาศยานดอนเมือง

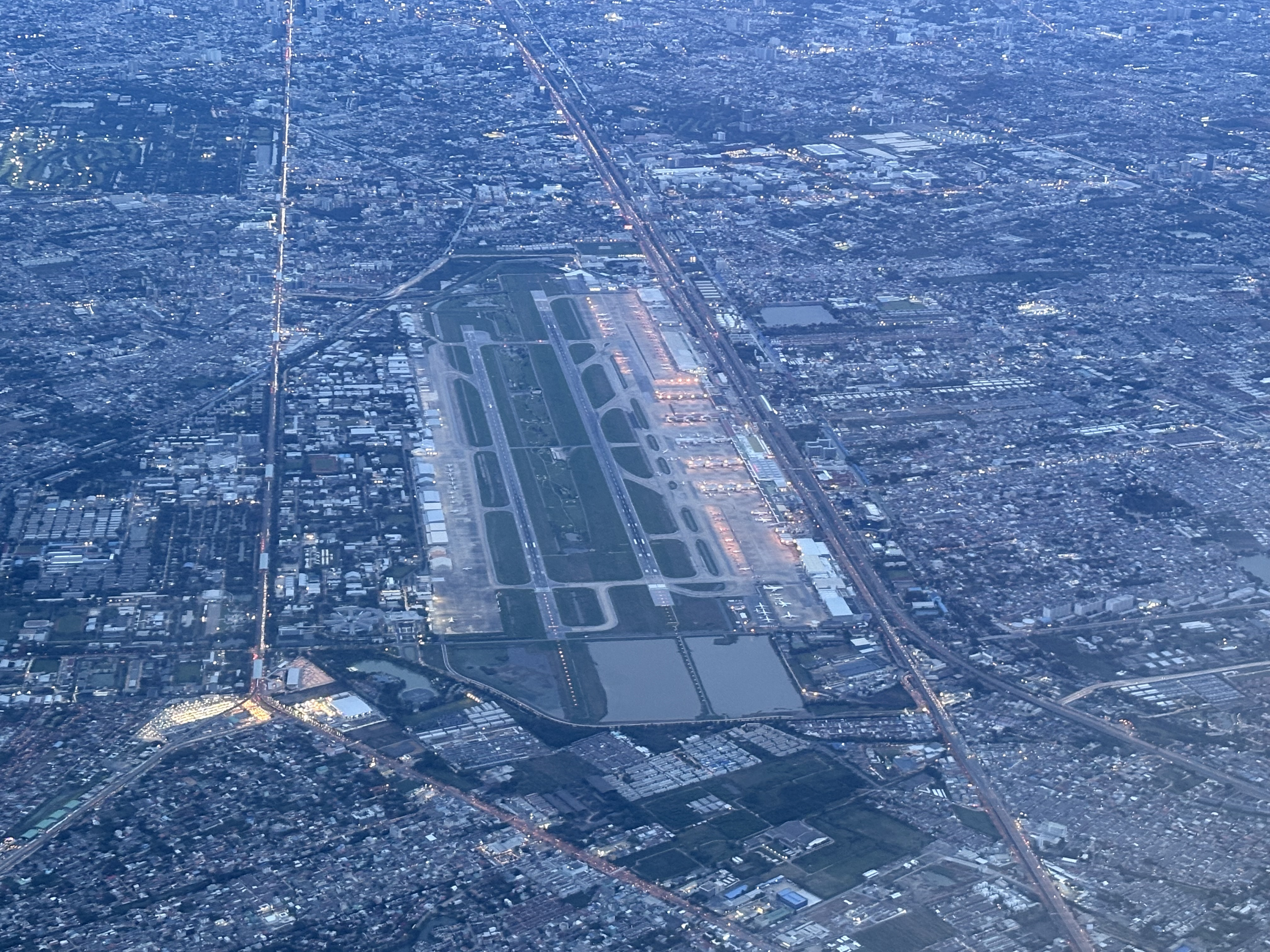
- Aerial view of Don Mueang International Airport in 2026
- IATA: DMK (Note: Previously BKK until 2006, when the new Suvarnabhumi Airport started using it.); ICAO: VTBD

Summary
- Airport type: Public
- Owner: Royal Thai Air Force
- Operator: Airports of Thailand
- Serves: Bangkok Metropolitan Region
- Location: 222 Vibhavadi Rangsit Road, Sanambin, Don Mueang, Bangkok, Thailand
- Opened: 27 March 1914; 112 years ago
- Operating base for: Nok Air; Thai AirAsia; Thai AirAsia X; Thai Lion Air
- Elevation AMSL: 9 ft (2.7 m)
- Coordinates: 13°54′45″N 100°36′24″E
- Website: donmueang.airportthai.co.th

Maps
- Bangkok in Thailand
- Location in Bangkok Location in Thailand Location in Southeast Asia
- Interactive map of Don Mueang International Airport

Runways
Direction	Length		Surface
Direction	m	ft	Surface
03L/21R	3,700	12,139	Asphalt concrete
03R/21L	3,500	11,483	Asphalt concrete

Statistics (2025)
- Total passengers: 31,650,816▲3.81%
- International passengers: 12,243,429▼3.31%
- Domestic passengers: 19,407,387▲8.86%
- Aircraft movements: 214,723 ▲4.40%
- Freight (tonnes): 55,568 ▲116.36%
- Sources: Airports of Thailand

Don Mueang International Airport (IATA: DMK, ICAO: VTBD) — known as Bangkok International Airport before 2006 — is one of two international airports serving Bangkok, the capital of Thailand, the other being Suvarnabhumi Airport (BKK).

The airport is regarded as one of the world's oldest international airports and among the oldest operating airports in Asia. It officially opened as a Royal Thai Air Force (RTAF) base on 27 March 1914, though it had been used earlier as a landing field. The first commercial flight to Don Mueang occurred in 1924, marking it as one of the world's earliest commercial aviation facilities. The inaugural commercial service was operated by KLM Royal Dutch Airlines on a flight between Amsterdam and Bangkok.

Throughout the 20th century, Don Mueang served as Thailand's primary aviation hub and one of the key gateways for international air traffic in Southeast Asia. During World War II, the airport was occupied and utilized by the Imperial Japanese Army Air Service, later returning to Thai control after the war's end. In the postwar era, Don Mueang rapidly expanded its civil aviation facilities, accommodating the rise of jet aircraft and the growing international demand for travel to Bangkok.

By the 1970s and 1980s, the airport underwent significant modernization, including the construction of new passenger terminals and cargo facilities. For several decades, it was the main hub of Thai Airways International and the country's flag carrier, handling the majority of Thailand’s international and domestic flights. Don Mueang's IATA airport code was originally BKK, which was later reassigned to Suvarnabhumi Airport following its opening in 2006.

At its peak in 2004, Don Mueang handled over 38 million passengers, 160,000 flights, and nearly 700,000 tons of cargo, ranking as the 14th-busiest airport in the world and the second busiest in Asia by passenger volume. The airport hosted more than 80 airlines and was the primary hub for Thai Airways before the airline relocated operations to Suvarnabhumi.

In September 2006, Don Mueang ceased operations following the opening of Suvarnabhumi Airport, which was intended to fully replace it as Bangkok's main international gateway. After capacity constraints and operational issues arose at Suvarnabhumi, however, Don Mueang was reopened on 24 March 2007 following extensive renovations. It subsequently transitioned into a regional and low-cost airline hub, becoming a cornerstone of Thailand's budget air travel sector.

Since the reopening, Don Mueang has developed into the de facto low-cost carrier hub of Thailand and Southeast Asia. In 2015, it was recognized as the world's largest low-cost carrier airport, surpassing KLIA, Barcelona–El Prat, and Las Vegas.

The airport currently comprises two terminals: Terminal 1, serving international flights, and Terminal 2, serving domestic flights. Both terminals are connected by a glass-enclosed elevated walkway, which also links to the adjacent Amari Don Muang Airport Bangkok hotel. Plans for a Terminal 3 expansion are under development to increase capacity and improve passenger flow, as annual traffic continues to rise.

Today, Don Mueang International Airport remains the second-busiest airport in Thailand after Suvarnabhumi and among the busiest in the region. It serves as the main operating base for Nok Air, Thai AirAsia, Thai AirAsia X, and Thai Lion Air, functioning as a central hub for regional and domestic routes.

== History ==
"Don Mueang" airfield was the second established in Thailand, after Sra Pathum Airfield, which is now Sra Pathum horse racing course, known as the Royal Bangkok Sports Club. The first flights to Don Mueang were made on 8 March 1914 and involved the transfer of aircraft of the Royal Thai Air Force (RTAF). Three years earlier, Thailand had sent three army officers to France to train as pilots. On completion of their training in 1911, the pilots were authorized to purchase seven aircraft, three Breguets and four Nieuports, which formed the basis of the Royal Thai Air Force. Sra Pathum airfield was established in February 1911 with an arrival by Orville Wright, seven years after the invention of the first airplane by the Wright brothers on 17 December 1903.

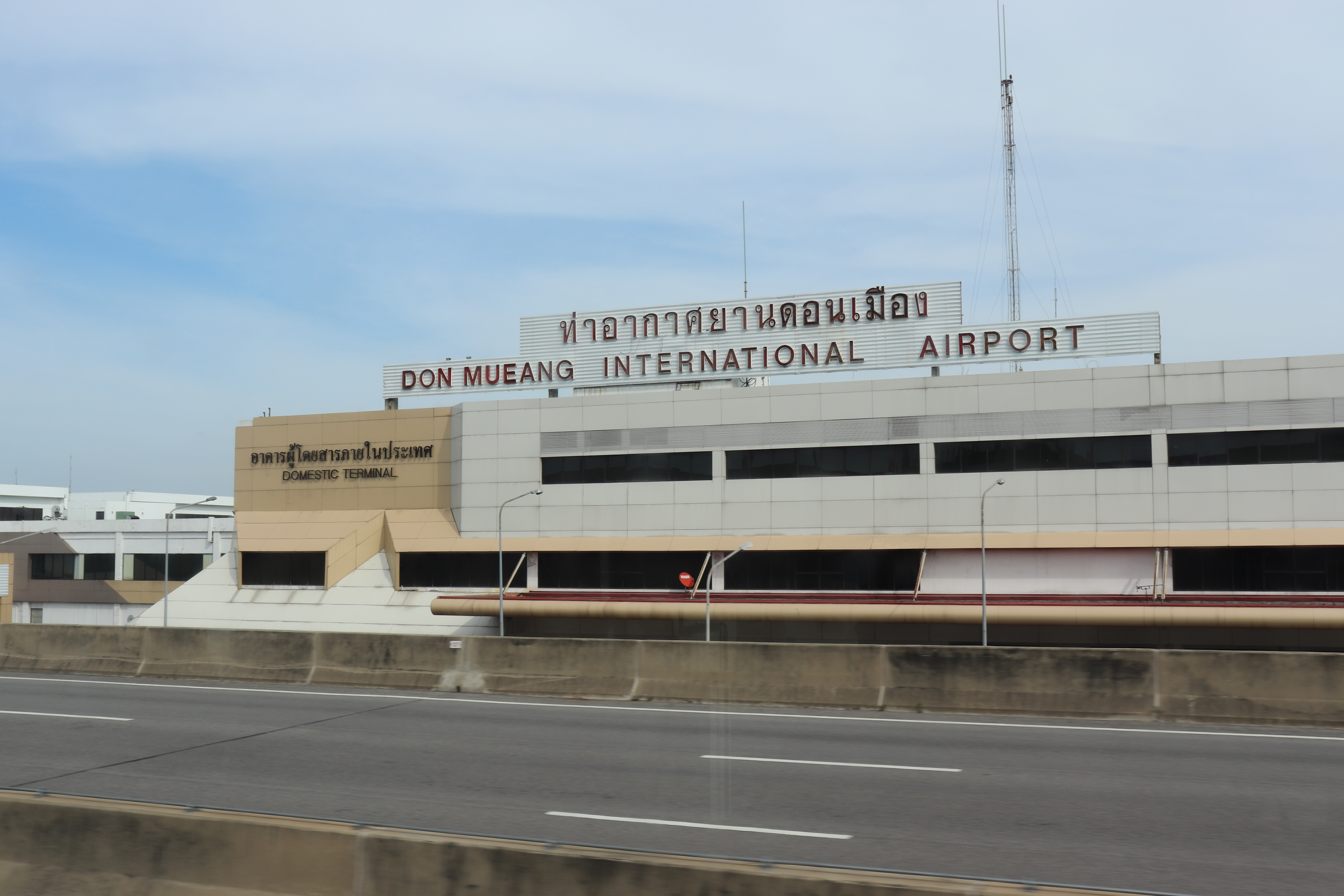
View of Don Mueang International Airport in 2020 from Don Mueang Tollway

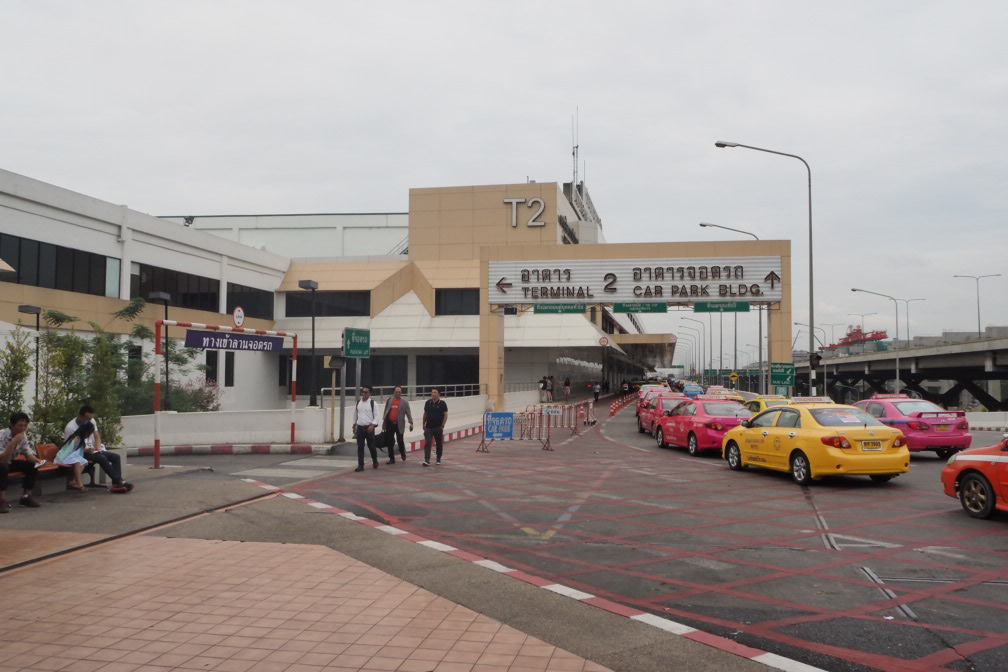
Road into the passenger departure area for Terminal 2

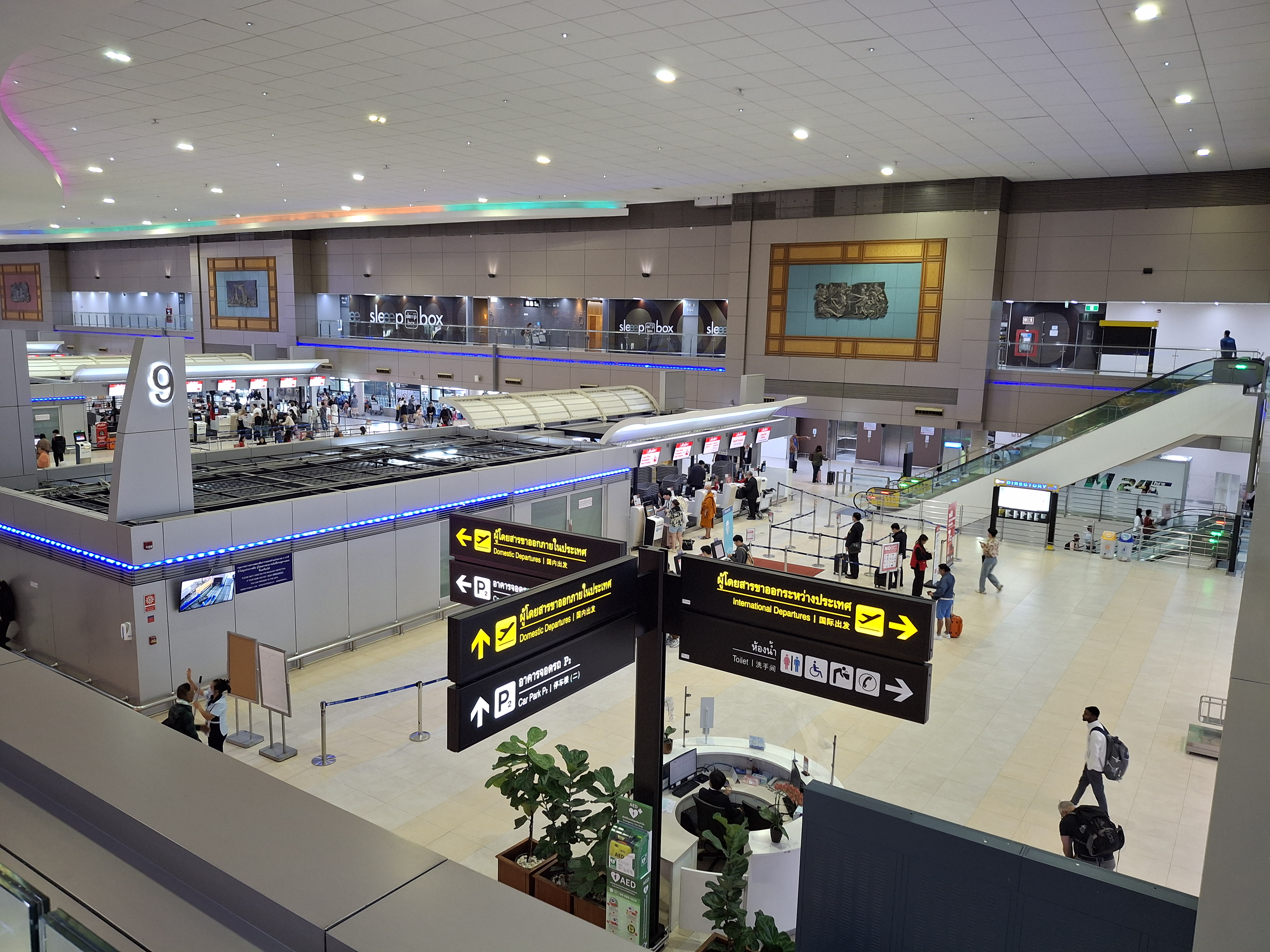
Don Mueang Airport - Terminal 2 (2025)

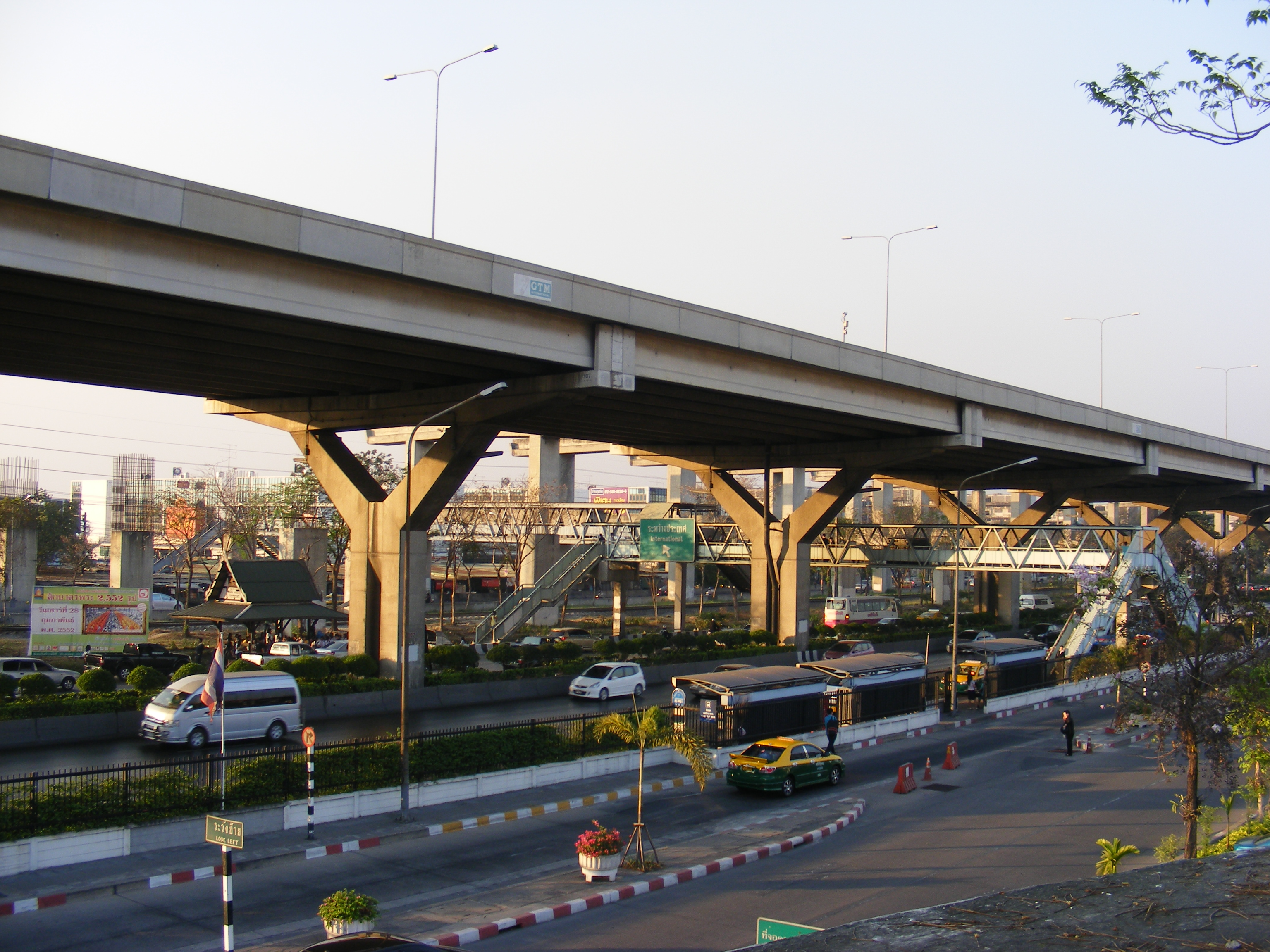
Roads and bridges in front of the domestic terminal

After the war had finished in September 1945, the airfield was occupied by British Royal Air Force during the brief British occupation of Thailand until March 1946 when 211 Squadron, which moved there in October 1945, was disbanded.

In May 2005, Thai Airways International introduced nonstop service between Bangkok and New York City using Airbus A340-500s.

=== Closure ===
The night of 27–28 September 2006 was the official end of operations at Don Mueang airport when the newer Suvarnabhumi Airport was intended to be Bangkok's sole airport when it opened in 2006. The last commercial flights to Don Mueang were:

- International departure: Although scheduled for Kuwait Airways KU414 to Kuwait at 02:50, Qantas flight QF302 to Sydney, originally scheduled for 18:00, was delayed for more than nine hours before finally taking off at 03:12, about ten minutes after the Kuwait flight. Qantas claimed that QF302 was an extra flight.
- International arrival: Kuwait Airways from Jakarta at 01:30
- Domestic departure: Thai Airways TG124 to Chiang Mai at 22:15 (coincidentally, when Thai moved domestic operations back to Don Mueang again on 28 March 2009, their last departure was also a 22:15 flight to Chiang Mai)
- Domestic arrival: Thai Airways TG216 from Phuket at 23:00

Before the opening of Suvarnabhumi, the airport used the IATA airport code BKK and the name was spelled "Don Muang". After Suvarnabhumi opened for commercial flights, the spelling was changed and as "Don Mueang" it assigned the new IATA airport code DMK, though it still retains the ICAO airport code VTBD. The traditional spelling is still used by many airlines and by most Thais.

=== Reopening ===
Commercial carriers deserted Don Mueang at the opening of Suvarnabhumi Airport. But the higher operating costs of the new airport and safety concerns over cracked runways at the new airport caused many to seek a return to Don Mueang. Low-cost airlines led demands for a reopening of the airport. Airports of Thailand released a report at the end of 2006 that furthered this effort. The report proposed reopening DMK as a way to avoid or delay second-stage expansion that had been planned for Suvarnabhumi.

On 30 January 2007, the Ministry of Transport recommended temporarily reopening Don Mueang while touch up work proceeded on some taxiways at Suvarnabhumi.

Because of the 2011 Thailand floods that affected Bangkok and other parts of Thailand, the airport was closed as flood waters flowed onto the runways and affected the lighting. Don Mueang reopened on 6 March 2012.

On 16 March 2012, Prime Minister Yingluck Shinawatra ordered all low-cost, chartered, and non-connecting flights to relocate to Don Mueang. This ended the single-airport policy. Airports of Thailand was ordered to encourage low-cost carriers to shift to Don Mueang to help ease congestion at Suvarnabhumi Airport. Suvarnabhumi Airport was designed to handle 45 million passengers per year, but it processed 48 million in 2011 and the number was expected to reach 53 million in 2012. Some ten airlines may relocate to Don Mueang. Budget airline Nok Air is already serving flights from and to Don Mueang. Nok Air handles about four million passengers per year. Orient Thai Airlines and Thai AirAsia have also started operations at Don Mueang. Thai AirAsia carried 7.2 million passengers in 2011. The number was projected to grow to eight million in 2012.

=== Expansion ===
As of 2012, Terminal 1 is capable of handling 18.5 million passengers annually. On 7 September 2013, Airports of Thailand announced its three billion baht renovation to reopen Terminal 2 as early as May 2014. Terminal 1's passengers in 2013 will likely reach 16 million against its capacity of 18.5 million. Completion of Terminal 2 in December 2015 increases Don Mueang's passenger capacity to 30 million a year.

The third phase of Don Mueang's 36.8 billion baht expansion started in the second half of 2023 and will be completed between 2029 and 2031.

== Events ==
In February 1996, Icelandic singer, songwriter, and composer Björk arrived at Don Mueang with her nine-year-old son at the time, Sindri, after a long-haul flight. Reporters were present, despite Björk's early request that the press leave her and her son alone until a press conference. As Björk attempted to walk away from the paparazzi, television reporter Julie Kaufman approached Sindri and said, "Welcome to Bangkok!" In response, Björk lunged at Kaufman, knocking her to the ground and tossing her until security intervened. Björk later apologised to Kaufman, who declined to press charges. Her record company later stated that Kaufman had been pestering Björk for four days before the incident.

On 7 September 2022 at 21:40 local time, an Airbus A380 made an emergency landing on runway 21R at Don Mueang.

On 30 August 2024, an Airbus Beluga (A300-600ST) made a technical stop at Don Mueang. It departed to China the following day.

== Terminals ==
Don Mueang International Airport has three terminals. Terminal 1 is used for international flights and Terminal 2 for domestic flights. The opening of Terminal 2 has raised the airport's capacity to 30 million passengers per year.

Terminal 3, the old domestic terminal, has been abandoned since 2011. The new Terminal 3 will have a capacity of 20 million passengers yearly and is scheduled to be completed by 2029. The 36.8 billion baht project will raise overall airport capacity from 30 to 50 million annually.

Don Mueang is voted 2024 10th overall terminal for low-cost airlines in the world by Skytrax.

== Airlines and destinations ==
Airlines	Destinations
AirAsia	Kuala Lumpur–International
Bangkok Airways	Koh Samui
Batik Air	Jakarta–Soekarno-Hatta
Batik Air Malaysia	Johor Bahru, Kuala Lumpur–International, Kuala Lumpur–Subang
Cebu Pacific	Cebu, Davao (resumes 2 December 2026), Iloilo (resumes November 23, 2026), Manila
Citilink	Jakarta–Soekarno-Hatta
Flydubai	Dubai–International
Indonesia AirAsia	Medan
Myanmar Airways International	Yangon
Nok Air	Chiang Mai, Chiang Rai, Chumphon, Hat Yai, Hyderabad, Krabi, Mae Sot, Nakhon Si Thammarat, Nan, Nanjing, Phitsanulok, Phuket, Sakon Nakhon, Surat Thani, Trang, Ubon Ratchathani, Udon Thani
Philippines AirAsia	Manila
Spring Airlines	Xiamen, Xi'an
Thai AirAsia	Ahmedabad, Beijing–Daxing, Bengaluru, Buriram, Changsha, Chennai, Chiang Mai, Chiang Rai, Chongqing, Chumphon, Colombo–Bandaranaike, Da Nang, Denpasar, Fukuoka, Gaya, Guangzhou, Guwahati, Hai Phong, Hangzhou, Hanoi, Hat Yai, Ho Chi Minh City, Hong Kong, Hyderabad, Jaipur, Johor Bahru, Kaohsiung, Kathmandu, Khon Kaen, Kochi, Kolkata, Krabi, Kuala Lumpur–International, Kunming, Lampang, Loei, Luang Prabang, Lucknow, Macau, Malé, Naha, Nakhon Phanom, Nakhon Si Thammarat, Nan, Narathiwat, Nha Trang, Penang, Phitsanulok, Phnom Penh, Phu Quoc, Phuket, Ranong, Roi Et, Sakon Nakhon, Shanghai–Pudong, Shenzhen, Siddharthanagar, Siem Reap, Singapore, Surat Thani, Taipei–Taoyuan, Tokyo–Narita, Trang, Ubon Ratchathani, Udon Thani, Vientiane, Wuhan, Xi'an, Yangon
Thai AirAsia X	Almaty, Delhi–Indira Gandhi, Nagoya–Centrair, Osaka–Kansai, Riyadh (suspended), Sapporo–Chitose, Shanghai–Pudong (suspended), Tokyo–Narita
Thai Lion Air	Ahmedabad, Amritsar, Beijing–Daxing, Bengaluru, Changsha, Chengdu–Tianfu, Chennai, Chiang Mai, Chiang Rai, Chongqing, Datong, Delhi–Indira Gandhi, Denpasar, Hangzhou, Hat Yai, Hefei, Ho Chi Minh City, Hong Kong, Huangshan, Jakarta–Soekarno-Hatta, Kaohsiung, Khon Kaen, Kochi, Kolkata, Krabi, Macau, Mumbai–Shivaji, Nagoya–Centrair, Naha, Nakhon Phanom, Nakhon Si Thammarat, Nanchang (suspended), Osaka–Kansai, Penang, Phitsanulok, Phuket, Sapporo–Chitose, Shanghai–Pudong, Shenzhen, Singapore, Surabaya, Surat Thani, Taipei–Taoyuan, Tianjin, Tokyo–Narita, Trang, Ubon Ratchathani, Udon Thani, Xi'an, Zhangjiajie

== Statistics ==
In 2019, the airport reached its full capacity of 52 flights per hour or about 700–800 flights per day. By the end of 2019, it is expected to top its maximum passenger handling capacity of 40 million. Airport manager AoT forecasts 41 million passengers in 2020 and 45 million by 2023. The airport was designed to serve a maximum of 30 million passengers annually. Building additional runways is not possible. AoT is encouraging airlines to use wide-body aircraft at Don Mueang to increase passenger loads from 100–200 passengers to about 300 per aircraft.

=== Passenger figures ===
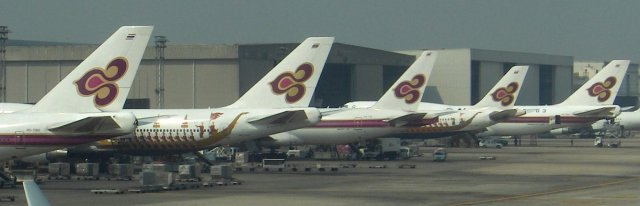
A line-up of Thai Airways International aircraft at Don Muang before their relocation to Suvarnabhumi Airport in 2005

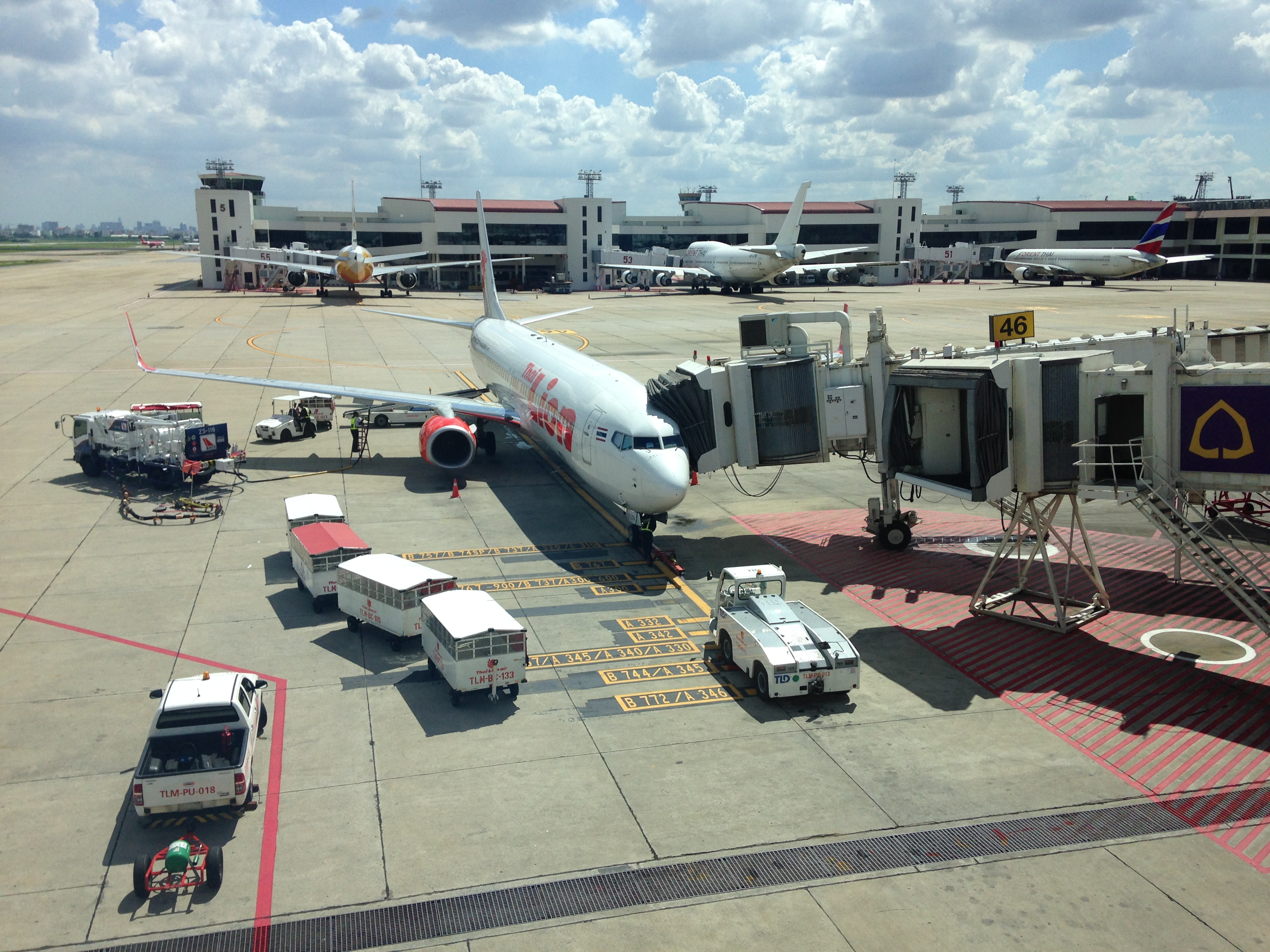
A Thai Lion Air Boeing 737-900ER at gate 46 bound for Hat Yai in 2015

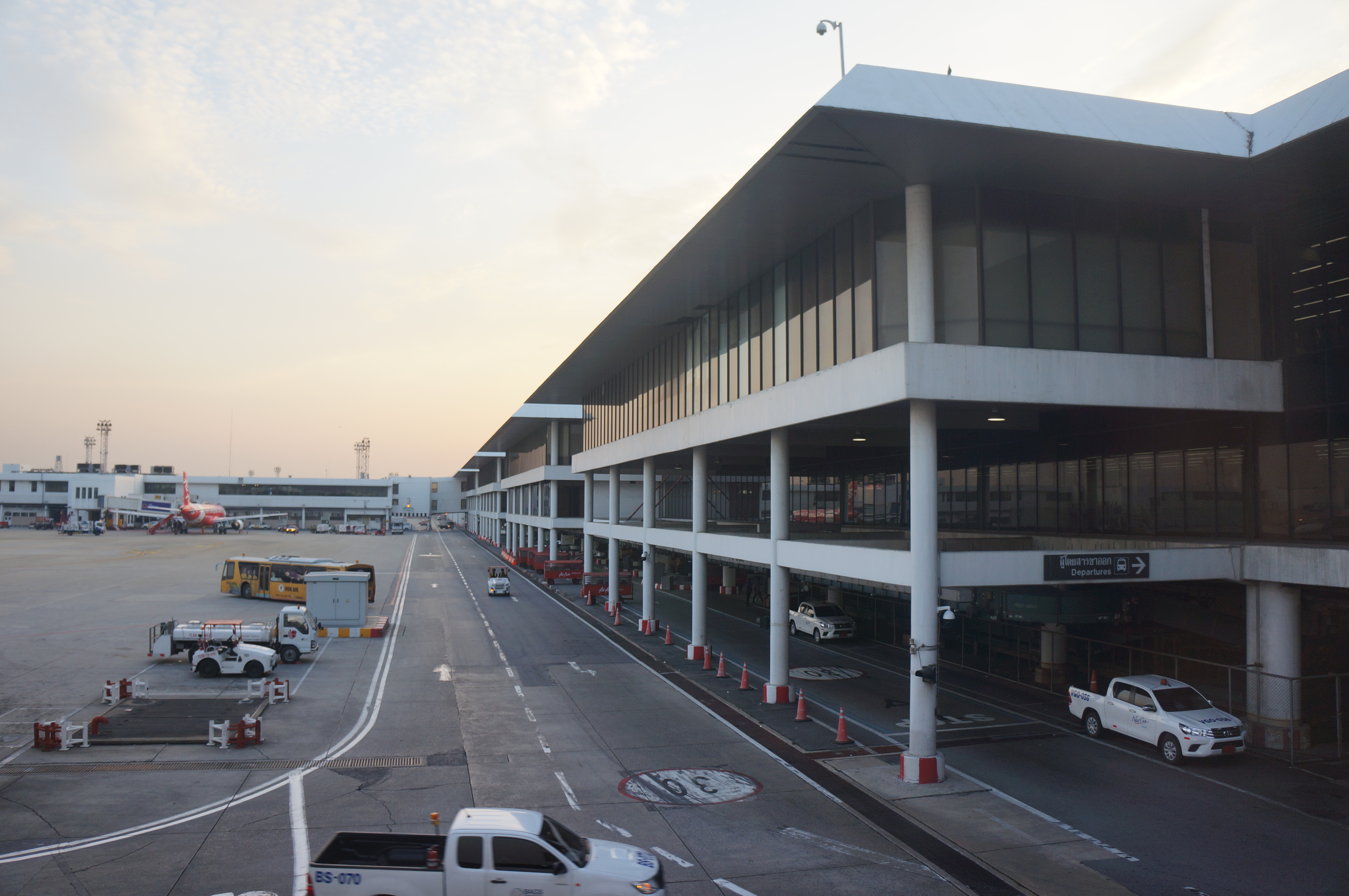
International Terminal (Terminal 1) of Don Mueang International Airport

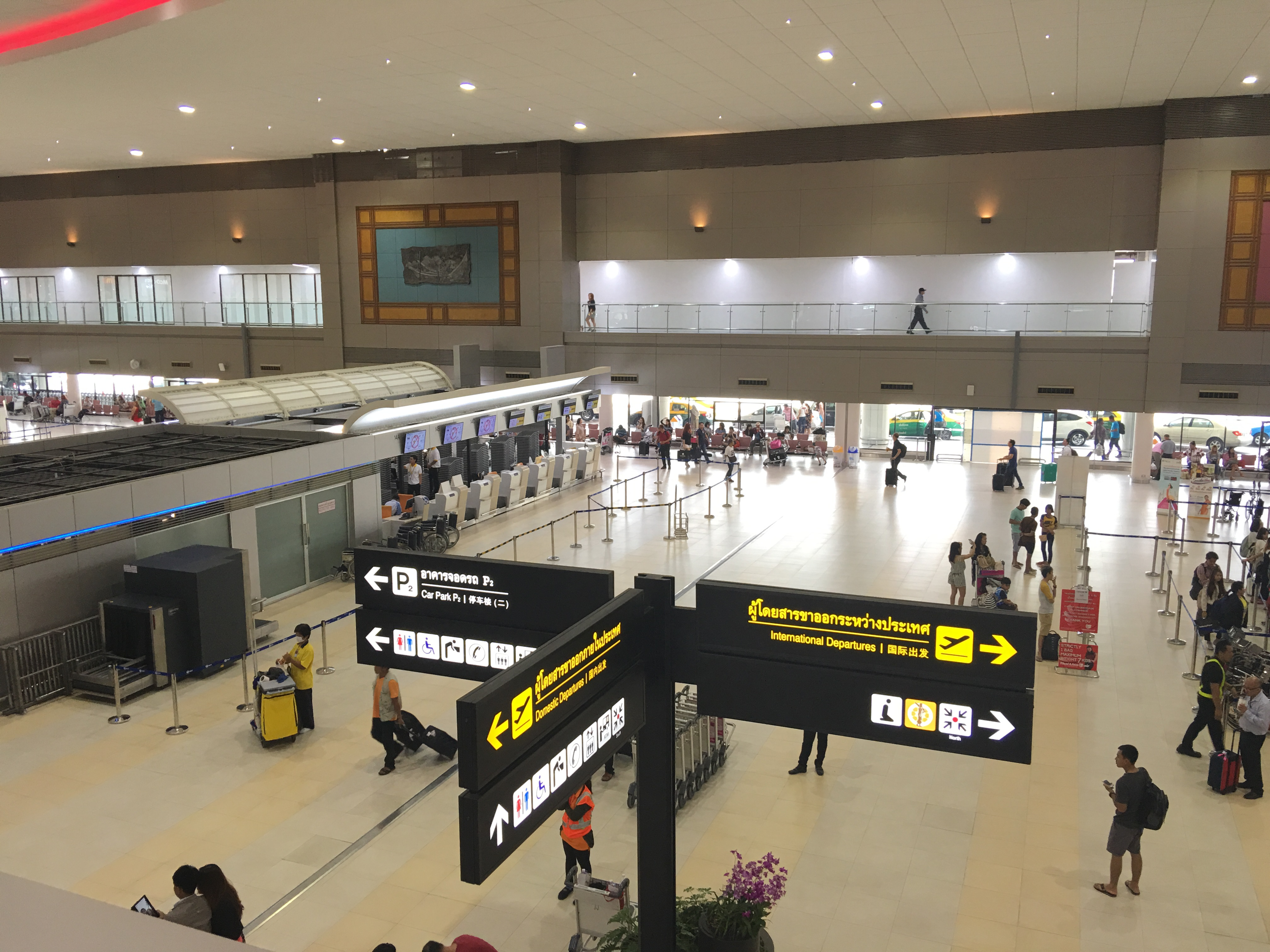
Departure hall of Terminal 2 in Don Mueang International Airport

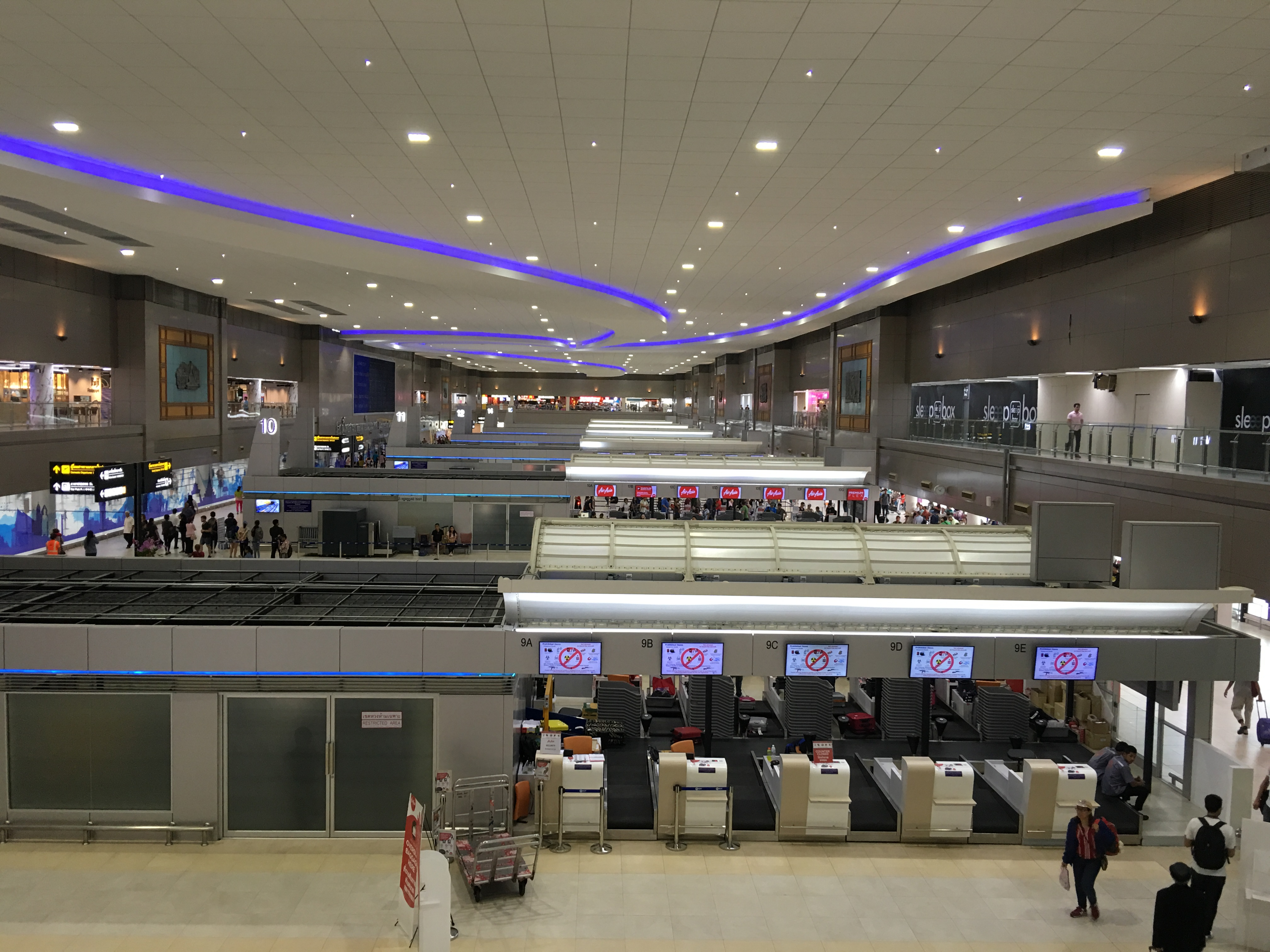
Check-in area of Terminal 2 in 2016

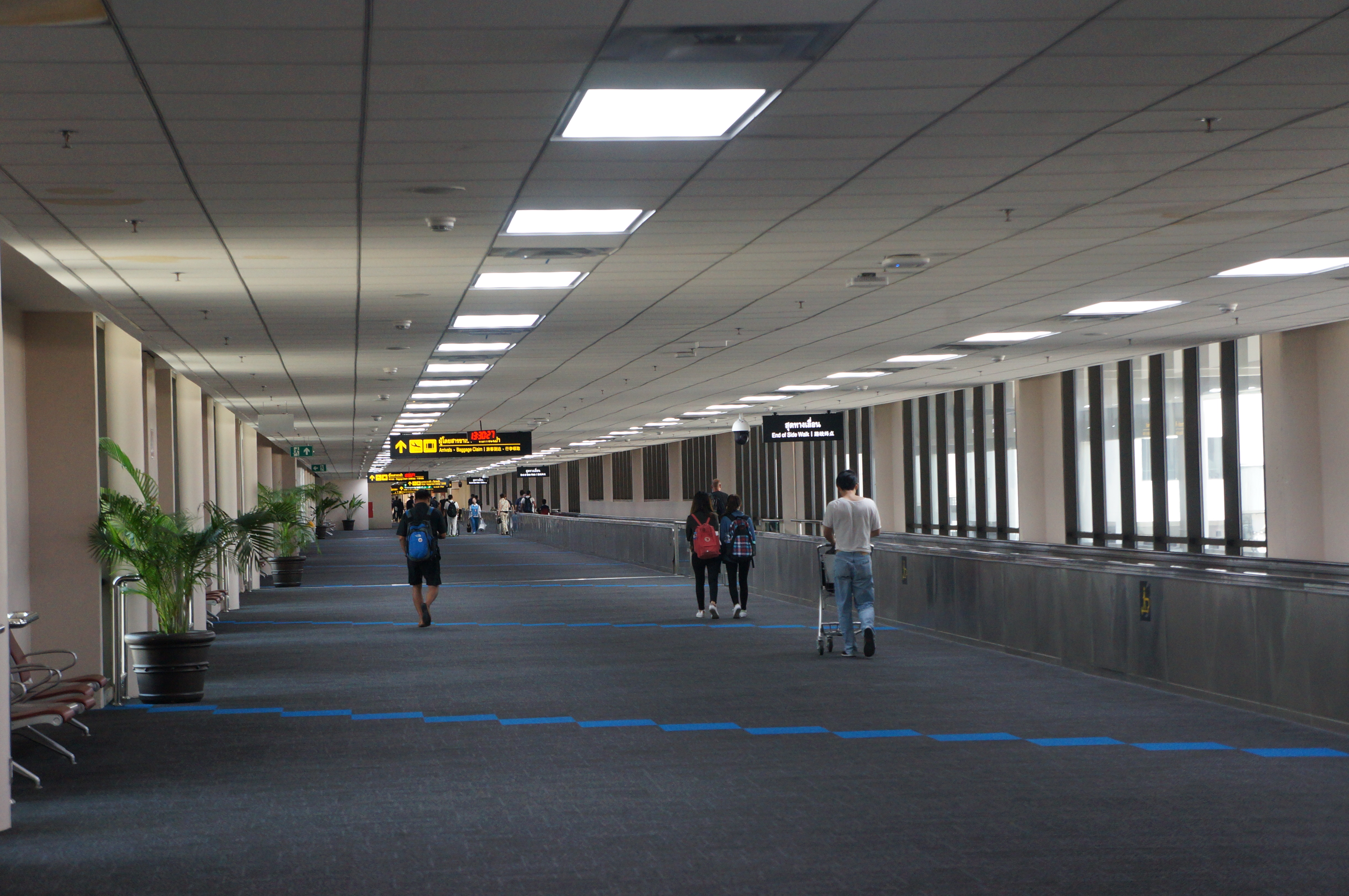
Arrival Corridor in Domestic Arrival Terminal 2

Total passenger traffic through Don Mueang jumped 40.7 percent to 30.3 million in 2015, with international numbers rising 53.1 percent to 9.17 million and domestic passengers increasing 35.9 percent to 21.1 million. Aircraft movements rose by 29.8 percent to 224,074, including 158,804 domestic (up 26.2 percent) and 65,270 international (up 39.3 percent).

Calendar year	Passengers	Change from the previous	Movements	Cargo (tons)
2008	5,043,235	–	–	–
2009	2,466,997	▼51.1%	–	–
2010	2,999,867	▲21.6%	–	–
2011	3,424,915	▲14.2%	51,301	–
2012	5,983,141	▲74.7%	65,120	7,329
2013	16,479,227	▲472.70%	154,827	25,657
2014	21,546,568	▲30.75%	172,681	29,086
2015	30,304,183	▲29.76%	224,074	45,488
2016	35,203,757	▲16.17%	244,296	67,884
2017	38,299,757	▲8.8%	256,760	67,777
2018	40,758,148	▲6.4%	272,361	55,250
2019	41,313,439	▲1.36%	272,363	43,586
2020	15,765,854	▼61.8%	133,307	15,226
2021	5,059,048	▼67.91%	120,683	20,685
2022	16,130,626	▲218.85%	133,307	6,543
2023	26,980,428	▲67.26%	184,542	14,210
2024	30,490,635	▲11.46%	205,681	25,364
2025	31,650,816	▲3.81%	214,723	55,568
Source: Airports of Thailand

Year	Domestic	International	Total	Change %
2008	5,043,235		5,043,235	▲0.46
2009	2,466,997		2,466,997	▼51.1%
2010	2,999,867		2,999,867	▲21.6%
2011	3,424,915		3,424,915	▲14.2%
2012			5,983,141	▲74.7%
2013	11,190,783	5,288,444	16,479,227	▲472.70%
2014	15,556,627	5,989,941	21,546,568	▲30.75%
2015	21,133,502	9,170,681	30,304,183	▲29.76%
2016	23,323,457	11,880,300	35,203,757	▲16.17%
2017	23,942,371	14,357,386	38,299,757	▲8.8%
2018	24,779,256	15,978,892	40,758,148	▲6.4%
2019	23,456,123	17,857,316	41,331,439	▲1.36%
2020	13,039,448	2,726,406	15,765,854	▼61.8%
2021	5,045,193	13,855	5,059,048	▼67.91%
2022	13,524,424	2,606,202	16,130,626	▲218.85%
2023	17,009,418	9,971,010	26,980,428	▲67.26%
2024	17,828,242	12,662,393	30,490,635	▲11.46%
2025	19,407,387	12,243,429	30,490,635	▲3.81%

=== Busiest domestic routes 2019 ===
Busiest domestic routes to and from Don Mueang Airport 2019
Rank	Airport	Passengers Handled 2019	% change
1	Chiang Mai	3,564,487	▲0.34%
2	Phuket	3,016,280	▼9.76%
3	Hat Yai	2,574,739	▼9.27%
4	Udon Thani	1,656,430	▼6.60%
5	Chiang Rai	1,549,745	▼4.20%

=== Busiest international routes ===
Busiest international routes to and from Don Mueang Airport 2019
Rank	Airport	Passengers 2019	% change
1	Kuala Lumpur–International	1,339,182	▼5.47%
2	Tokyo–Narita	1,279,186	▲34.05%
3	Singapore	1,071,336	▼3.86%
4	Yangon	790,496	▼2.35%
5	Osaka–Kansai	662,318	▲46.83%
6	Seoul–Incheon	643,606	▲13.88%
7	Jakarta–Soekarno-Hatta	585,981	▲13.63%
8	Taipei–Taoyuan	551,848	▲25.05%
9	Ho Chi Minh City	510,873	▼8.67%
10	Nanjing	440,051	▲6.00%

== Other facilities ==
- The following companies had head offices on the airport property, before ceasing operations: Siam Air and R Airlines
- Don Mueang International Airport is a joint-use facility, shared with the Royal Thai Air Force's (RTAF) Don Muang Royal Thai Air Force Base, and is the home of the RTAF 1st Air Division, which consists primarily of non-combat aircraft.
- A RTAF golf course is located between the two runways. The course has no separation from the runway, and golfers are held back by a red light whenever planes land.

== Ground transportation ==
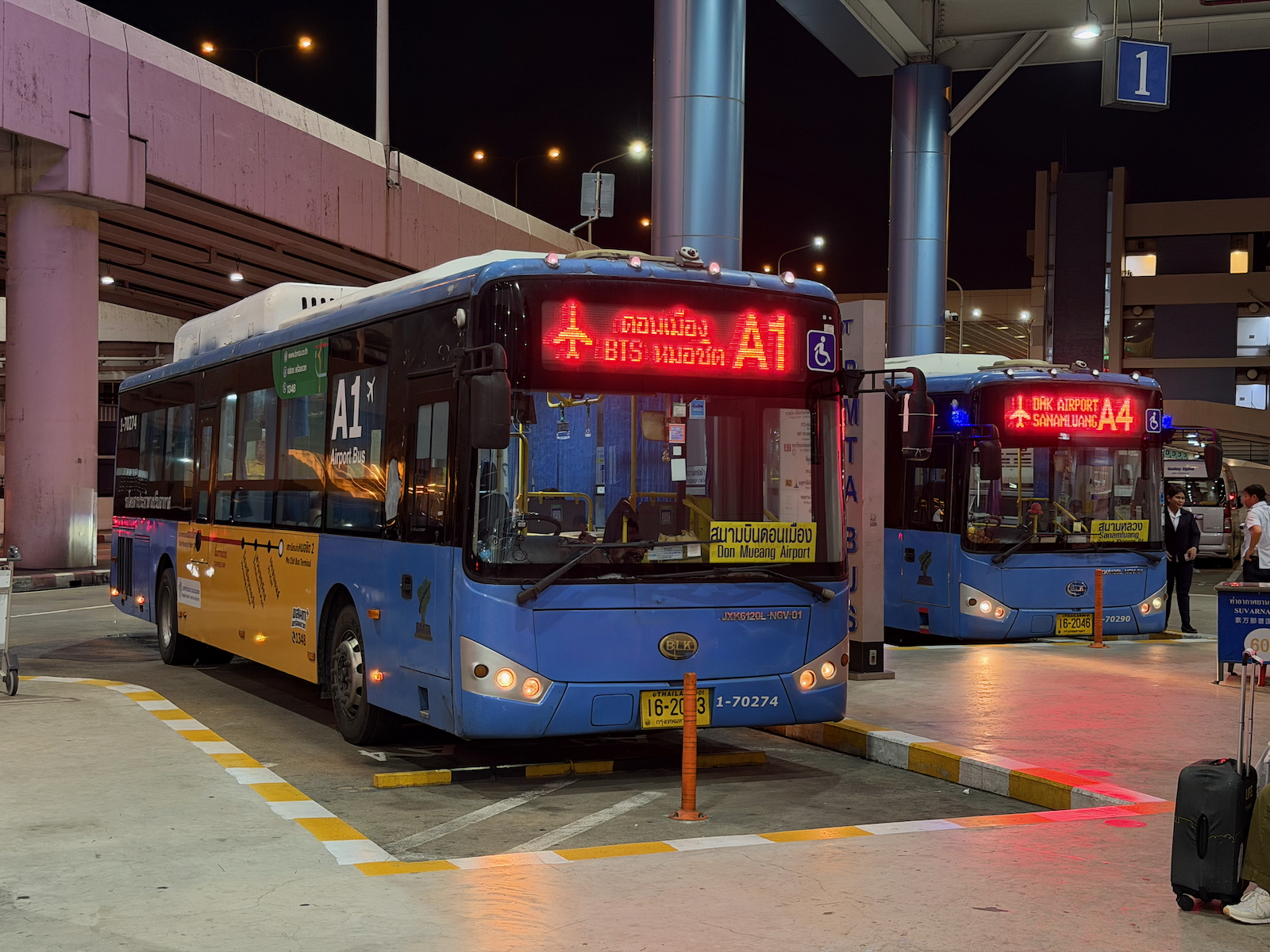
BMTA bus A1-A4 to the city, 2026

=== Bus ===
Passengers arriving at Don Mueang International Airport can take the BMTA Airport Bus A1–A4 to several major destinations in Bangkok. The A1–A4 buses can be boarded at Terminal 1, Level 1, Gate 6 of the International Terminal. The fare is a flat rate for the entire route and is paid in cash on board.

- A1: Don Mueang Airport → BTS Mo Chit → Mo Chit 2 Bus Terminal
- A2: Don Mueang Airport → Victory Monument
- A3: Don Mueang Airport → Pratunam → Central World → Lumpini Park
- A4: Don Mueang Airport → Democracy Monument → Khaosan Road → Sanam Luang

=== Transfer to/from Suvarnabhumi Airport ===
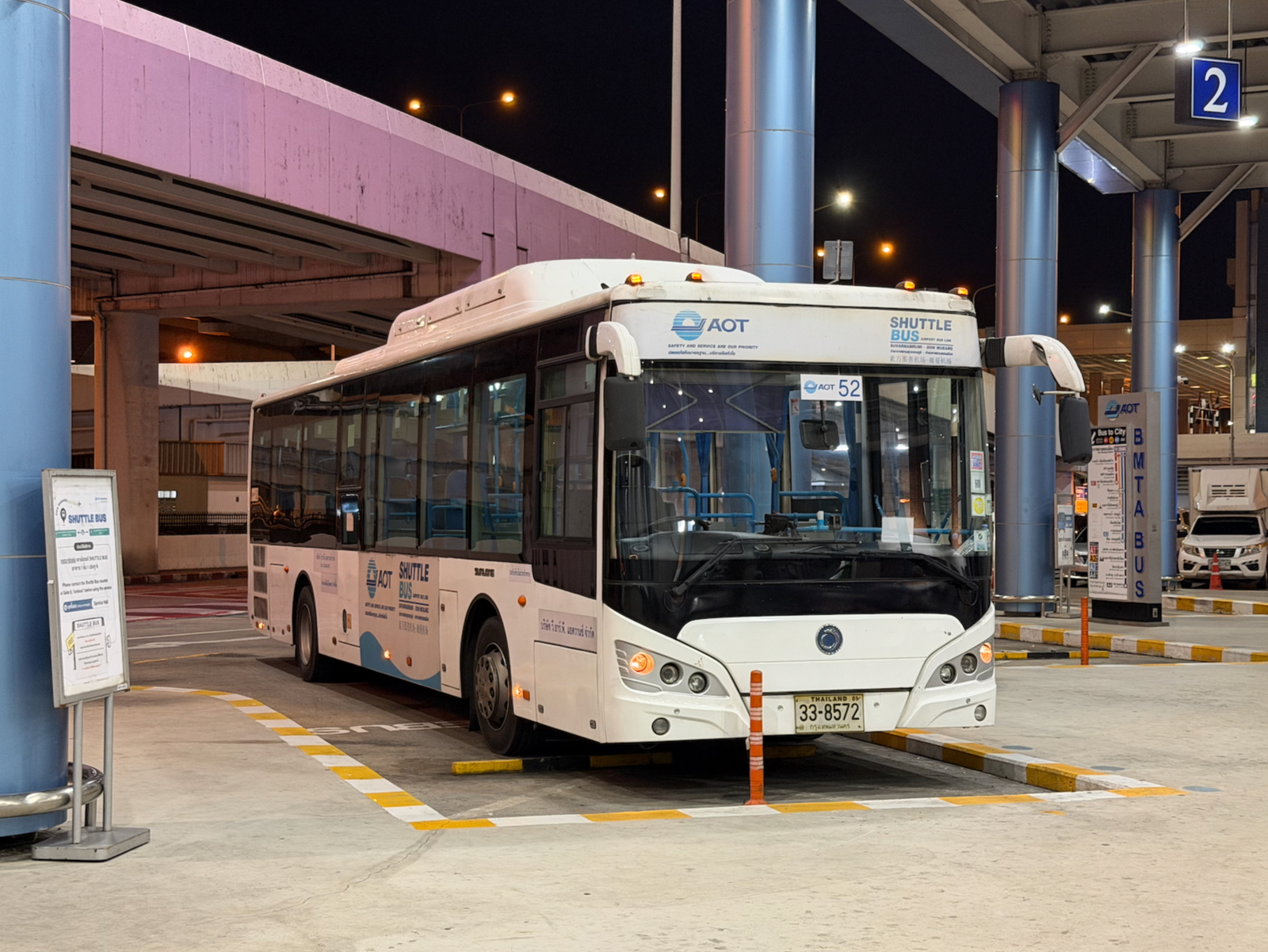
AOT Airport Stuttle Bus (DMK-BKK), 2026

Don Mueang International Airport is approximately 1–1.5 hours from Suvarnabhumi Airport by rail or bus. There are also direct buses between the airports operated by Airport Shuttle Bus.

=== Road ===
The airport has two main access routes. Among these the most convenient route is via the Don Mueang Tollway. Another main airport entrance is Vibhavadi Rangsit Road. The two routes run parallel, one over the other.

Four bus routes service the airport, route A1 runs between the airport and Bangkok Bus Terminal (Chatuchak), route A2 runs between the airport and Victory Monument, route A3 runs between the airport and Lumphini Park, and route A4 runs between the airport and Sanam Luang.

=== Rail ===
Don Mueang station

Don Mueang International Airport is served by the SRT Dark Red Line and the State Railway of Thailand intercity services at Don Mueang railway station that connects to central Bangkok at Krung Thep Aphiwat Central Terminal.

AOT plans to build a three-kilometre monorail to link the airport with the BTS Green Line. Approval of the three billion baht project was expected by the end of 2020.

== Accidents and incidents ==
- 18 March 1938 - Two Royal Siamese Air Force Curtiss F11C Goshawks crashed over Don Mueang Airport in a mid-air collision whilst practicing for an air show.
- 19 October 1945 - A Royal Air Force Douglas C-47 Skytrain registered as FL577 overshot the runway and belly-landed following an engine failure after take-off from the airport.
- 25 December 1976 – EgyptAir Flight 864, a Boeing 707-300 (registered SU-AXA) bound for Bangkok from Cairo, crashed into an industrial area near the airport during a landing attempt. All 53 on board were killed.
- 27 April 1980 – Thai Airways Flight 231, a BAe 748 (registered HS-THB) that was en route from Khon Kaen to Bangkok, lost altitude during a thunderstorm and crashed about 13 kilometres from Bangkok International Airport. All four crew members and 40 of the 49 passengers were killed.
- 1 April 1981 – Indonesian Special Forces (Kopassus) raided hijacked Garuda Indonesia Flight 206 that was en route from Palembang to Polonia Airport (hijacked in Indonesian airspace). All 48 passengers safe, seven fatalities (one commando, one co-pilot, five terrorists). Imran bin Muhammad Zein, hijacker leader, captured.
- 9 September 1988 – Vietnam Airlines Flight 831, a Tupolev Tu-134 (registered VN-A102) crashed while on approach to Don Mueang International Airport. 76 of the 90 passengers and crew on board were killed.
- 26 May 1991 – Lauda Air Flight 004, a Boeing 767-300ER (registered OE-LAV, named Mozart) that was headed to Vienna, suffered an in-flight deployment of the thrust reverser on the No. 1 engine after taking off from Don Mueang. All 223 people on board were killed.
- 21 January 1992 – Douglas VC-47D L2-41/15/210 of the Royal Thai Air Force was damaged beyond repair in a landing accident.
- 23 September 1999 – Qantas Flight 1, a Boeing 747-400 (registered VH-OJH, named City of Darwin) overshot the runway while landing at Don Mueang, causing significant damage but no casualties in what was then the most serious incident in the airline's famously safe jet aircraft history. Despite being a supposed write-off, the 747 was repaired in order to preserve Qantas' no hull-loss record since the Jet Age.
- 3 March 2001 – Thai Airways International Flight 114, a Boeing 737-400 (registered HS-TDC, named Narathiwat), bound for Chiang Mai from Bangkok, was destroyed by an explosion and fire that occurred about 35 minutes before Thaksin Shinawatra, later to become Prime Minister of Thailand, and about 150 other passengers were to board. Five members of the cabin crew were on board, and one was killed. Witnesses said they heard an explosion before flames erupted aboard the aircraft. Subsequently, NTSB investigators reported that the central fuel tank had exploded followed by the right tank 18 minutes later. The cause for the explosion was unclear, though some speculate it was an assassination attempt based on chemicals found during the subsequent investigation.
