= List of the busiest airports in Thailand =

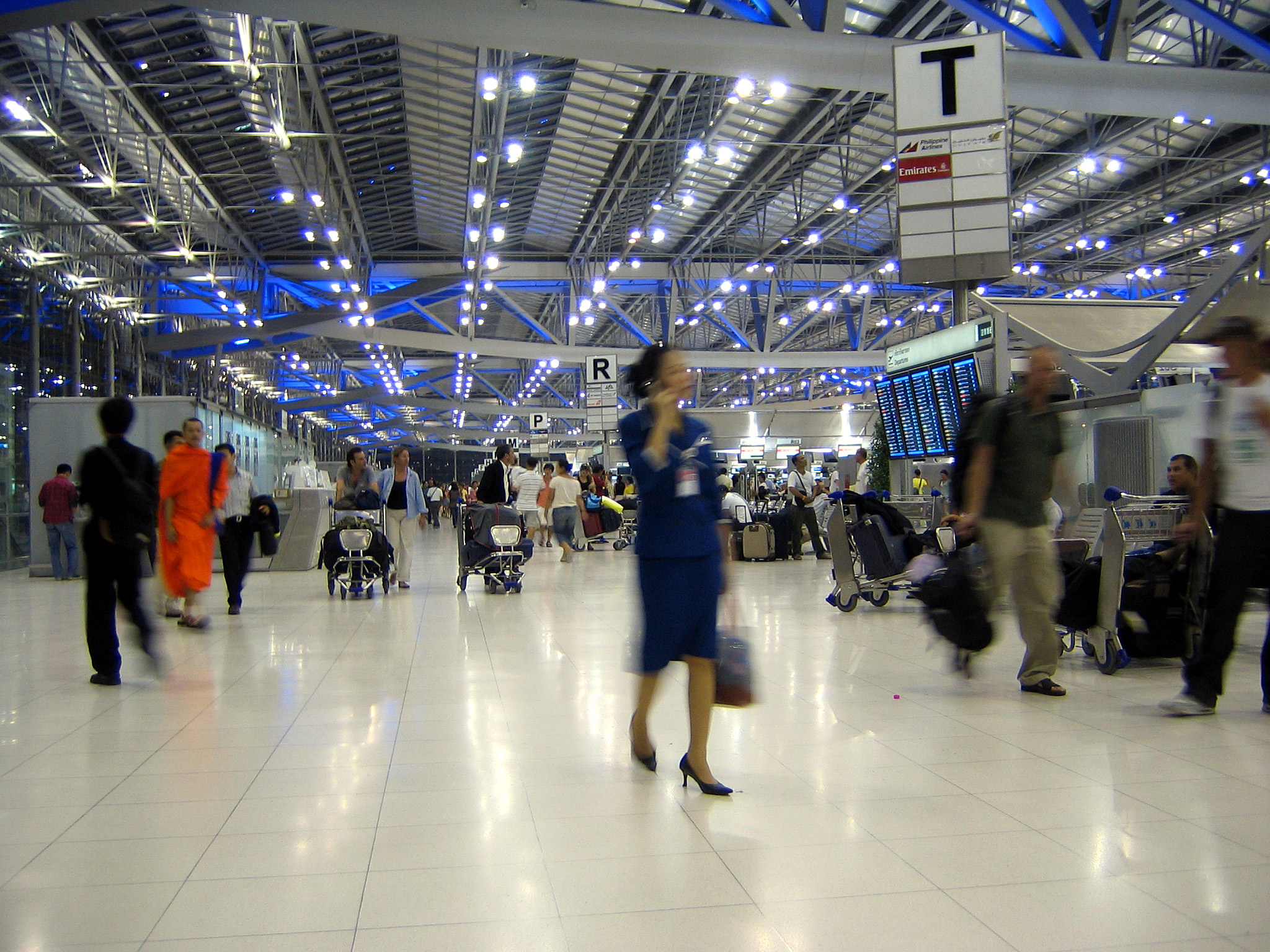
Suvarnabhumi Airport is, as of 2011, the fifth busiest airport in Asia.

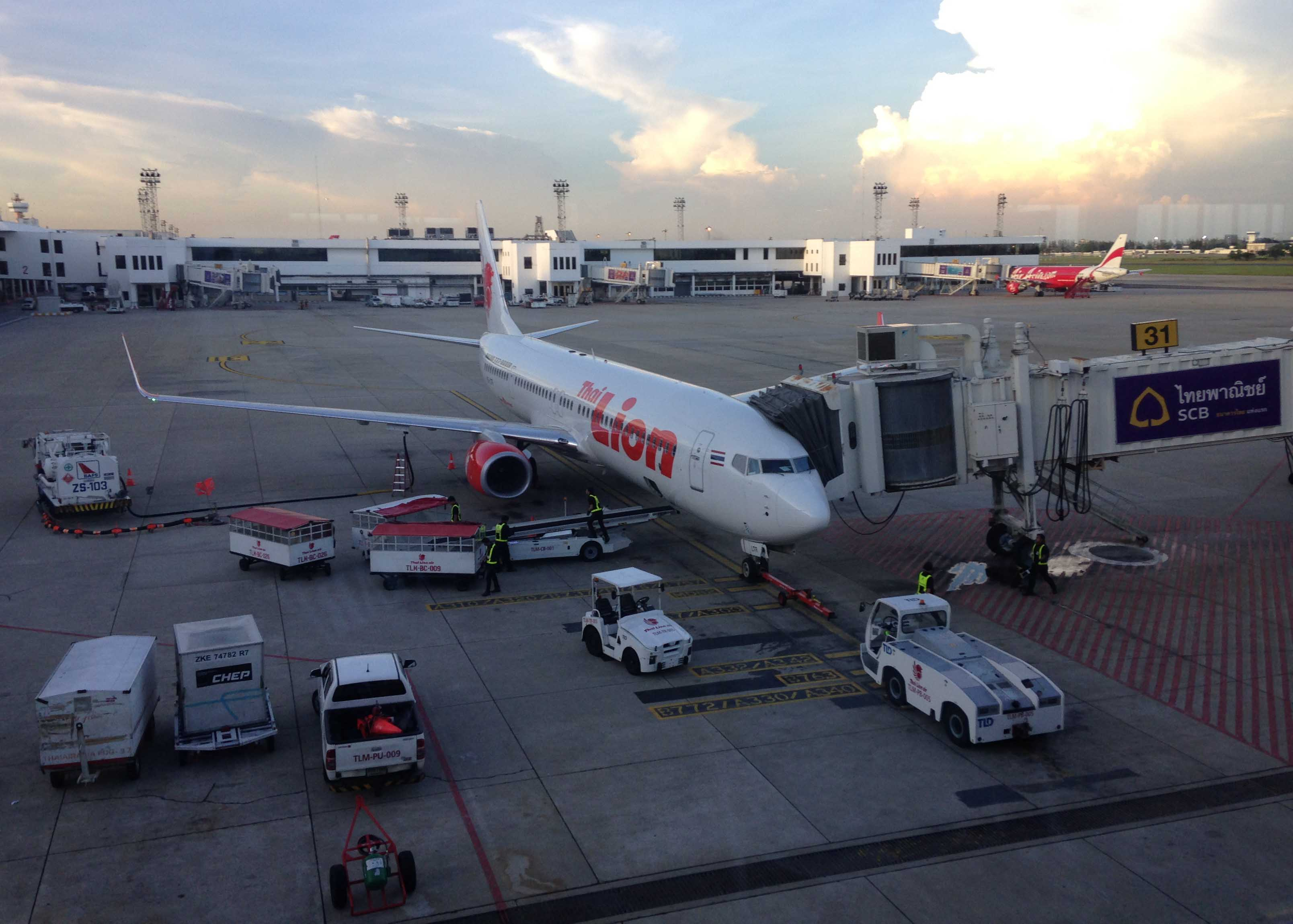
Don Mueang Airport is the country's second busiest airport.

== Statistical sources ==
Thailand has 38 commercial airports.

- Airports of Thailand PLC (AOT) manages Thailand's six international airports and generates their statistics.
1. Suvarnabhumi Airport (BKK)
2. Don Mueang International Airport (DMK)
3. Chiang Mai International Airport (CNX)
4. Phuket International Airport (HKT)
5. Hat Yai International Airport (HDY)
6. Mae Fah Luang-Chiang Rai International Airport (CEI)

AOT reports statistics based on their fiscal year (FY), 1 October–30 September. AOT's FY2014 is 1 Oct 2013–30 Sep 2014.

- Thailand's Department of Airports (DOA) manages 28 regional domestic airports and reports their statistics.
- The Royal Thai Navy manages U-Tapao Rayong-Pattaya International Airport. Statistics are reported by the DOA.
- Bangkok Airways manages three airports: Samui Airport; Sukhothai Airport; and Trat Airport. Statistics are reported by the DOA.

== 2023 Final Traffic results ==
The 25 busiest airports in Thailand in 2023 ordered by total passenger traffic, according to the CAAT statistical reports.

#	Airport name	City Served	IATA/ICAO	Passengers		Aircraft		Freight	
#	Airport name	City Served	IATA/ICAO	2023(total)	% YoY	2023 (movs.)	% YoY	2023 (tonnes)	% YoY
1	Suvarnabhumi Airport	Bangkok	BKK/VTBS	51,666,761	▲80.0	305,677	▲41.2	1,184,260	▼1.0
2	Don Mueang International Airport	Bangkok	DMK/VTBD	26,972,528	▲67.3	181,873	▲54.5	14,208	▲117.3
3	Phuket International Airport	Phuket	HKT/VTSP	13,977,030	▲79.0	87,139	▲52.4	37,211	▲57.5
4	Chiang Mai International Airport	Chiang Mai	CNX/VTCC	8,222,538	▲50.7	55,478	▲42.8	5,153	▼7.4
5	Hat Yai International Airport	Hat Yai	HDY/VTSS	3,106,783	▲5.7	20,033	▼4.3	3,178	▼15.1
6	Krabi International Airport	Krabi	KBV/VTSG	2,320,841	▲63.6	16,674	▲56.7	279	▼3.1
7	Samui Airport	Ko Samui	USM/VTSM	2,294,811	▲66.5	25,021	▲60.6	537	▲39.5
8	Chiang Rai International Airport	Chiang Rai	CEI/VTCT	1,919,563	▲13.8	12,386	▲4.6	874	▼4.9
9	Udon Thani International Airport	Udon Thani	UTH/VTUD	1,899,195	▲6.8	12,951	▲1.6	410	▼22.7
10	Khon Kaen Airport	Khon Kaen	KKC/VTUK	1,612,309	▲17.0	11,184	▲8.4	279	▼3.1
11	Surat Thani International Airport	Surat Thani	URT/VTSB	1,353,256	▲16.0	8,953	▲7.1	655	▼1.2
12	Ubon Ratchathani Airport	Ubon Ratchathani	UBP/VTUU	1,295,943	▲3.9	8,564	▼4.7	314	▼7.6
13	Nakhon Si Thammarat Airport	Nakhon Si Thammarat	NST/VTSF	1,195,539	▼6.8	9,153	▲2.4	384	▲1.9
14	Trang Airport	Trang	TST/VTST	564,488	▲7.0	3,759	▼0.1	184	▼0.8
15	U-Tapao International Airport	Chonburi-Pattaya	UTP/VTBU	444,892	▲318.8	4,964	▲259.4	26	▲229.1
16	Phitsanulok Airport	Phitsanulok	PHS/VTPP	432,263	▲26.6	3,328	▲15.2	16	▼26.7
17	Nan Nakhon Airport	Nan	NNT/VTCN	386,574	▼14.4	2,512	▼31.9	0	N.A.
18	Sakon Nakhon Airport	Sakon Nakhon	SNO/VTUI	361,910	▲17.2	2,396	▲4.7	39	▲76.3
19	Nakhon Phanom Airport	Nakhon Phanom	KOP/VTUW	359,189	▲6.6	2,242	▼3.4	0	N.A.
20	Roi Et Airport	Roi Et	ROI/VTUV	348,798	▲31.1	2,168	▲11.4	0	N.A.
21	Buriram Airport	Buriram-Surin	BFV/VTUO	252,246	▲28.6	2,454	▲20.3	0	N.A.
22	Narathiwat Airport	Narathiwat	NAW/VTSC	224,423	▲16.0	1,480	▲8.0	0	N.A.
23	Loei Airport	Loei	LOE/VTUL	195,189	▲15.9	1,393	▲0.1	1	▼86.2
24	Ranong Airport	Ranong	UNN/VTSR	132,955	▲33.8	995	▲6.6	0	N.A.
25	Chumphon Airport	Chumphon	CJM/VTSE	122,632	▲33.4	854	▼1.5	0	N.A.

== 2022 Final Traffic results ==
The 25 busiest airports in Thailand in 2022 ordered by total passenger traffic, according to the CAAT statistical reports.

#	Airport name	City Served	IATA/ICAO	Passengers		Aircraft		Freight	
#	Airport name	City Served	IATA/ICAO	2022(total)	% YoY	2022 (movs.)	% YoY	2022 (tonnes)	% YoY
1	Suvarnabhumi Airport	Bangkok	BKK/VTBS	28,705,891	▲410.2	216,462	▲99.2	1,195,976	▲6.8
2	Don Mueang International Airport	Bangkok	DMK/VTBD	16,123,830	▲219.3	117,718	▲138.5	6,539	▼68.4
3	Phuket International Airport	Phuket	HKT/VTSP	7,807,051	▲336.9	57,196	▲212.6	20,447	▲70.8
4	Chiang Mai International Airport	Chiang Mai	CNX/VTCC	5,457,942	▲209.8	38,853	▲143.3	5,562	▲71.5
5	Hat Yai International Airport	Hat Yai	HDY/VTSS	2,938,857	▲143.1	20,930	▲107.7	3,743	▲17.3
6	Udon Thani International Airport	Udon Thani	UTH/VTUD	1,777,842	▲169.0	12,748	▲117.8	530	▲27.8
7	Chiang Rai International Airport	Chiang Rai	CEI/VTCT	1,686,118	▲137.4	11,846	▲94.4	919	▲57.1
8	Krabi International Airport	Krabi	KBV/VTSG	1,418,219	▲249.6	10,643	▲178.7	335	▲70.7
9	Khon Kaen Airport	Khon Kaen	KKC/VTUK	1,399,890	▲156.3	10,314	▲123.5	288	▲56.2
10	Samui Airport	Ko Samui	USM/VTSM	1,378,354	▲361.0	15,575	▲223.1	385	▲127.7
11	Nakhon Si Thammarat Airport	Nakhon Si Thammarat	NST/VTSF	1,282,324	▲107.2	8,937	▲59.7	377	▲56.9
12	Ubon Ratchathani Airport	Ubon Ratchathani	UBP/VTUU	1,247,193	▲129.4	8,989	▲87.3	340	▲100.9
13	Surat Thani International Airport	Surat Thani	URT/VTSB	1,166,384	▲160.2	8,358	▲110.8	664	▲63.7
14	Trang Airport	Trang	TST/VTST	527,636	▲138.3	3,762	▲104.6	185	▲36.9
15	Nan Nakhon Airport	Nan	NNT/VTCN	451,826	▲137.5	3,688	▲74.8	1	N.A.
16	Phitsanulok Airport	Phitsanulok	PHS/VTPP	341,479	▲135.8	2,888	▲51.3	21	▲7.2
17	Nakhon Phanom Airport	Nakhon Phanom	KOP/VTUW	336,872	▲248.1	2,322	▲169.4	0	N.A.
18	Sakon Nakhon Airport	Sakon Nakhon	SNO/VTUI	308,713	▲163.1	2,288	▲93.2	22	▲83.9
19	Roi Et Airport	Roi Et	ROI/VTUV	266,021	▲257.6	1,947	▲205.2	0	N.A.
20	Buriram Airport	Buriram-Surin	BFV/VTUO	196,185	▲262.0	2,040	▲75.6	0	N.A.
21	Narathiwat Airport	Narathiwat	NAW/VTSC	193,409	▲151.0	1,370	▲93.0	0	N.A.
22	Loei Airport	Loei	LOE/VTUL	168,422	▲160.3	1,391	▲66.4	5	▲13.0
23	Lampang Airport	Lampang	LPT/VTCL	112,313	▲117.6	2,356	▲78.5	8	▲197.4
24	U-Tapao International Airport	Chonburi-Pattaya	UTP/VTBU	106,236	▲154.4	1,381	▲104.9	0	N.A.
25	Ranong Airport	Ranong	UNN/VTSR	99,354	▲196.8	933	▲78.4	0	N.A.

== 2021 Final Traffic results ==
The 25 busiest airports in Thailand in 2021 ordered by total passenger traffic, according to the CAAT statistical reports.

#	Airport name	City Served	IATA/ICAO	Passengers		Aircraft		Freight	
#	Airport name	City Served	IATA/ICAO	2021(total)	% YoY	2021 (movs.)	% YoY	2021 (tonnes)	% YoY
1	Suvarnabhumi Airport	Bangkok	BKK/VTBS	5,626,748	▼66.3	108,684	▼28.0	1,120,295	▲22.8
2	Don Mueang International Airport	Bangkok	DMK/VTBD	5,050,189	▼68.0	49,357	▼62.4	20,682	▲36.1
3	Phuket International Airport	Phuket	HKT/VTSP	1,786,811	▼67.1	18,299	▼52.6	11,973	▼6.3
4	Chiang Mai International Airport	Chiang Mai	CNX/VTCC	1,761,882	▼63.7	15,966	▼59.4	3,242	▼34.0
5	Hat Yai International Airport	Hat Yai	HDY/VTSS	1,208,742	▼49.0	10,078	▼46.2	3,190	▼32.0
6	Chiang Rai International Airport	Chiang Rai	CEI/VTCT	710,220	▼53.0	6,093	▼49.5	585	▼39.3
7	Udon Thani International Airport	Udon Thani	UTH/VTUD	660,829	▼53.1	5,853	▼53.4	415	▼33.8
8	Nakhon Si Thammarat Airport	Nakhon Si Thammarat	NST/VTSF	618,816	▼52.1	5,597	▼44.8	240	▼52.0
9	Khon Kaen Airport	Khon Kaen	KKC/VTUK	546,141	▼51.4	4,615	▼52.6	184	▼43.9
10	Ubon Ratchathani Airport	Ubon Ratchathani	UBP/VTUU	543,718	▼48.8	4,798	▼44.9	169	▼34.8
11	Surat Thani International Airport	Surat Thani	URT/VTSB	448,271	▼58.8	3,964	▼55.6	405	▼44.4
12	Krabi International Airport	Krabi	KBV/VTSG	405,619	▼69.2	3,819	▼63.7	196	▼51.5
13	Samui Airport	Ko Samui	USM/VTSM	299,014	▼64.2	4,821	▼55.5	169	▼67.2
14	Trang Airport	Trang	TST/VTST	221,431	▼54.6	1,839	▼52.5	135	▼41.1
15	Nan Nakhon Airport	Nan	NNT/VTCN	190,248	▼39.1	2,110	▼18.6	0	N.A.
16	Phitsanulok Airport	Phitsanulok	PHS/VTPP	144,814	▼61.3	1,909	▼50.5	20	▼81.8
17	Sakon Nakhon Airport	Sakon Nakhon	SNO/VTUI	117,354	▼54.6	1,184	▼53.2	12	▼43.5
18	Nakhon Phanom Airport	Nakhon Phanom	KOP/VTUW	96,775	▼56.6	862	▼52.6	0	N.A.
19	Narathiwat Airport	Narathiwat	NAW/VTSC	77,048	▼48.3	710	▼45.8	0	N.A.
20	Roi Et Airport	Roi Et	ROI/VTUV	74,392	▼64.9	638	▼65.8	0	N.A.
21	Loei Airport	Loei	LOE/VTUL	64,694	▼59.1	836	▼51.3	5	▼44.9
22	Buriram Airport	Buriram-Surin	BFV/VTUO	54,197	▼70.2	1,162	▼57.6	0	N.A.
23	Lampang Airport	Lampang	LPT/VTCL	51,611	▼63.1	1,320	▼55.0	3	▼88.6
24	U-Tapao International Airport	Chonburi-Pattaya	UTP/VTBU	41,765	▼92.6	674	▼86.5	0	N.A.
25	Ranong Airport	Ranong	UNN/VTSR	33,478	▼68.7	523	▼61.6	0	N.A.

== 2020 Final Traffic results ==
The 25 busiest airports in Thailand in 2020 ordered by total passenger traffic, according to the CAAT statistical reports.

#	Airport name	City Served	IATA/ICAO	Passengers		Aircraft		Freight	
#	Airport name	City Served	IATA/ICAO	2020(total)	% YoY	2020 (movs.)	% YoY	2020 (tonnes)	% YoY
1	Suvarnabhumi Airport	Bangkok	BKK/VTBS	16,689,133	▼74.5	150,894	▼60.2	912,049	▼32.9
2	Don Mueang International Airport	Bangkok	DMK/VTBD	15,762,578	▼61.8	131,386	▼51.6	15,201	▼65.1
3	Phuket International Airport	Phuket	HKT/VTSP	5,425,285	▼70.0	38,582	▼66.5	12,775	▼77.8
4	Chiang Mai International Airport	Chiang Mai	CNX/VTCC	4,850,696	▼57.2	39,352	▼50.5	4,914	▼60.1
5	Hat Yai International Airport	Hat Yai	HDY/VTSS	2,369,713	▼39.2	18,731	▼27.4	4,694	▼39.8
6	Chiang Rai International Airport	Chiang Rai	CEI/VTCT	1,512,642	▼48.4	12,061	▼40.0	963	▼62.0
7	Udon Thani International Airport	Udon Thani	UTH/VTUD	1,410,395	▼43.8	12,563	▼30.4	626	▼32.9
8	Krabi International Airport	Krabi	KBV/VTSG	1,318,743	▼63.8	10,521	▼57.2	404	▼65.0
9	Nakhon Si Thammarat Airport	Nakhon Si Thammarat	NST/VTSF	1,292,141	▼7.6	10,133	▲17.2	500	▼15.2
10	Khon Kaen Airport	Khon Kaen	KKC/VTUK	1,123,754	▼40.3	9,727	▼30.8	329	▼45.8
11	Surat Thani International Airport	Surat Thani	URT/VTSB	1,087,396	▼41.6	8,923	▼27.2	729	▼12.2
12	Ubon Ratchathani Airport	Ubon Ratchathani	UBP/VTUU	1,062,794	▼40.7	8,702	▼27.6	259	▼54.9
13	Samui Airport	Ko Samui	USM/VTSM	835,849	▼65.4	10,823	▼61.6	516	▼74.7
14	U-Tapao International Airport	Chonburi-Pattaya	UTP/VTBU	564,713	▼65.6	5,008	▼55.5	0	N.A.
15	Trang Airport	Trang	TST/VTST	488,237	▼28.1	3,868	▼11.7	230	▼23.8
16	Phitsanulok Airport	Phitsanulok	PHS/VTPP	374,235	▼45.7	3,854	▼31.9	109	▼27.5
17	Nan Nakhon Airport	Nan	NNT/VTCN	312,581	▼18.2	2,592	▼10.8	0	N.A.
18	Sakon Nakhon Airport	Sakon Nakhon	SNO/VTUI	258,261	▼33.3	2,529	▼11.6	21	▼45.9
19	Nakhon Phanom Airport	Nakhon Phanom	KOP/VTUW	223,215	▼38.2	1,818	▼24.1	0	N.A.
20	Roi Et Airport	Roi Et	ROI/VTUV	212,096	▼44.5	1,867	▼29.5	0	N.A.
21	Buriram Airport	Buriram-Surin	BFV/VTUO	181,939	▼48.8	2,738	▼21.5	0	N.A.
22	Loei Airport	Loei	LOE/VTUL	158,227	▼39.7	1,716	▼27.9	8	▼47.3
23	Narathiwat Airport	Narathiwat	NAW/VTSC	149,049	▼35.4	1,311	▼18.6	0	N.A.
24	Lampang Airport	Lampang	LPT/VTCL	139,974	▼35.5	2,932	▼26.5	25	▼47.7
25	Ranong Airport	Ranong	UNN/VTSR	107,078	▼47.9	1,362	▼38.2	0	N.A.

== Busiest airports 2009-2019 ==
- The busiest airports in Thailand are measured according to data posted by AOT and by the DOA.
- A "passenger" is defined as a person who departs, arrives, or transits through any airport inside Thailand at any point during a reporting year. These data show number of departures, arrivals, and connecting passengers for the years indicated for both domestic and international flights arriving on scheduled and non-scheduled services.

#	Airport name	Location	Provinces served	IATA	ICAO	2019	2018	2017	2016	2015	2014	2013	2012	2011	2010	2009
1	Suvarnabhumi Airport	Bang Phli, Samut Prakan	Samut Prakan, Bangkok	BKK	VTBS	65,425,879	63,378,923	60,860,704	55,892,428	52,902,110	46,423,352	51,363,451	53,002,328	47,910,904	42,784,967	40,500,224
2	Don Mueang International Airport	Don Mueang, Bangkok	Bangkok, Nonthaburi, Pathumthani	DMK	VTBD	41,313,439	40,758,148	38,299,757	35,203,757	30,304,183	21,546,568	16,479,227	5,983,141	3,424,900	2,999,867	2,466,997
3	Phuket International Airport	Thalang, Phuket	Phuket	HKT	VTSP	18,118,440	18,221,764	16,855,637	15,107,185	12,859,356	11,401,498	11,342,491	9,541,552	8,467,860	7,043,783	5,779,918
4	Chiang Mai International Airport	Chiang Mai, Chiang Mai	Chiang Mai, Lamphun	CNX	VTCC	11,333,548	10,989,402	10,230,070	9,446,320	8,365,851	6,630,624	5,463,921	4,491,331	3,880,037	3,178,94	3,062,909
5	Hat Yai International Airport	Khlong Hoi Khong, Songkhla	Songkhla, Pattani	HDY	VTSS	3,898,092	4,256,106	4,367,364	4,004,665	3,639,936	3,147,281	2,552,411	2,127,483	1,869,113	1,505,906	1,389,873
6	Krabi International Airport	Nuea Khlong, Krabi	Krabi	KBV	VTSG	3,651,568	4,193,099	4,339,599	4,079,564	3,689,672	2,692,569	1,668,163	1,189,878	988,977	836,906	844,167
7	Samui International Airport	Ko Samui, Surat Thani	Surat Thani	USM	VTSM			2,631,710	2,554,624	2,051,289	1,990,155	1,968,884	1,861,229	1,483,258	1,416,138	1,413,297
8	Udon Thani International Airport	Udon Thani, Udon Thani	Udon Thani, Nong Khai	UTH	VTUD	2,515,431	2,651,242	2,577,524	2,350,005	2,213,689	1,682,709	1,325,302	1,184,517	1,011,881	816,602	722,587
9	Chiang Rai International Airport	Chiang Rai, Chiang Rai	Chiang Rai, Phayao	CEI	VTCT	2,928,733	2,867,289	2,503,375	2,038,389	1,745,568	1,379,022	1,089,202	986,436	818,163	726,127	718,536
10	Surat Thani International Airport	Phunphin, Surat Thani	Surat Thani	URT	VTSB	1,867,213	2,108,289	2,247,344	2,032,042	1,856,315	1,319,660	1,080,508	816,484	595,184	505,776	394,096
11	U-Tapao International Airport	Ban Chang, Rayong	Rayong, Chonburi	UTP	VTBU		1,860,786	1,408,258	710,000	177,120	139,728	127,218	152,860	xxx,xxx	118,826	100,431
12	Ubon Ratchathani Airport	Ubon Ratchathani, Ubon Ratchathani	Ubon Ratchathani	UBP	VTUU	1,791,515	1,832,340	1,791,828	1,726,061	1,467,256	1,076,957	835,688	733,718	614,686	453,082	393,451
13	Khon Kaen Airport	Khon Kaen, Khon Kaen	Khon Kaen, Maha Sarakham, Kalasin	KKC	VTUK	1,883,383	1,819,013	1,703,209	1,499,562	1,280,185	947,867	592,252	523,340	456,119	391,421	397,645
14	Nakhon Si Thammarat Airport	Nakhon Si Thammarat, Nakhon Si Thammarat	Nakhon Si Thammarat	NST	VTSF	1,453,200	1,490,773	1,496,218	1,503,463	1,243,179	974,347	950,133	725,858	654,956	406,792	297,257
15	Trang Airport	Trang, Trang	Trang	TST	VTST	679,298	691,270	799,279	648,979	612,629	529,228	504,476	374,798	253,077	202,422	143,560
16	Phitsanulok Airport	Phitsanulok, Phitsanulok	Phitsanulok, Sukhothai, Uttaradit	PHS	VTPP	701,148	672,084	600,093	492,117	549,951	456,535	242,293	214,698	205,056	148,227	142,591
17	Nakhon Phanom Airport	Nakhon Phanom, Nakhon Phanom	Nakhon Phanom	KOP	VTUW	369,418	434,128	419,311	372,026	298,013	220,060	197,315	143,775	33,107	27,530	32,553
18	Roi Et Airport	Thawat Buri, Roi Et	Roi Et, Maha Sarakham	ROI	VTUV	383,341	431,785	395,601	334,955	284,667	69,930	60,588	38,501	15,798	629	11,719
19	Nan Nakhon Airport	Nan, Nan	Nan	NNT	VTCN	382,324	428,202	349,956	376,420	349,264	113,849	82,101	59,519	33,885	9,136	11,379
20	Sakon Nakhon Airport	Sakon Nakhon, Sakon Nakhon	Sakon Nakhon	SNO	VTUI	386,773	382,962	378,057	347,351	425,453	199,492	109,285	97,422	39,536	23,638	25,854
21	Buriram Airport	Satuek, Buriram	Buriram, Surin	BFV	VTUO	355,497	340,692	220,856	197,988	117,710	17,431	11,393	4,575	8,207	7,410	7,181
22	Lampang Airport	Lampang District, Lampang	Lampang	LPT	VTCL	251,852	268,638	280,062	290,420	261,428	120,520	77,905	55,958	22,343	18,574	28,625
23	Loei Airport	Loei, Loei	Loei	LOE	VTUL	263,366	262,906	270,284	261,274	234,419	55,204	41,894	22,451	10,304	884	-
24	Narathiwat Airport	Narathiwat, Narathiwat	Narathiwat	NAW	VTSC	230,701	216,856	258,864	241,721	162,413	111,328	111,891	104,612	116,478	105,152	79,802
25	Ranong Airport	Ranong, Ranong	Ranong	UNN	VTSR	205,183	214,250	121,484	102,228	90,206	59,706	30,004	7,397	3,185	1,453	10,579
26	Mae Sot Airport	Mae Sot, Tak	Tak, Myawaddy	MAQ	VTPM	197,132	193,329	180,094	174,612	144,598	96,330	87,454	34,212	12,854	1,853	1,827
27	Trat Airport	Laem Ngop, Trat	Trat	TDX	VTBO			95,406	92,107	80,981	81,246	68,866	61,739	81,756	76,077	67,326
28	Chumphon Airport	Pathio, Chumphon	Chumphon	CJM	VTSE	192,162	163,815	87,689	93,567	93,325	48,766	45,542	11,059	5,366	0	28
29	Phrae Airport	Phrae, Phrae	Phrae	PRH	VTCP	70,069	88,971	80,961	72,274	48,673	23,371	13,690	9,056	3,494	470	-
30	Sukhothai Airport	Sawankhalok, Sukhothai	Sukhothai	THS	VTPO			76,680	74,xxx	57,026	50,355	50,880	46,218	46,270	39,949	38,905
31	Mae Hong Son Airport	Mae Hong Son, Mae Hong Son	Mae Hong Son	HGN	VTCH	54,813	63,328	61,327	55,368	39,740	34,269	54,983	56,618	55,213	53,466	76,211
32	Hua Hin International Airport	Hua Hin, Prachuap Khiri Khan	Prachuap Khiri Khan, Phetchaburi	HHQ	VTPH	88,594	34,779	2,780	12,076	11,437	10,559	9,900	764	0	92	1,266
33	Nakhon Ratchasima Airport	Chaloem Phra Kiat, Nakhon Ratchasima	Nakhon Ratchasima	NAK	VTUQ	39	10,671	6,975	89	3,155	-	9	186	552	949	0
34	Pai Airport	Pai, Mae Hong Son	Mae Hong Son, Mong Hsat	PYY	VTCI	1,032	1,779	2,110	6,046	5,481	4,289	3,913	3,883	5,014	8,961	9,979
35	Phetchabun Airport	Lom Sak, Phetchabun	Phetchabun	PHY	VTPB		1,082	0	0	76	-	7	16	105	0	0

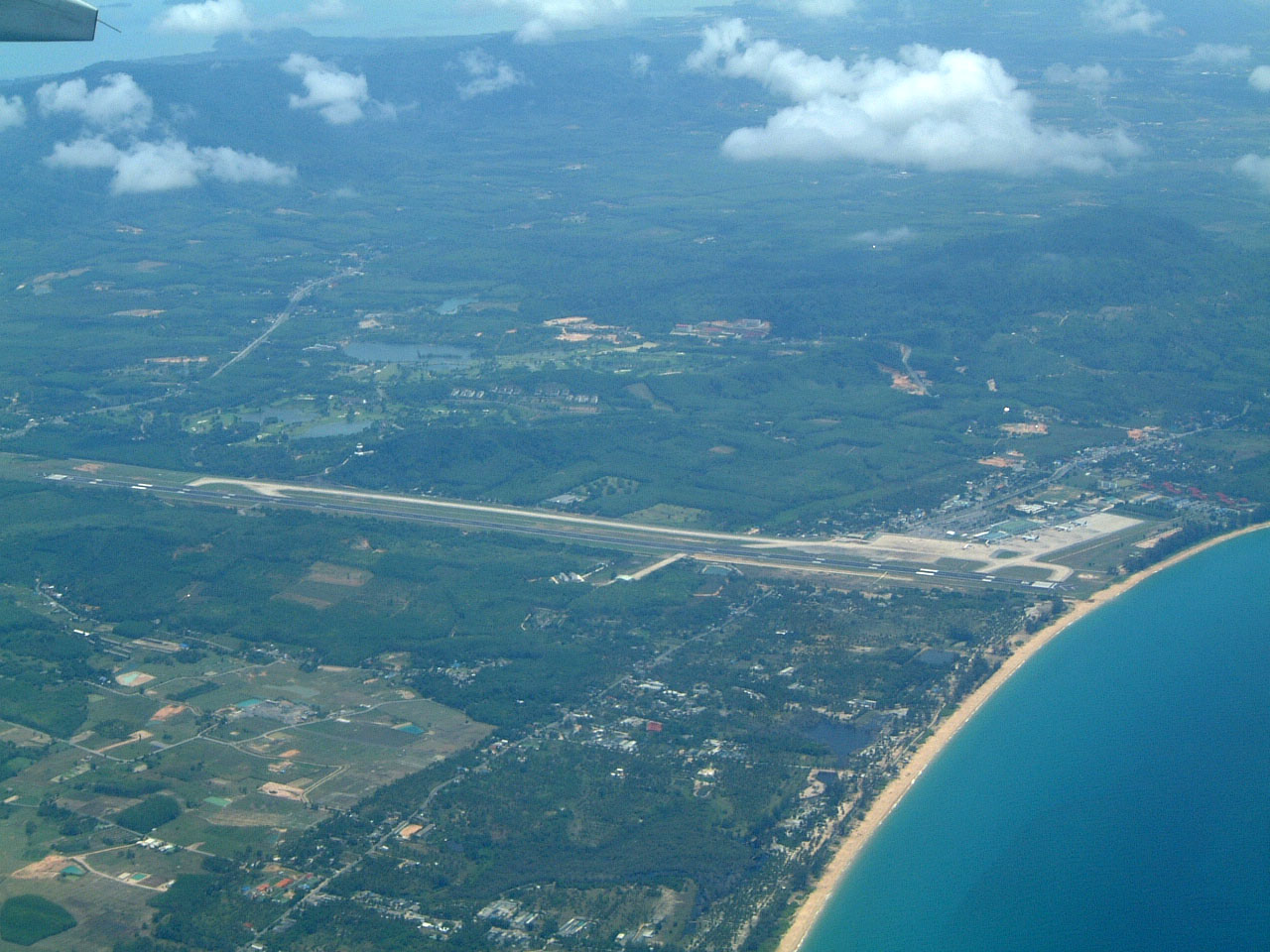
Phuket Airport is the country's third busiest airport.

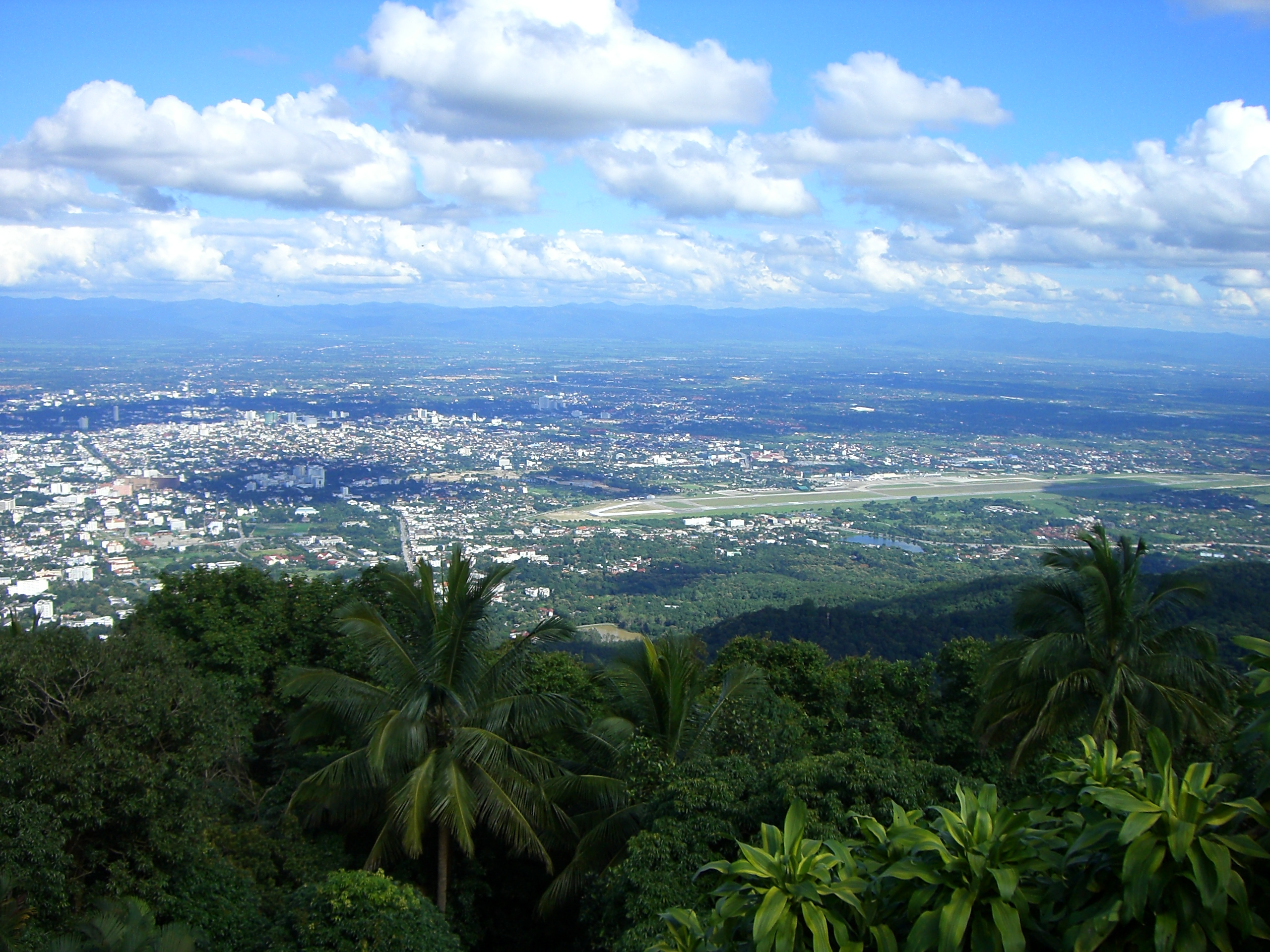
Chiang Mai International Airport, the country's fourth busiest airport

- Notes: Capacity refers to current design passenger capacity without taking into consideration any unfinished or planned expansion projects or changes to operational hours. Despite recent expansions at several airports, a number of them are still operating beyond capacity, further expansions are likely to continue.
