= SGA Airlines =

Commuter airline of Thailand (2001–2014)

SGA
IATA	ICAO	Call sign
5E	SGN	SIAM
- Founded: February 6, 2001
- Commenced operations: October 2002
- Ceased operations: March 30, 2014
- Hubs: Don Mueang International Airport
- Parent company: Siam General Aviation Co., Ltd.
- Headquarters: Bangkok, Thailand
- Key people: Jain Charnnarong (President)

Siam General Aviation Company Limited (Thai: บริษัท สยาม เจนเนอรัล เอวิเอชั่น จำกัด) was an airline in Thailand. Previously operated as an arm for Nok Air under the brand Nok Mini, the company ended their partnership in March 2014. SGA were in talks to be acquired by Thai AirAsia but this fell through and the airline is no longer operating.

== History ==
Siam General Aviation Co., Ltd., based in Bangkok. Its president is Jain Charnnarong. It started operations in October 2002. The company also is an authorised service center for Cessna aircraft in Thailand. In November 2004, it launched daily Bangkok-Hua Hin flights.

The company started accepting Internet bookings in 2005, and in 2006 it received an Airline Operation Certificate and commenced flight operation as a scheduled airline. In February 2007, it started services from a second hub at Chiang Mai International Airport (ex-primary hub), servicing routes to Pai and Nan.

In 2014, SGA terminated their partnership with Nok Air, effective March 30 of the same year. Its president Jain Charnnarong is stepping down citing health concerns, and talks for a Thai AirAsia acquisition failed. Some of the 7 routes previously served under Nok Mini brand are being picked up by Nok Air, operating with their fleet of ATR 72-500 and Boeing 737-800.

== Destinations ==
During its existence, SGA flew to the following destinations:

Thailand

- Bangkok — Don Mueang International Airport (Hub)
- Buri Ram — Buri Ram Airport
- Chiang Mai — Chiang Mai International Airport
- Hua Hin — Hua Hin Airport
- Loei — Loei Airport
- Mae Hong Son — Mae Hong Son Airport
- Mae Sot — Mae Sot Airport
- Nan — Nan Nakhon Airport
- Phrae — Phrae Airport
- Ranong — Ranong Airport
- Roi Et — Roi Et Airport
- Udon Thani — Udon Thani International Airport

Myanmar

- Mawlamyine — Mawlamyine Airport
- Yangon — Yangon International Airport

== Fleet ==
All fleet were disposed or sold by June 2014
