= Khon Kaen (disambiguation) =

Khon Kaen may refer to

- the town Khon Kaen
- Khon Kaen, Mueang Roi Et a sub-District (tambon) of Mueang Roi Et District, Roi Et Province, Thailand
- Khon Kaen Province
- Mueang Khon Kaen district
- Khon Kaen University
- Khon Kaen Airport
