= Narathiwat (disambiguation) =

Narathiwat is a town in southern Thailand.

Narathiwat can also refer to:

- Narathiwat Province
- Amphoe Mueang Narathiwat, the district around Narathiwat town
- Narathiwat Airport
