= Nan Nakhon Airport =

Airport in northern Thailand

Nan Nakhon Airport ท่าอากาศยานน่านนคร
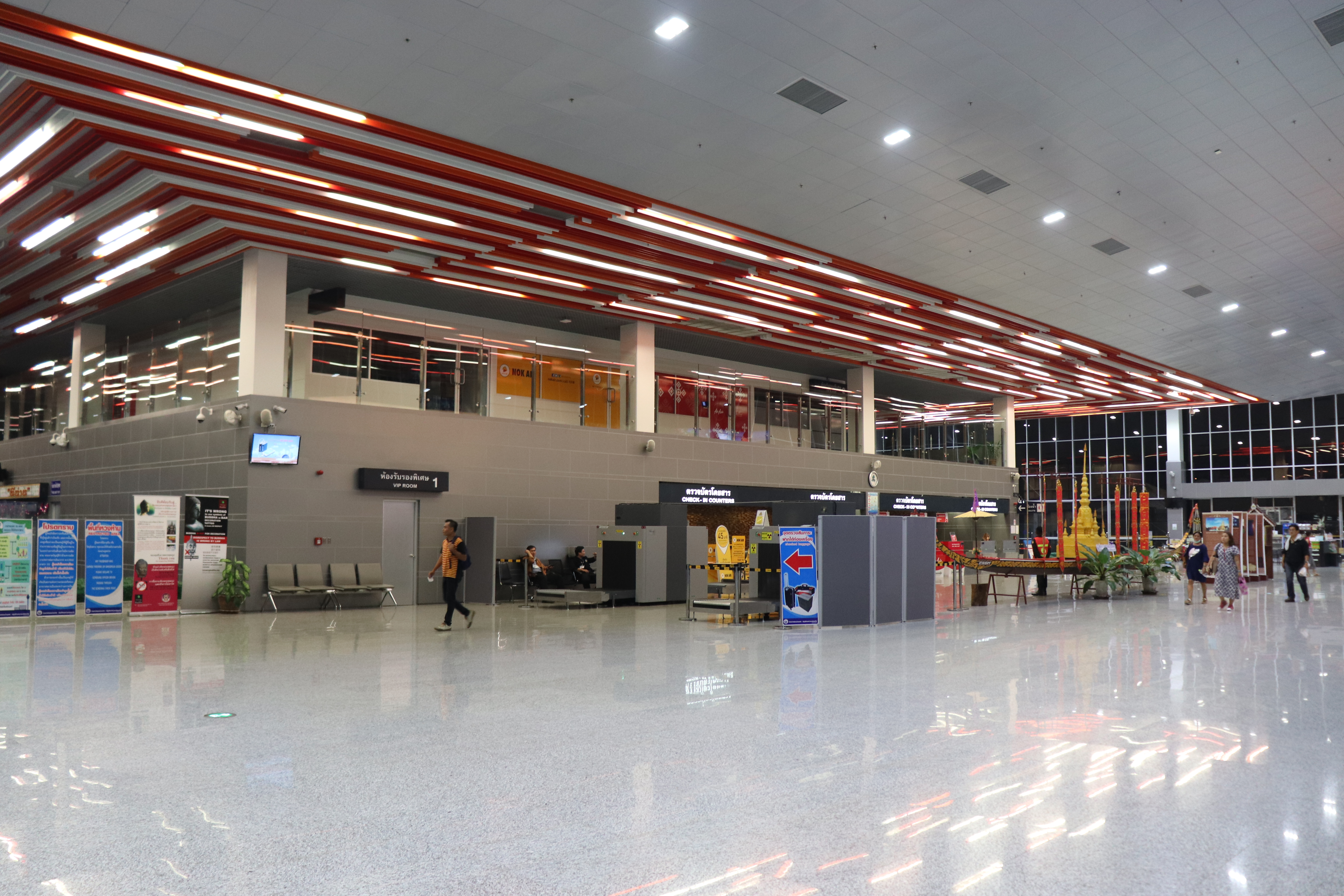
- IATA: NNT; ICAO: VTCN

Summary
- Airport type: Public
- Operator: Department of Airports
- Serves: Nan
- Location: Tambon Pha Sing, Amphoe Mueang Nan, Nan, Thailand
- Opened: 1980; 46 years ago
- Elevation AMSL: 209 m / 685 ft
- Coordinates: 18°48′28″N 100°47′00″E
- Website: minisite.airports.go.th/nannakhon

Maps
- Location of airport in Thailand
- Interactive map of Nan Nakhon Airport

Runways
Direction	Length		Surface
Direction	m	ft	Surface
02/20	2,000	6,562	Asphalt

Statistics (2025)
- Passengers: 421,002 ▲5.32%
- Aircraft movements: 2,824 ▲15.52%
- Freight (tonnes): 4.00 ▲5,900%
- Source: DAFIF

Nan Nakhon Airport (IATA: NNT, ICAO: VTCN) is in Tambon Pha Sing, Amphoe Mueang Nan, Nan province in Northern Thailand. Flights are only offered to Bangkok (DMK).

In 2014, a new terminal was built further down the airport road replacing the old terminal, but using the existing runway. Upon arrival and departure, passengers are required to walk to the terminal or the plane, as there are no jet bridges.

== Naming ==
On 15 February 2015, Princess Maha Chakri Sirindhorn went to the opening ceremony of the new terminal. During this occasion, she gave the name of "Nan Nakhon Airport" which means "the airport of Nan province".

== Airlines and destinations ==
Airlines	Destinations
Nok Air	Bangkok–Don Mueang
Thai AirAsia	Bangkok–Don Mueang

=== Previously served airlines ===
Airlines	Destinations	Years served
Thai Airways Company	Bangkok–Don Mueang	1980-1988
Thai Airways International	Bangkok–Don Mueang	1988-2002
Thai Airways International	Phrae	1988-2002
Thai Airways International	Chiang Mai	1988-2002
Thai Airways International	Phitsanulok	1988-2002
Thai Airways Company	Luang Prabang	2001-2002
Air Andaman	Bangkok–Don Mueang	2002-2006
PBair	Bangkok–Suvarnabhumi	2006-2009
Nok Mini	Chiang Mai	2009-2011
Solar Air	Bangkok–Don Mueang	2010-2011
Happy Air	Bangkok–Suvarnabhumi	2010-2012
Kan Air	Chiang Mai	2013-2017
Wisdom Airways	Chiang Mai	2018-2019
Thai Smile	Bangkok–Suvarnabhumi	
Thai Lion Air	Bangkok–Don Mueang	

== Statistics ==
=== Traffic by calendar year ===
Traffic by calendar year
Year	Passengers	Change from previous year	Movements	Cargo (tons)
2001	31,815		1,540	97.67
2002	18,968	▼40.38%	1,050	58.93
2003	15,234	▼19.69%	794	39.85
2004	12,005	▼21.20%	421	6.86
2005	14,336	▲19.42%	464	5.68
2006	12,935	▼9.77%	493	4.57
2007	12,668	▼2.06%	438	2.53
2008	12,276	▼3.0%	406	0.86
2009	11,379	▼7.3%	409	0.32
2010	9,038	▼20.57%	1,240	0.002
2011	33,885	▲374.92%	1,864	0.00
2012	58,536	▲72.75%	2,341	0.00
2013	82,079	▲40.22%	1,942	8.39
2014	113,849	▲38.70%	2,000	16.17
2015	349,264	▲306.78%	4,036	21.95
2016	376,620	▲7.83%	4,123	52.81
2017	349,986	▼7.07%	3,816	28.94
2018	428,202	▲22.35%	3,976	0.00
2019	382,324	▼10.71%	2,890	0.49
2020	312,574	▼18.24%	2,592	0.00
2021	190,827	▼18.24%	2,111	0.00
2022	451,801	▲18.24%	3,676	0.00
2023	386,575	▲18.24%	2,512	0.00
2024	407,145	▲5.32%	2,768	0.00
2025	421,002	▲5.32%	2,824	0.00
