= Trang Airport =

Airport in southern Thailand

Trang International Airport ท่าอากาศยานนานาชาติตรัง
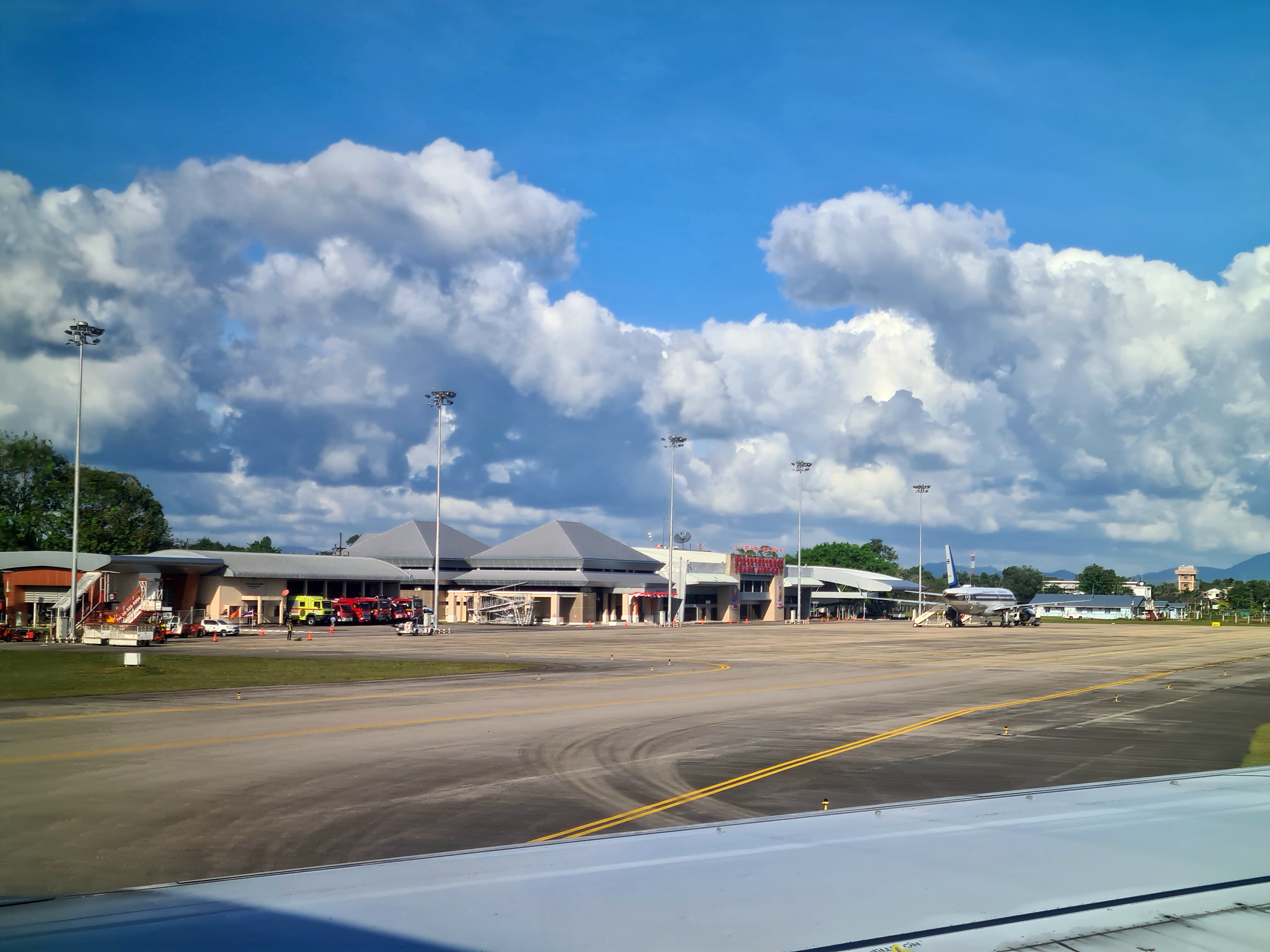
- IATA: TST; ICAO: VTST

Summary
- Airport type: Public
- Operator: Department of Airports
- Serves: Trang
- Location: Tambon Khok Lo, Amphoe Mueang Trang, Trang, Thailand
- Opened: 13 December 1954; 71 years ago
- Elevation AMSL: 20 m / 67 ft
- Coordinates: 07°30′31.48″N 099°36′59.68″E
- Website: minisite.airports.go.th/trang

Maps
- Location of airport in Thailand
- Interactive map of Trang International Airport

Runways
Direction	Length		Surface
Direction	m	ft	Surface
08/26	2,100	6,890	Asphalt (tarmac)

Statistics (2024)
- Passengers: 559,844 ▼0.81%
- Aircraft movements: 3,756 ▲1.78%
- Freight (tonnes): 152.77 ▼16.97%
- Sources: Department of Airports

Trang International Airport (IATA: TST, ICAO: VTST) is in Tambon Khok Lo, Amphoe Mueang Trang, Trang province in Southern Thailand. It is located 7 kilometres (4.3 mi) from downtown Trang.

== Major expansion ==
Despite being solely domestic, passenger numbers surged from 143 to almost 800 thousand from 2009 to 2017. It was planned to expand the terminal to 9,000 sq m. by mid-2019. The runway is planned to extend to 2,990 meters pending environmental review. A second passenger terminal was planned to be built by 2021, pushing capacity to 3.7 million a year.

The new domestic terminal opened on September 5, 2025, after almost five years of delays. The runway extension is now expected to be complete in 2028.

== Airlines and destinations ==
Airlines	Destinations
Nok Air	Bangkok–Don Mueang
Thai AirAsia	Bangkok–Don Mueang
Thai Lion Air	Bangkok–Don Mueang
