= Ubon Ratchathani Airport =

Airport in northeastern Thailand

Ubon Ratchathani Airport ท่าอากาศยานอุบลราชธานี
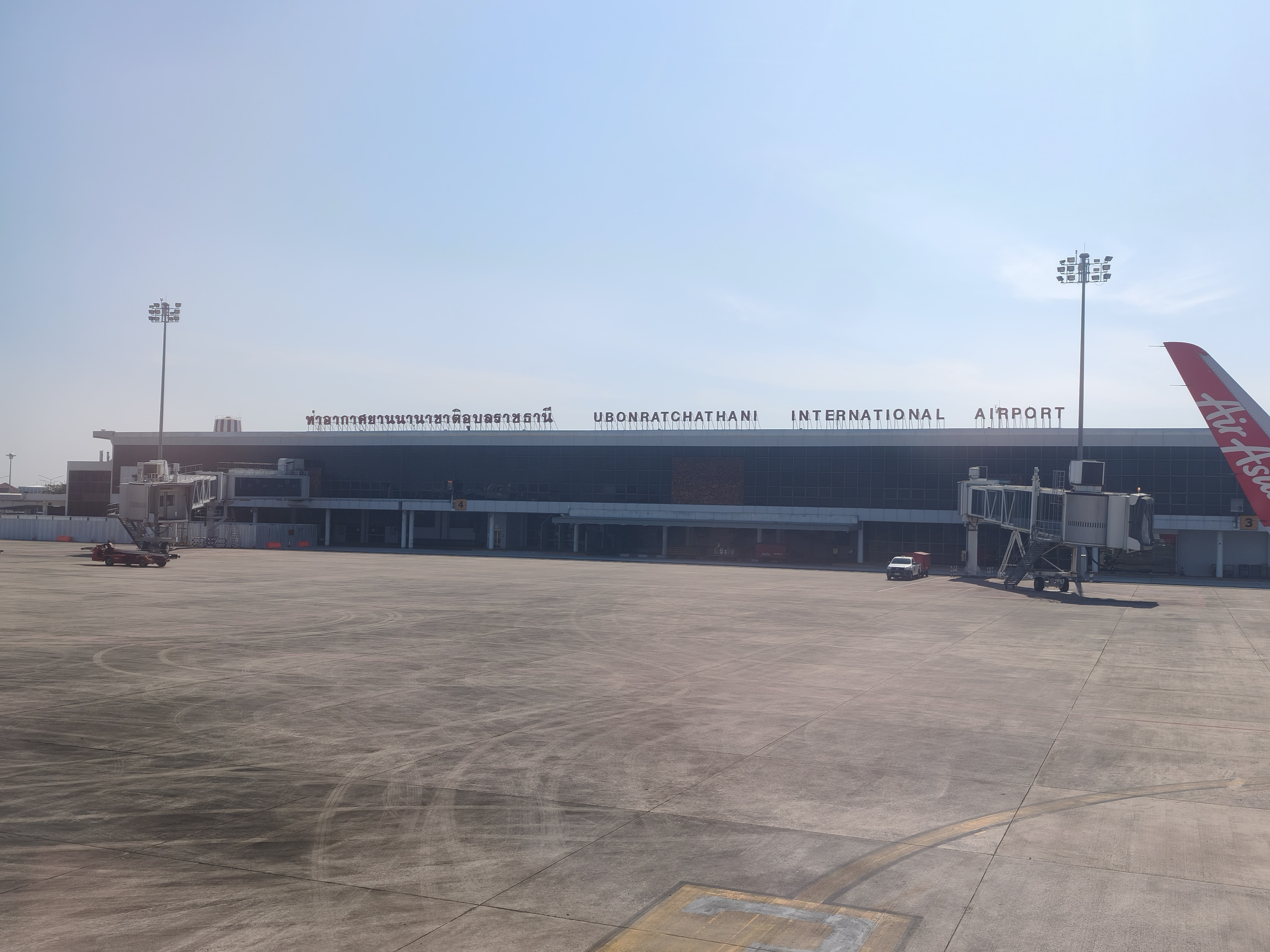
- IATA: UBP; ICAO: VTUU

Summary
- Airport type: Public / Military
- Owner: Royal Thai Air Force
- Operator: Department of Airports
- Serves: Ubon Ratchathani
- Location: Tambon Nai Mueang, Amphoe Mueang Ubon Ratchathani, Ubon Ratchathani, Thailand
- Opened: 1921; 105 years ago
- Elevation AMSL: 124 m / 406 ft
- Coordinates: 15°15′04.60″N 104°52′12.83″E
- Website: minisite.airports.go.th/ubonratchathani

Maps
- Location of airport in Thailand
- Interactive map of Ubon Ratchathani Airport

Runways
Direction	Length		Surface
Direction	ft	m	Surface
05/23	9,848	3,002	Asphalt

Statistics (2024)
- Passengers: 1,306,445 ▲0.81%
- Aircraft movements: 8,904 ▲4.60%
- Freight (tonnes): 312.02 ▼0.59%
- Sources: Department of Airports

Ubon Ratchathani Airport (IATA: UBP, ICAO: VTUU) is in Tambon Nai Mueang, Amphoe Mueang Ubon Ratchathani, Ubon Ratchathani province in Northeastern Thailand. It currently serves as both a commercial airport and as a Royal Thai Air Force base.

== History ==
The airport was first opened in 1921, when the nearby Warin Chamrap district was affected by smallpox and cholera epidemic. The authorities sent doctors and medical supplies by plane to Ubon Ratchathani.

In 1955 it became Ubon Royal Thai Air Force Base for the Vietnam War; in 1975 the facility became an international civilian airport, with direct flights to Vietnam. These flights proved unprofitable, and while the international signage is still in place, only domestic flights have operated for a number of years.

== Airlines and destinations ==
Airlines	Destinations
Nok Air	Bangkok–Don Mueang
Thai AirAsia	Bangkok–Don Mueang
Thai Airways International	Bangkok–Suvarnabhumi
Thai Lion Air	Bangkok–Don Mueang
Thai VietJet Air	Bangkok–Suvarnabhumi

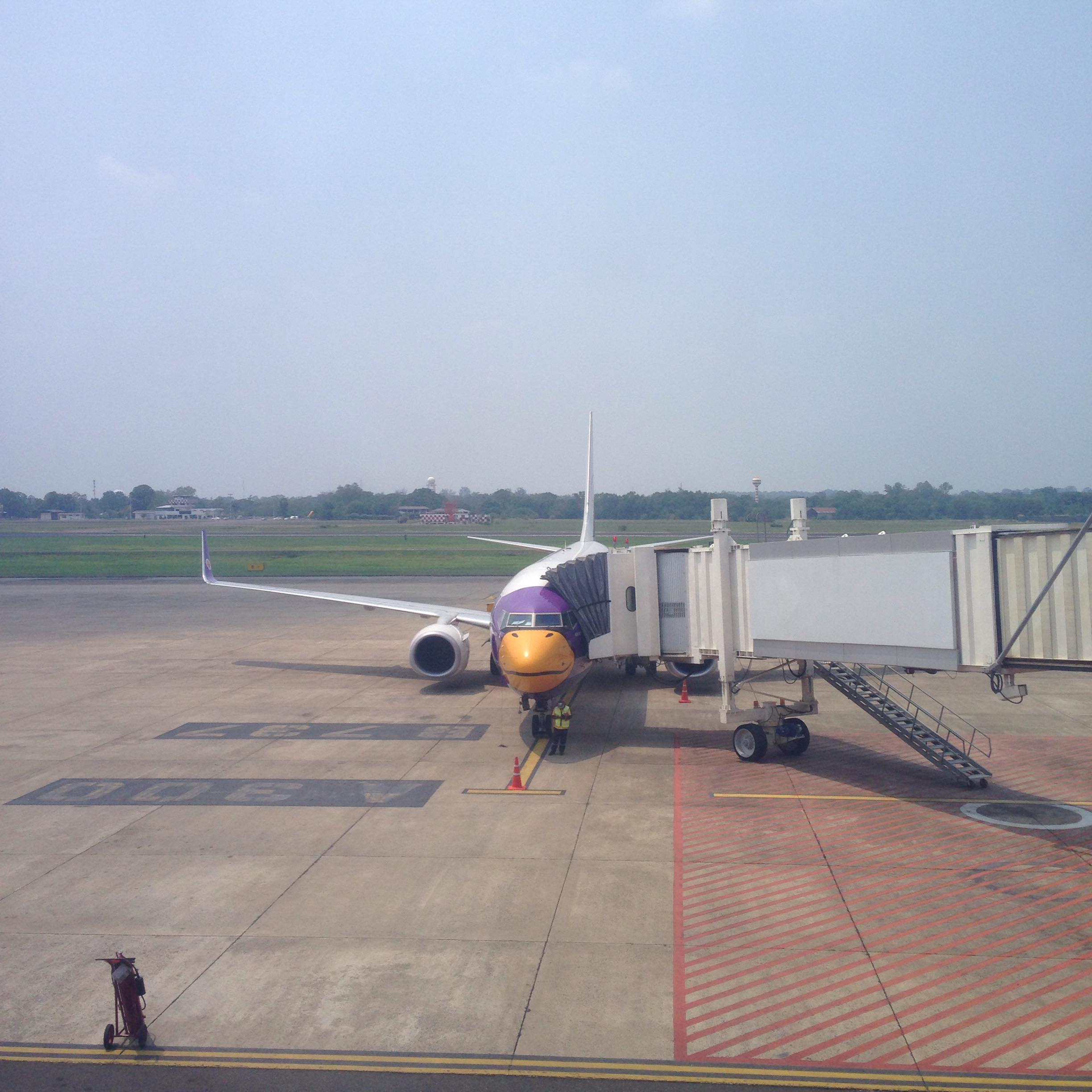
Nok Air at Ubon Ratchathani Airport

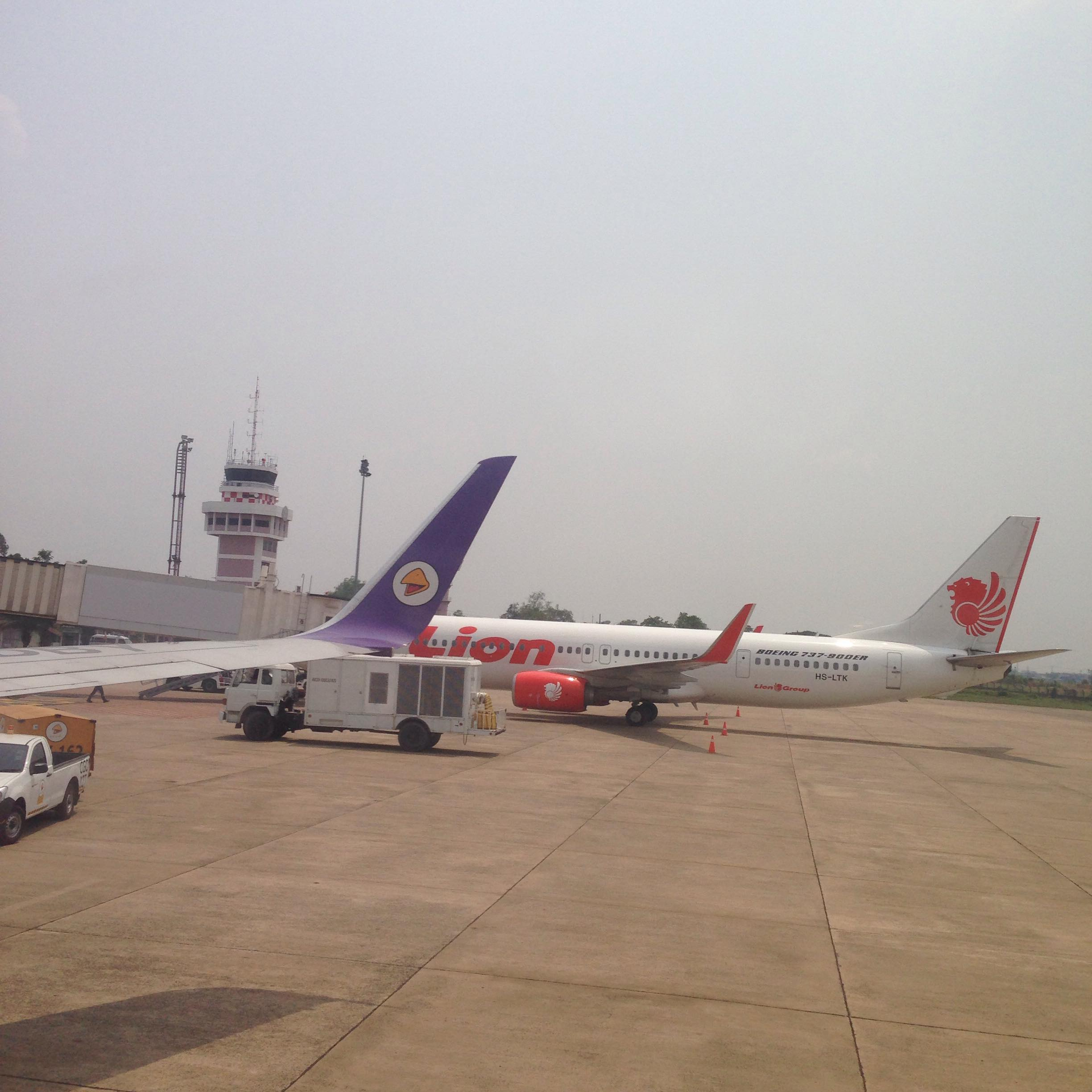
Thai Lion Air B737 - 900ER at Ubon Ratchathani Airport

== Statistics ==
=== Passenger movements ===
Year	Number of passengers	Aircraft movements
2005	387,159	2,986
2006	372,633	3,270
2007	387,586	3,369
2008	391,772	3,355
2009	393,449	2,930
2010	452,944	3,903
2011	614,686	5,370
2012	733,893	5,595
2013	835,648	6,340
2014	1,076,957	7,752
2015	1,467,256	10,951
2016	1,726,061	11,697
2017	1,791,828	12,042
2018	1,832,340	11,795
2019	1,790,734	12,017

=== Busiest domestic routes ===
Busiest domestic routes to and from Ubon Ratchathani Airport (2017)
Rank	Airport	Passengers handled
1	Bangkok–Don Mueang	1,411,945
2	Bangkok–Suvarnabhumi	259,721
3	Pattaya/Rayong (UTapao)	65,675
4	Chiang Mai	53,790

== Military use ==
Established in the 1950s as a Royal Thai Air Force base, it was used by the United States Air Force and the Royal Australian Air Force during the Vietnam War.

The airport is currently an active Royal Thai Air Force base, the home of 2nd Air Division/21st Wing Air Combat Command. The 211sq Eagles fly Northrup F-5E/F Tiger II fighter aircraft.
