= Loei Airport =

Airport in northeastern Thailand

Loei Airport ท่าอากาศยานเลย
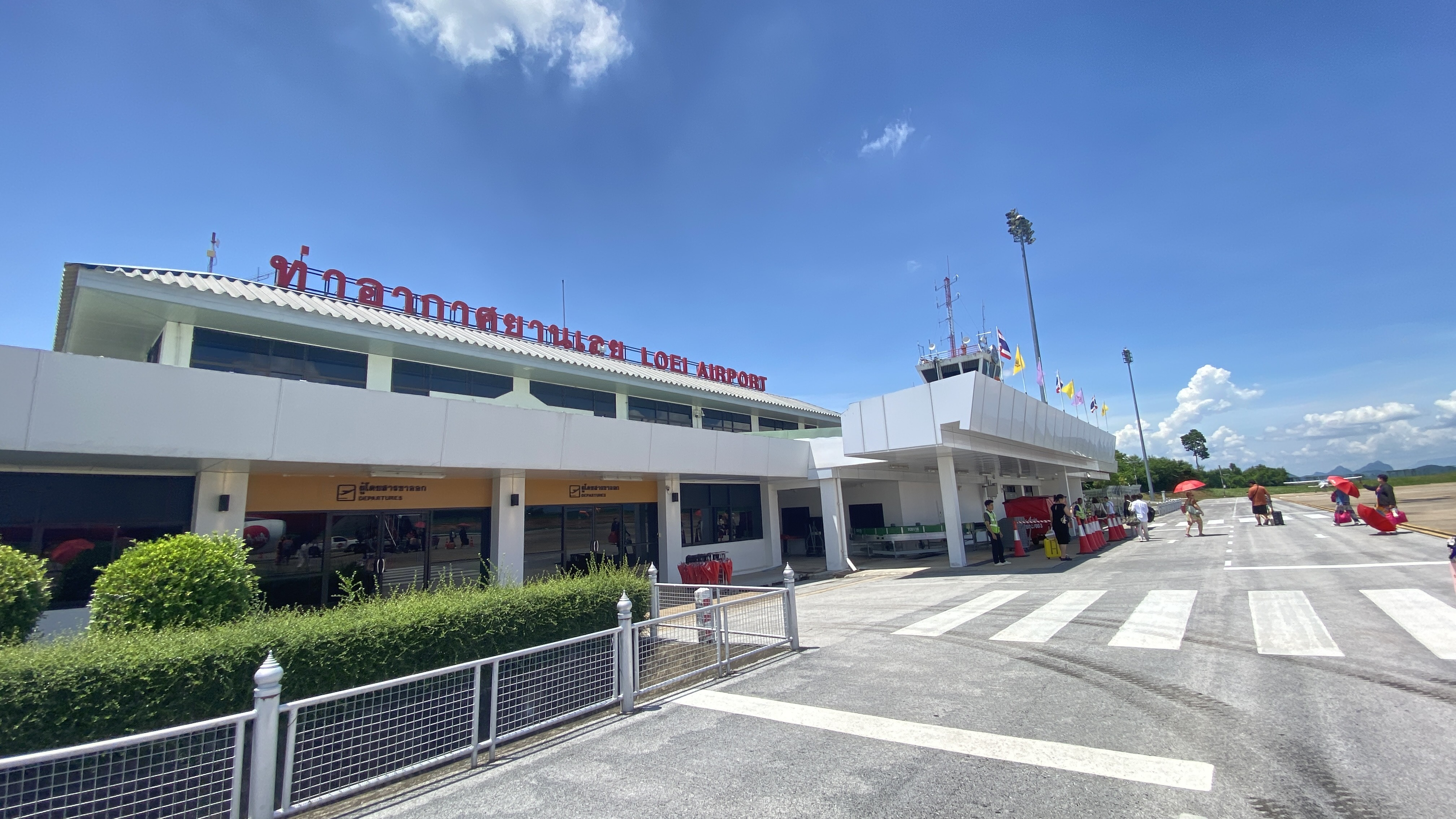
- Loei’s airport terminal
- IATA: LOE; ICAO: VTUL

Summary
- Airport type: Public
- Operator: Department of Airports
- Serves: Loei
- Location: Na An, Mueang, Loei, Thailand
- Opened: 13 December 1954; 71 years ago
- Elevation AMSL: 860 ft (260 m)
- Coordinates: 17°26′21″N 101°43′19″E
- Website: minisite.airports.go.th/loei

Maps
- Location of airport in Thailand
- Interactive map of Loei Airport

Runways
Direction	Length		Surface
Direction	ft	m	Surface
01/19	6,890	2,100	Asphalt

Statistics (2024)
- Passengers: 198,733 ▲1.81%
- Aircraft Movements: 1,754 ▲33.48%
- Freight (tonnes): -
- Sources: Department of Airports

Loei Airport (IATA: LOE, ICAO: VTUL) is in Na An subdistrict, Mueang Loei district, Loei province in northeastern Thailand.

== History ==
Loei Airport was originally located in a temporary location of eight kilometers southwest from the city. In 1942, Governor Tien Kamtetphet began planning the construction of Loei Airport by relocating it from the temporary airport near the provincial hall, which was in the city center. Forest clearing and land levelling was done to construct a runway for official operations. In 1946, the Royal Thai Air Force took over ownership. They facilitated upgrades such as the construction of a passenger terminal and also by improving the runway.

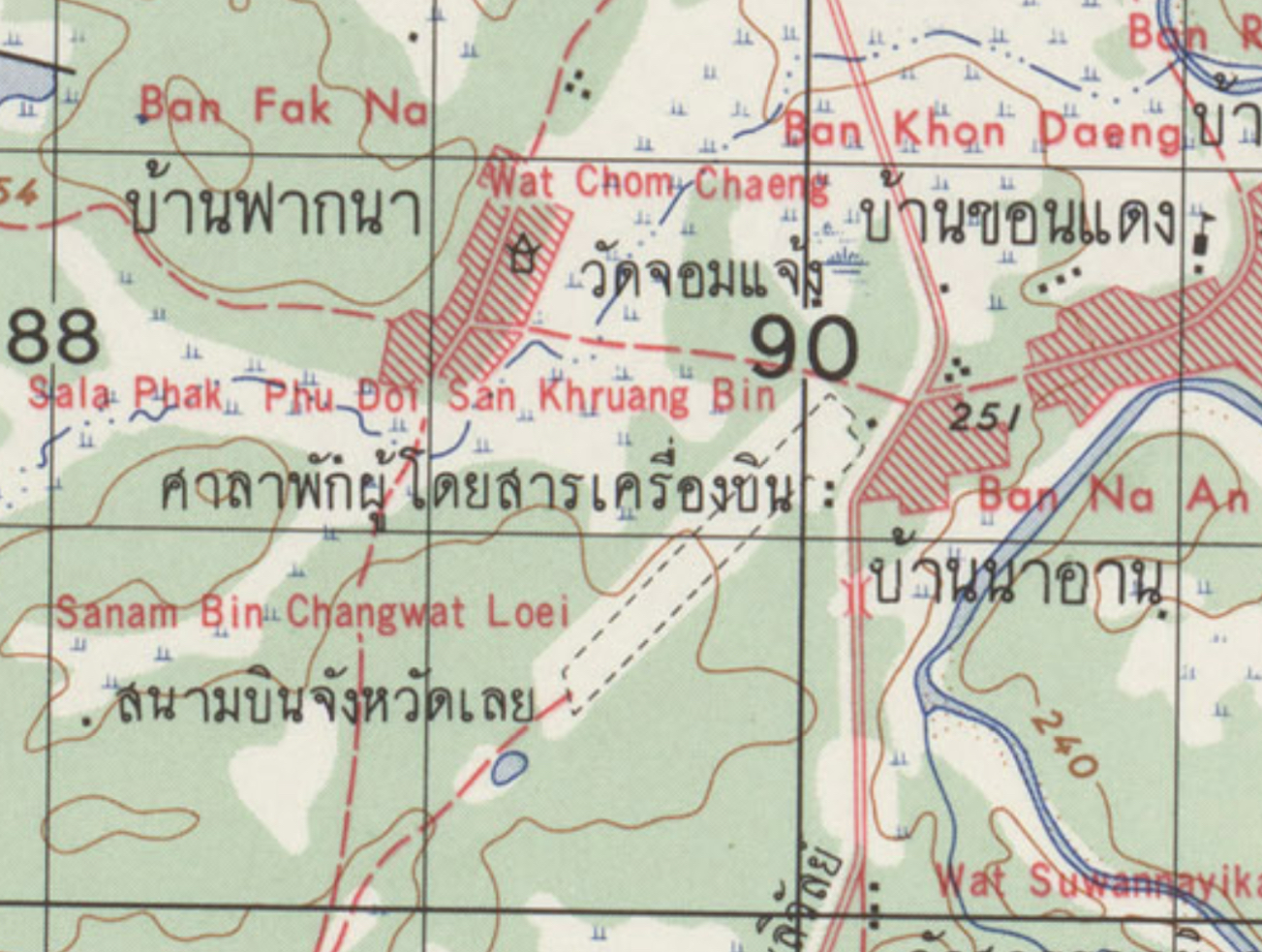
Loei Airport in 1959, with the original runway alignment.

On 13 December, 1953, Loei Airport had officially opened and was declared a licensed airport. In 1968, the Department of Commercial Aviation took ownership and began upgrades on the runway, building a fire department, an engine workshop, and navigation aids. The 1968 National Economic and Social Development Plan earmarked the installation of three sets of Single-sideband modulation navigational equipment in Loei Airport. The plan also included runway improvements. Controversially, construction works took place over an archeology site located on the western edge of Ban Na An, directly north of the terminal. The site held the ruins of Wat Pho Chai, and a survey team in 1969 led by local Nai Mi Somasi discovered the area had been largely destroyed by heavy machinery during earthworks. Only a severely damaged foundation of a Buddhist ordination hall remained, and a few pottery sherds were recovered.

In 1972, the government acquired more land by purchase to expand the airport’s facilities, which included runway extensions, taxiways, aircraft parking areas, a new passenger terminal, and engine workshop buildings. On 20 January, 2016, the government approved the push to designate Loei Airport as a customs airport, which was successfully achieved in 2017. On 17 September, 2018, the government approved the purchase of an additional 360 rai (181 acres) of land to expand the apron and build a new passenger terminal.

In the past, the airfield was served by Andaman Air, Nok Air, AirAsia, Happy Air, Thai Smile Airways and Solar Air. Only AirAsia currently operates there.

== Transportation ==
Currently, Loei Airport’s way of exit and entry is served by rental-car booths, tuk-tuks and taxis.

== Airlines and destinations ==
Airlines	Destinations
Thai AirAsia	Bangkok–Don Mueang
