= Roi Et Airport =

Airport in northeastern Thailand

Roi Et Airport ท่าอากาศยานร้อยเอ็ด
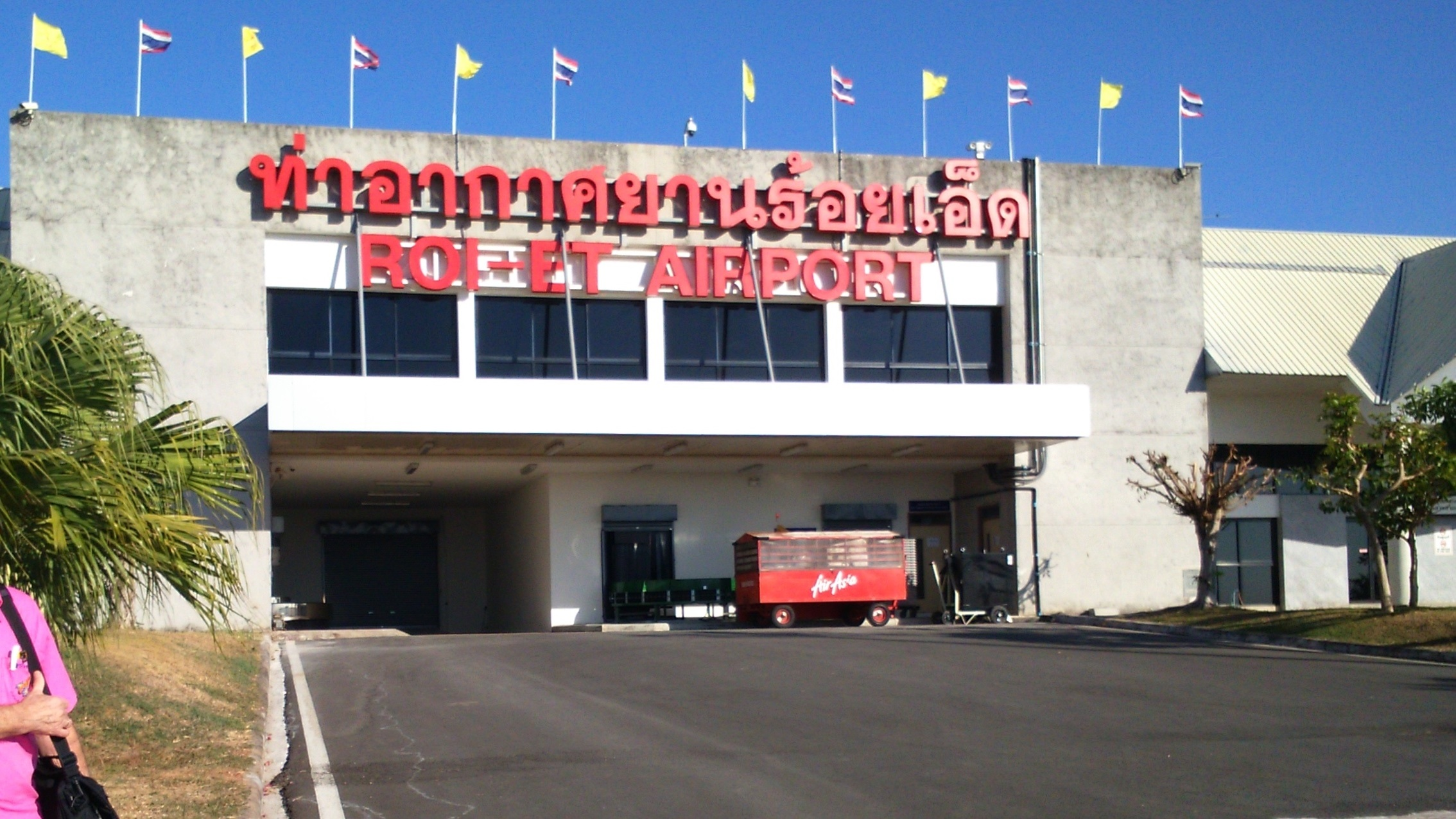
- IATA: ROI; ICAO: VTUV

Summary
- Airport type: Public
- Operator: Department of Airports
- Serves: Roi Et province
- Location: Nong Phok, Thawat Buri district, Roi Et province, Thailand
- Opened: 2 March 1999; 27 years ago
- Elevation AMSL: 137 m (449 ft)
- Coordinates: 16°07′00″N 103°46′25″E
- Website: minisite.airports.go.th/roiet

Maps
- Location of airport in Thailand
- Interactive map of Roi Et Airport

Runways
Direction	Length		Surface
Direction	m	ft	Surface
18/36	2,100	6,890	Asphalt

Statistics (2024)
- Passengers: 342,970 ▼1.67%
- Aircraft movements: 3,989 ▲83.99%
- Freight (tonnes): -
- Source: DAFIF

Roi Et Airport (IATA: ROI, ICAO: VTUV) is a domestic airport in Nong Phok subdistrict, Thawat Buri district, Roi Et province in Northeastern Thailand, and is approximately 11 kilometres from downtown Roi Et.

The airport consists of a passenger terminal measuring 3,013 square meters, the arrival and departure gates on the same floor, a runway 45 x 2,100 meters, and an apron measuring 85 x 324 meters, which can accommodate Boeing 737 or Airbus A320 aircraft.

The airport currently serves flights to Don Mueang International Airport in Bangkok.

== History ==
Originally the airport was a military airfield under the supervision of the Royal Thai Army.

In 1989, the Department of Air Transport approved the construction of Roi Et Airport. The allocated budget was 601,916.983.98 baht. Construction of the airport began on August 11, 1995 and completed in 1999. Construction took approximately three years with an area of approximately 2,700 rai. The runway is 2,100 meters long. 45 meters wide, 60 meters long on each side, 45 meters wide, the taxiway is 23 meters wide, 10.5 meters wide on each side, the general terrain is plains and grasslands. The airport officially opened on March 2, 1999.

In 2020, Roi Et airport received 110 million baht to raise its annual handling capacity to 750,000 passengers. Thereafter, Roi Et Airport commenced its expansion and renovation project, which was completed in December 2022. This project increased the passenger handling capacity of the airport to 1.2 million passengers per year.

As of 2024, there is one airline that provides service, Thai AirAsia which operates daily flights to Don Mueang International Airport in Bangkok. Thai Smile did operate daily flights to Suvarnabhumi Airport from January 2022, but stopped in September 2022.

== Airlines and destinations ==
Airlines	Destinations
Thai AirAsia	Bangkok–Don Mueang
