= Department of Airports (Thailand) =

Government agency

- กรมท่าอากาศยาน krom tha akatsayan

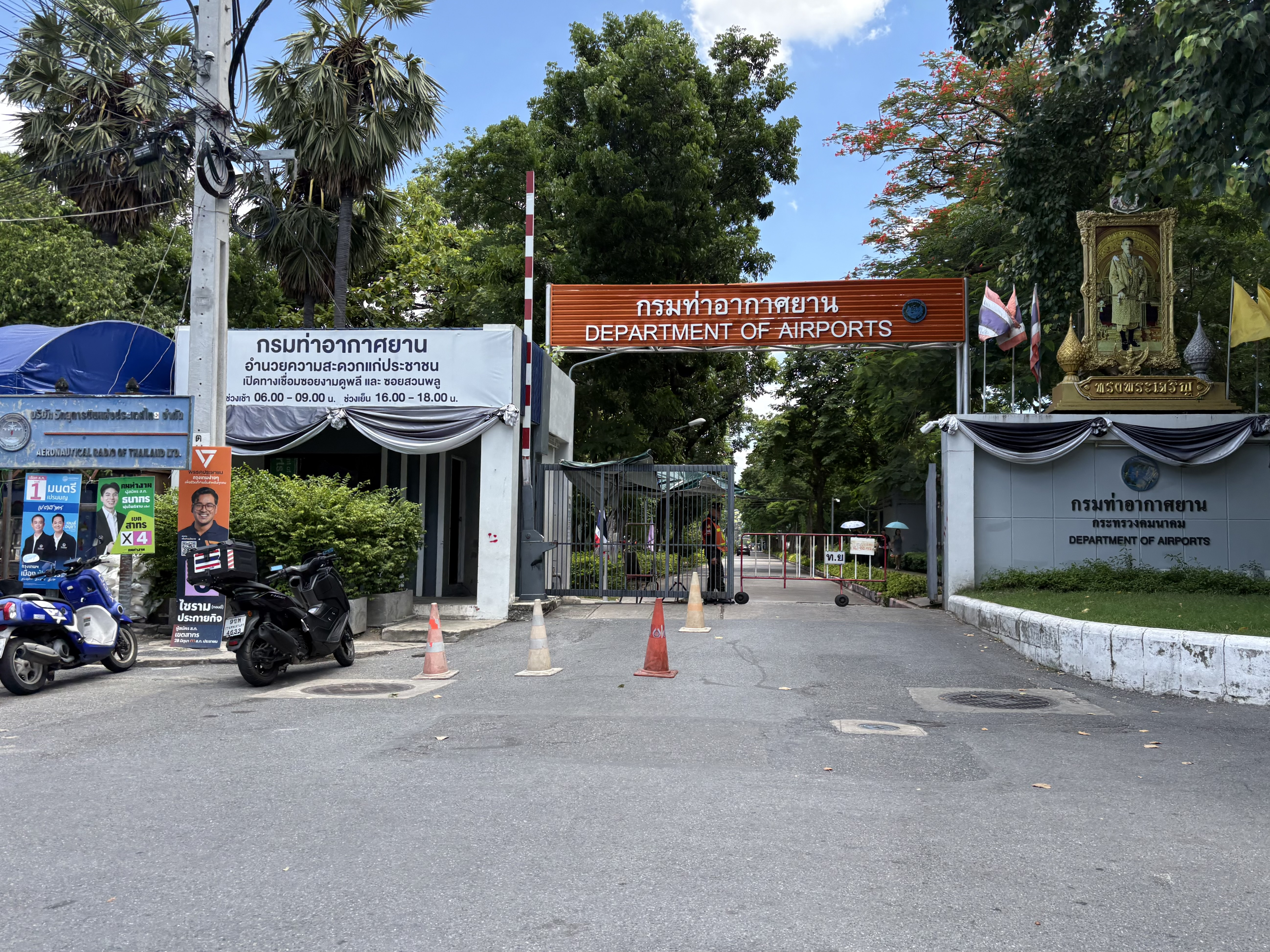
- The headquarters in Sathon district, Bangkok

Department overview
- Formed: 3 October 2015; 10 years ago
- Headquarters: 71 Soi Ngam Du Phli, Rama IV Road, Thung Maha Mek subdistrict, Sathon district, Bangkok, Thailand 10120; 13.7176474°N 100.5430954°E
- Motto: Smile, Happy, Cosy at our Home
- Department executive: Phisak Jitwiriya-Wasin, Director-General
- Parent Department: Ministry of Transport
- Website: www.airports.go.th

The Department of Airports (DOA) (Thai: กรมท่าอากาศยาน, RTGS: krok tha akatsayan) is a Thai government department under the Ministry of Transport. It operates 28 civil airports throughout the country. The department was split off from the Department of Civil Aviation in 2015, part of a restructuring response to ICAO's downgrading of Thailand's aviation safety rating. The other agency that previously formed part of the old department is the Civil Aviation Authority of Thailand.

== Operations ==
Only 17 DOA airports turned a profit between 2009 and 2016 while the total number of passengers jumped 25 percent. In 2018, DOA's revenues from its 28 airports was 853 million baht. Krabi airport alone contributed 469 million baht. Udon Thani is also in the black, with profits reaching 100 million baht a year.

Airports of Thailand PCL (AOT) had planned to assume management of Udon Thani International Airport, Sakon Nakhon Airport, Tak Airport, and Chumphon Airport in 2019. The DOA would relinquish control, reducing the airports under its control to 24. In a change of plans in August 2019, AOT proposed instead to take control of the Udon Thani, Tak, Buriram, and Krabi airports, leaving Sakon Nakhon and Chumphon airports to the DOA. DOA insists that the earlier plan be followed as it would retain its money-making airports.

== List of airports ==
=== Northern Thailand ===
- Lampang Airport
- Mae Hong Son Airport
- Mae Sot Airport
- Nan Nakhon Airport
- Pai Airport
- Phetchabun Airport
- Phitsanulok Airport
- Phrae Airport
- Tak Airport

=== Northeastern Thailand ===
- Buriram Airport
- Khon Kaen Airport
- Loei Airport
- Nakhon Phanom Airport
- Nakhon Ratchasima Airport
- Roi Et Airport
- Sakon Nakhon Airport
- Ubon Ratchathani Airport
- Udon Thani International Airport

=== Southern Thailand ===
- Betong Airport
- Chumphon Airport
- Hua Hin Airport
- Krabi International Airport
- Nakhon Si Thammarat Airport
- Narathiwat Airport
- Pattani Airport
- Ranong Airport
- Surat Thani International Airport
- Trang Airport

== Third Bangkok airport ==
In mid-2019, the DOA proposed the construction of a new airport in Nakhon Pathom Province to relieve pressure on Bangkok's Don Mueang and Suvarnabhumi airports (both controlled by Airports of Thailand (AOT)). The 20 billion baht airport, to occupy 3,500 rai straddling the Bang Len and Nakhon Chai Si districts, 50 kilometres west of Bangkok. Its capacity would be 25 million passengers per year. If approved, construction would start in 2023 and the airport would be operational by 2025 or 2026.
