= Thawat Buri district =

Thawat Buri ธวัชบุรี
- District
- District location in Roi Et province
- Coordinates: 16°02′19″N 103°44′49″E
- Country: Thailand
- Province: Roi Et
- Seat: Niwet

Area
  - Total: 374.0 km^{2} (144.4 sq mi)

Population (2005)
  - Total: 68,431
  - Density: 183/km^{2} (470/sq mi)
- Time zone: UTC+7 (ICT)
- Postal code: 45170
- Geocode: 4505

Thawat Buri (Thai: ธวัชบุรี, pronounced [tʰā.wát bū.rīː]; Northeastern Thai: ธวัชบุรี, pronounced [tʰā.wàt bū.lîː]) is a district (amphoe) of Roi Et province, Thailand.

== Geography ==
The district is in central Roi Et Province. Neighboring districts are (from the north clockwise): Chiang Khwan, Selaphum, Thung Khao Luang, At Samat, and Mueang Roi Et.

== History ==
In 1913 the district was renamed from Uthai Roi Et (อุไทยร้อยเอ็ด) to Saeng Badan (แซงบาดาล). In 1939 it received its current name, Thawat Buri.

== Administration ==
The district is divided into 12 sub-districts (tambons), which are further subdivided into 147 villages (mubans). There are two sub-district municipalities (thesaban tambons). Ban Niwet covers parts of tambon Niwet, Thong Thani covers tambon Thong Thani and parts of Bueng Nakhon. There are a further 11 tambon administrative organizations (TAO).

No.	Name	Thai name	Villages	Pop.
1.	Niwet	นิเวศน์	17	8,960
2.	Thong Thani	ธงธานี	10	6,188
3.	Nong Phai	หนองไผ่	18	7,626
4.	Thawat Buri	ธวัชบุรี	12	4,792
6.	Um Mao	อุ่มเม้า	15	7,690
7.	Ma-ue	มะอึ	10	5,508
10.	Khwao Thung	เขวาทุ่ง	10	4,548
15.	Phaisan	ไพศาล	9	4,042
17.	Mueang Noi	เมืองน้อย	13	5,163
20.	Bueng Nakhon	บึงนคร	13	6,219
22.	Ratchathani	ราชธานี	11	3,573
24.	Nong Phok	หนองพอก	9	4,122

Missing numbers are tambons which now form Chiang Khwan and Thung Khao Luang Districts.
