= Ranong Airport =

Airport in southern Thailand

Ranong Airport ท่าอากาศยานระนอง
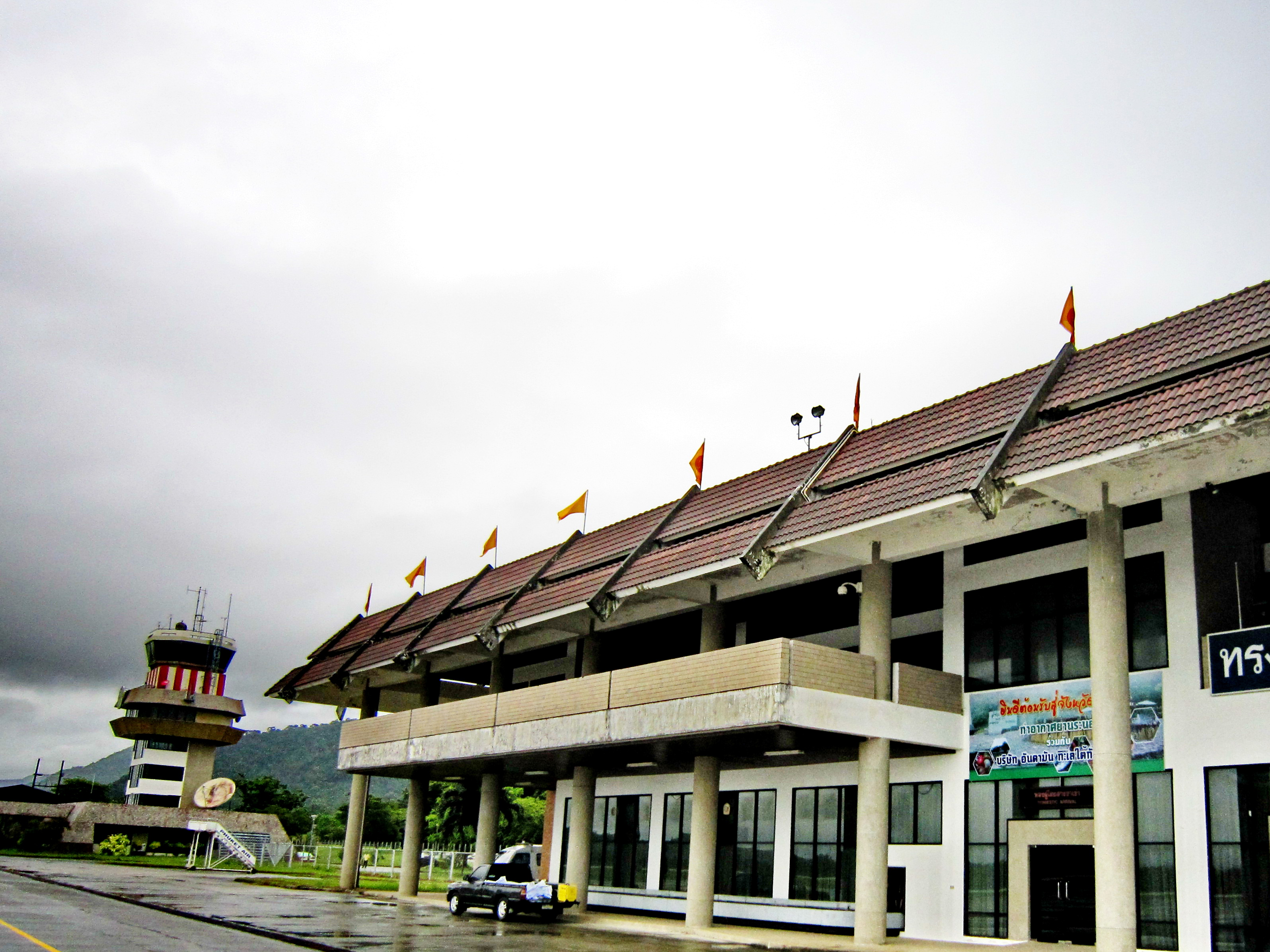
- IATA: UNN; ICAO: VTSR

Summary
- Airport type: Public
- Operator: Department of Airports
- Serves: Ranong
- Location: Ratchakrut, Mueang, Ranong, Thailand
- Opened: 18 May 1995; 31 years ago
- Elevation AMSL: 57 ft (17 m)
- Coordinates: 09°46′39″N 98°35′07″E

Maps
- Location of airport in Thailand
- Interactive map of Ranong Airport

Runways
Direction	Length		Surface
Direction	m	ft	Surface
02/20	2,000	6,562	Concrete

Statistics (2025)
- Passengers: 131,104 ▲7.88%
- Aircraft movements: 889 ▲13.66%
- Freight (tonnes): 0.00
- Sources: Department of Airports

Ranong Airport (IATA: UNN, ICAO: VTSR) is in Ratchakrut subdistrict, Mueang Ranong district, Ranong province in southern Thailand.

== Location ==
Ranong airport serves the province of Ranong in the southern part of the country, it is located 500 km from Bangkok. The airport is located in a flat area at an altitude of 17 m above sea level, from the east there is a mountain range, between it and the airport territory there is highway number 4. The highest point of this area is Mount Khao Nom Sao (1089 m), 6 km from the airport.

== History ==
Construction started on 30 March 1993, completed on 18 May 1995. The first aircraft to be received by Ranong airport was a Boeing 737 with 150 passengers on board. The main terminal area is about 4 thousand square meters and is designed for 300 passengers. In 2019, the airport served 2,237 flights and 170 thousand passengers.

== Airlines and destinations ==
Airlines	Destinations
Thai AirAsia	Bangkok–Don Mueang

As of January 2025, there are no international flights to Ranong.
