= Narathiwat Airport =

Airport in southern Thailand

Narathiwat Airport ท่าอากาศยานนราธิวาส
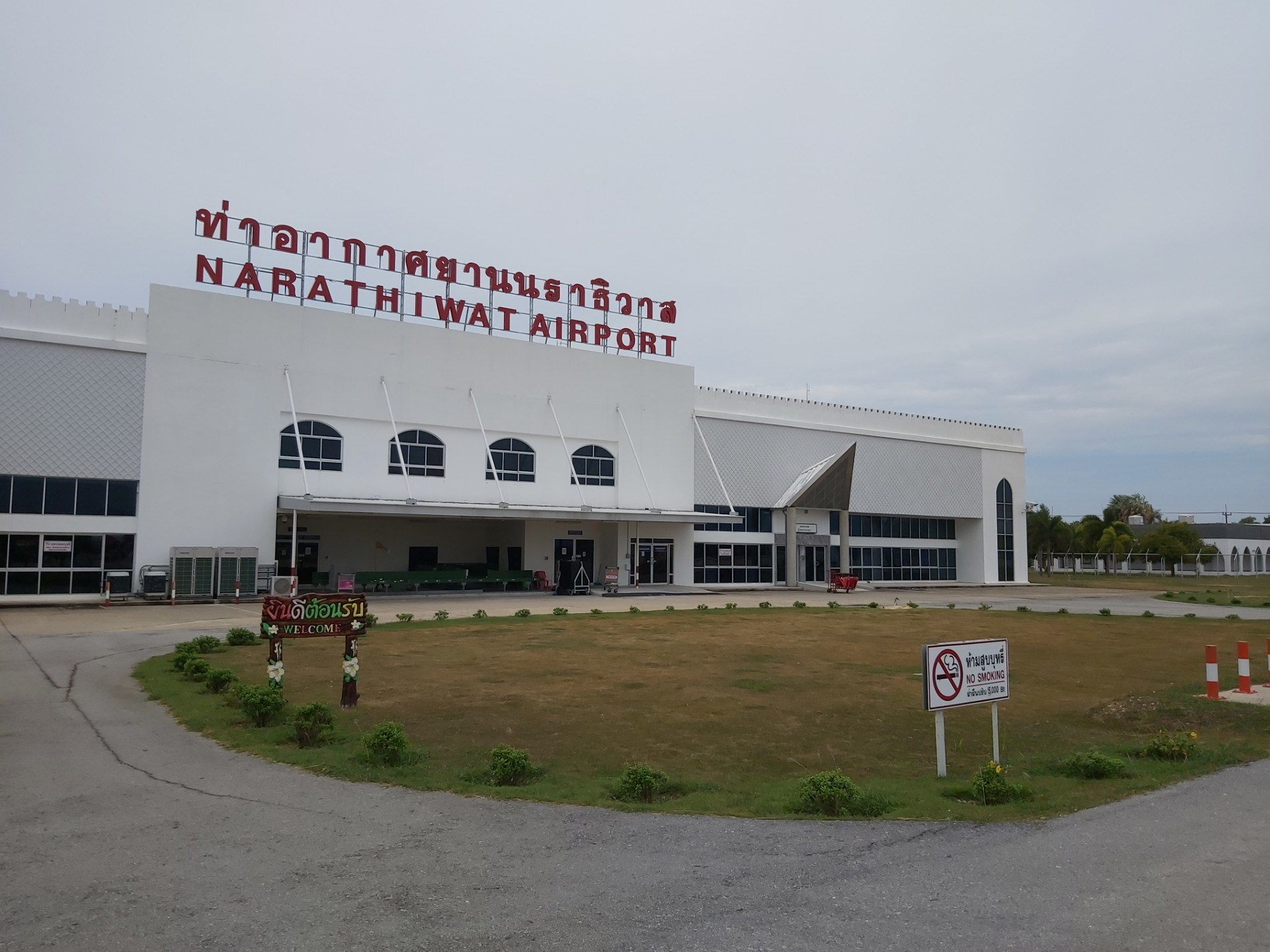
- IATA: NAW; ICAO: VTSC

Summary
- Airport type: Public / Military
- Owner: Royal Thai Navy
- Operator: Department of Airports
- Serves: Narathiwat
- Location: Khok Khian, Mueang Narathiwat, Narathiwat, Thailand
- Opened: 1974; 52 years ago
- Elevation AMSL: 16 ft / 5 m
- Coordinates: 06°31′12″N 101°44′36″E
- Website: minisite.airports.go.th/narathiwat

Maps
- Location within Thailand
- Interactive map of Narathiwat Airport

Runways
Direction	Length		Surface
Direction	ft	m	Surface
02/20	8,202	2,500	Asphalt

Statistics (2025)
- Passengers: 202,365 ▲10%
- Aircraft movements: 1,522 ▲18.04%
- Freight (tonnes): -
- Sources: Department of Airports

Narathiwat Airport (IATA: NAW, ICAO: VTSC) is an airport in Khok Khian subdistrict, Mueang Narathiwat district, Narathiwat province in southern Thailand.

Narathiwat Airport was constructed in 1974 at the same time as the Thaksin Rajaniwet Palace. Serving the Narathiwat province, the airport is mainly used by the royal family, military and people who live in Narathiwat and near this area.

Due to the length of runway around 2,500 meters, Narathwat airport can serve Airbus A300-600 as 1 slot, Boeing 737-400 as 2 slots, airplane limited at least 80 seats as 1 slot, and helicopter 212/UH-IN as 2 slots at the same time.

Currently there are only direct flights from the Narathiwat Airport to Bangkok which operate on a daily and bi-daily basis, however, recent planning by the Department of Airports suggests the terminal will undergo major upgrades which is resulting in the planning of additional routes to and from Narathiwat from both domestic and international airlines.

The Narathiwat Airport is located on the road number 4136 (Narathiwat - Ban Thorn). There are 8 customer parking lots that contained around 350 cars by two types of parking are

1. Day time parking lots (no longer than a night) which are lots number 1, 2, 5, 6, 7, 8 for passengers and staffs.
2. Overnight time parking lots (over a night) which are lots number 3 and 4. The passengers who need to use overnight parking lot must register at registration desk is in front of airport terminal with the identification card without fee, but the airport does not take any responsibilities for damage and disaster occurrence.

== Airlines and destinations ==
The airport only serves domestic flights to Bangkok, previously it was an international airport and operated seasonal charter flight to Medina.

Airlines	Destinations
Thai AirAsia	Bangkok–Don Mueang, Bangkok–Suvarnabhumi

== Other airports nearby ==
Kota Bharu Airport, Kelantan Malaysia 72 km.

Betong Airport, Yala, Thailand 104 km.

Sultan Abdul Halim Airport, Kepala Batas, Kedah, Malaysia 153 km.

Hat Yai International Airport, Songkhla, Thailand 156 km.
