= Solar Air =

Thai airline

| IATA | ICAO | Call sign |
|---|---|---|
| — | SRB | SOLAR THAI |
- Founded: 2004
- Ceased operations: 2010
- Hubs: Don Mueang International Airport
- Fleet size: 3
- Destinations: 0
- Parent company: Solar Aviation Co., Ltd
- Headquarters: Don Muang, Bangkok, Thailand
- Key people: Subodh Sapkota (CEO)

Solar Aviation Co., Ltd., which operated as Solar Air, (Thai: โซล่าแอร์) was a Thai airline based at the Don Mueang International Airport. The airline ceased all operations in 2010.

== Destinations ==
Solar Air was flying to Bangkok, Hua Hin, Chumphon and other destinations in Thailand, as well as destinations in Cambodia, like Siem Reap.

== Fleet ==
The airline is not flying and all routes were taken over by Nok Air

Solar Air fleet
| Aircraft | In service | Orders | Passengers | Routes |
|---|---|---|---|---|
| Dornier 228 | 2 | 0 | 19 | 6 |
| Saab 340A | 1 | 0 | 33 | 2 |
