= Phitsanulok Airport =

Airport in northern Thailand

Phitsanulok Airport ท่าอากาศยานพิษณุโลก
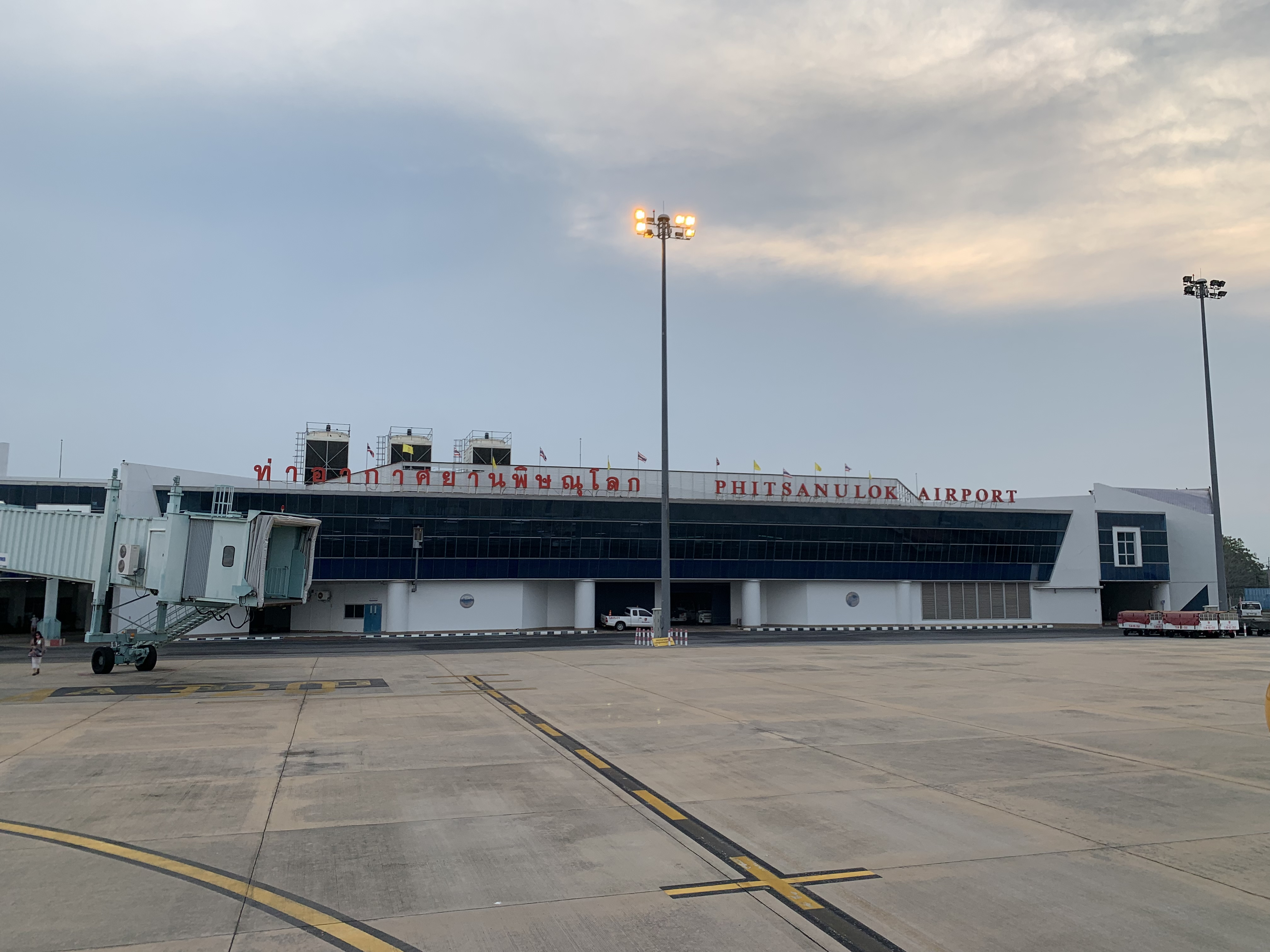
- IATA: PHS; ICAO: VTPP

Summary
- Airport type: Public
- Owner: Royal Thai Air Force (RTAF)
- Operator: Department of Airports
- Serves: Phitsanulok
- Location: Amphoe Mueang Phitsanulok, Phitsanulok, Thailand
- Opened: 1941; 85 years ago
- Elevation AMSL: 47 m / 154 ft
- Coordinates: 16°46′23″N 100°16′56″E

Maps
- Location of airport in Thailand
- Interactive map of Phitsanulok Airport

Runways
Direction	Length		Surface
Direction	m	ft	Surface
14/32	3,000	9,843	Asphalt

Statistics (2025)
- Passengers: 517,449 ▲12.67%
- Aircraft movements: 3,674 ▲15.82%
- Freight (tonnes): 16.52 ▼2.97%
- Source: DAFIF

Phitsanulok Airport (IATA: PHS, ICAO: VTPP) is in Amphoe Mueang Phitsanulok, Phitsanulok province of Northern Thailand. The airport is south of the city's downtown area.

== Airlines and destinations ==
In 2019 it handles 689,392 passengers, 5,661 flights and 150,980 kilograms (332,850 lb) of cargo.

Airlines	Destinations
Nok Air	Bangkok–Don Mueang
Thai AirAsia	Bangkok–Don Mueang
Thai Lion Air	Bangkok–Don Mueang

== Miscellaneous ==
To the right and to the left of the tarmac are two decommissioned Boeing 747 jets from Orient Thai Airlines. The airline ceased operations and filed for bankruptcy in October 2018.

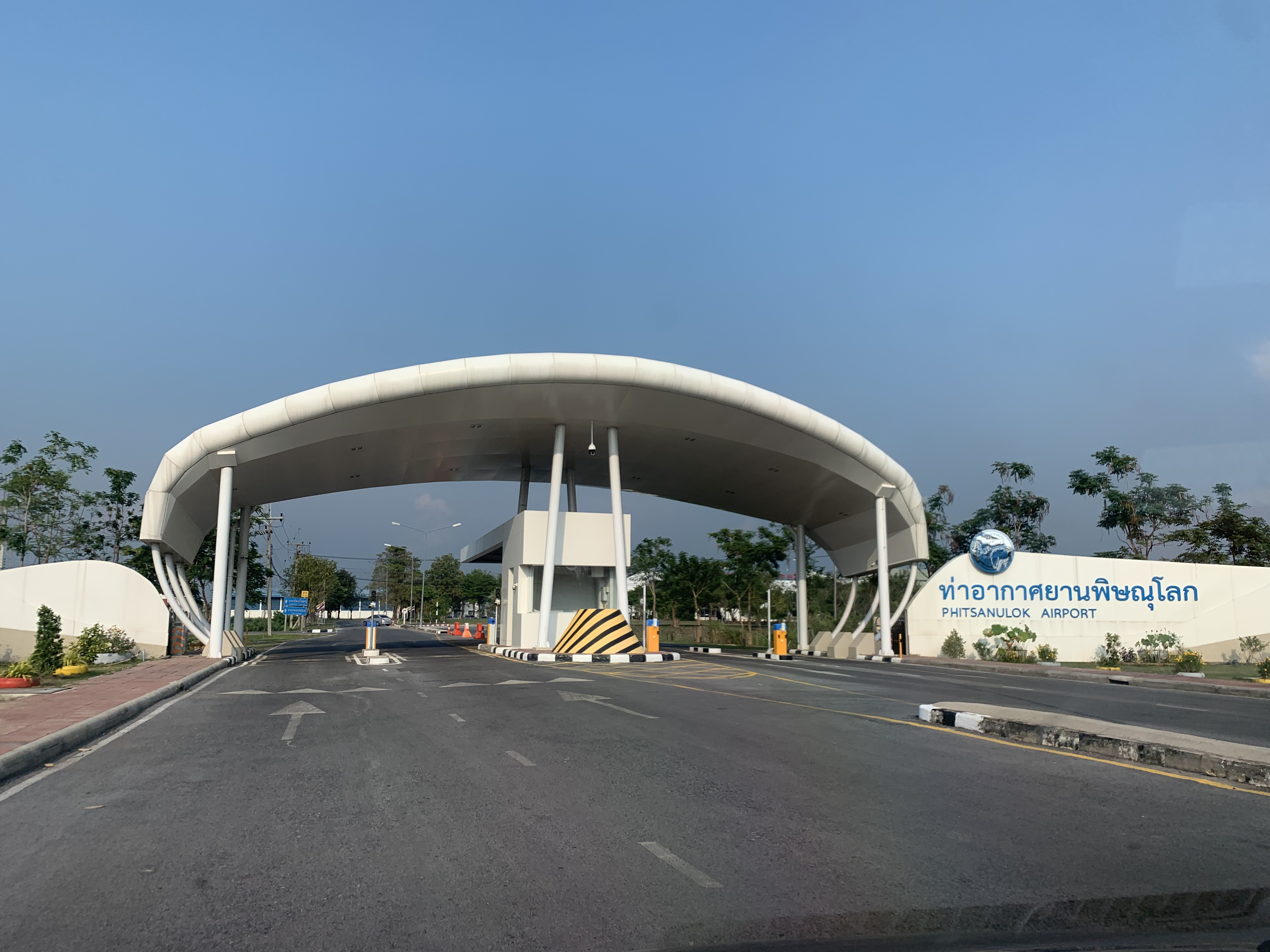
Entrance gate to Phitsanulok Airport (2022)

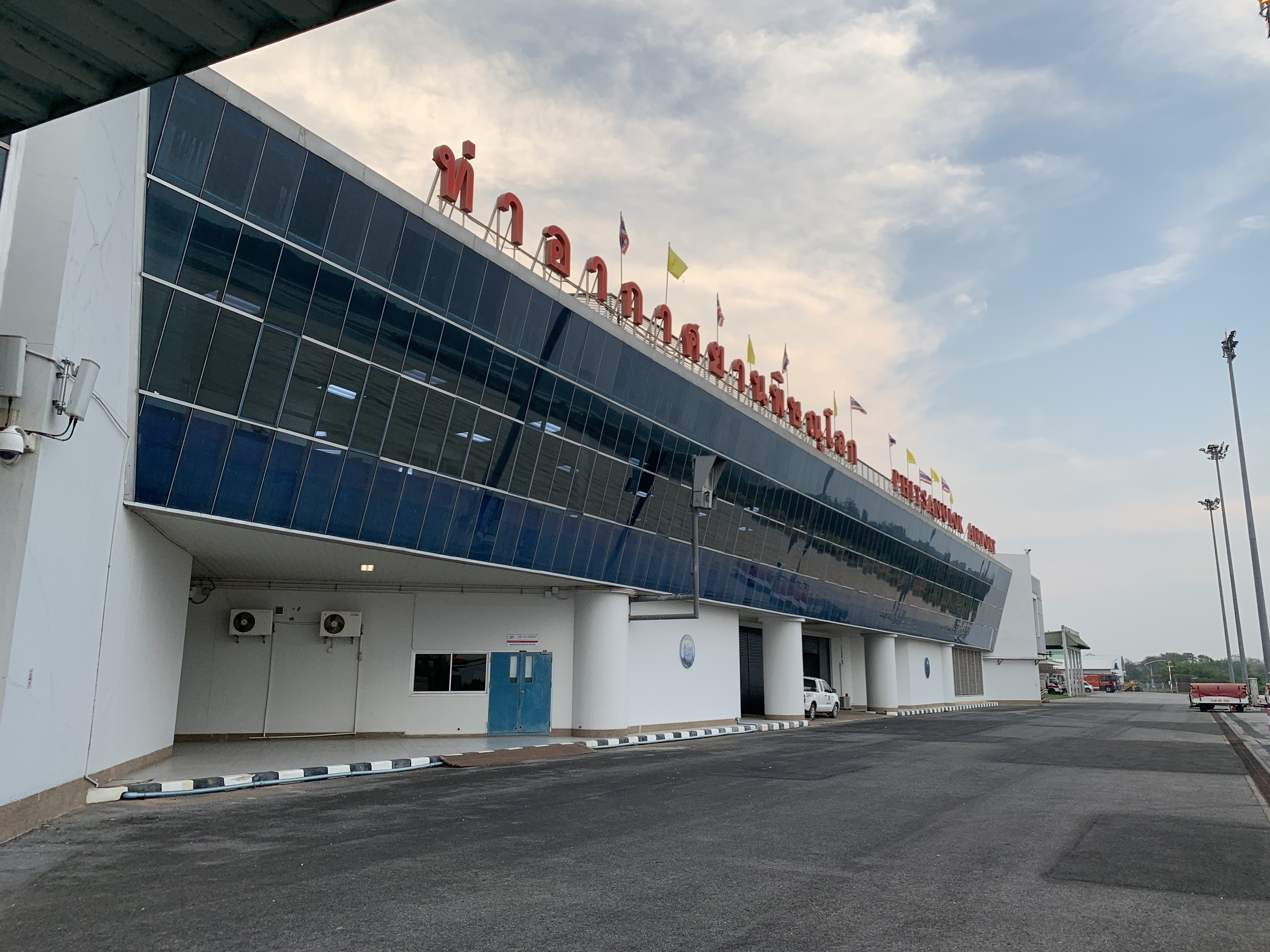
Terminal of Phitsanulok Airport (2022)

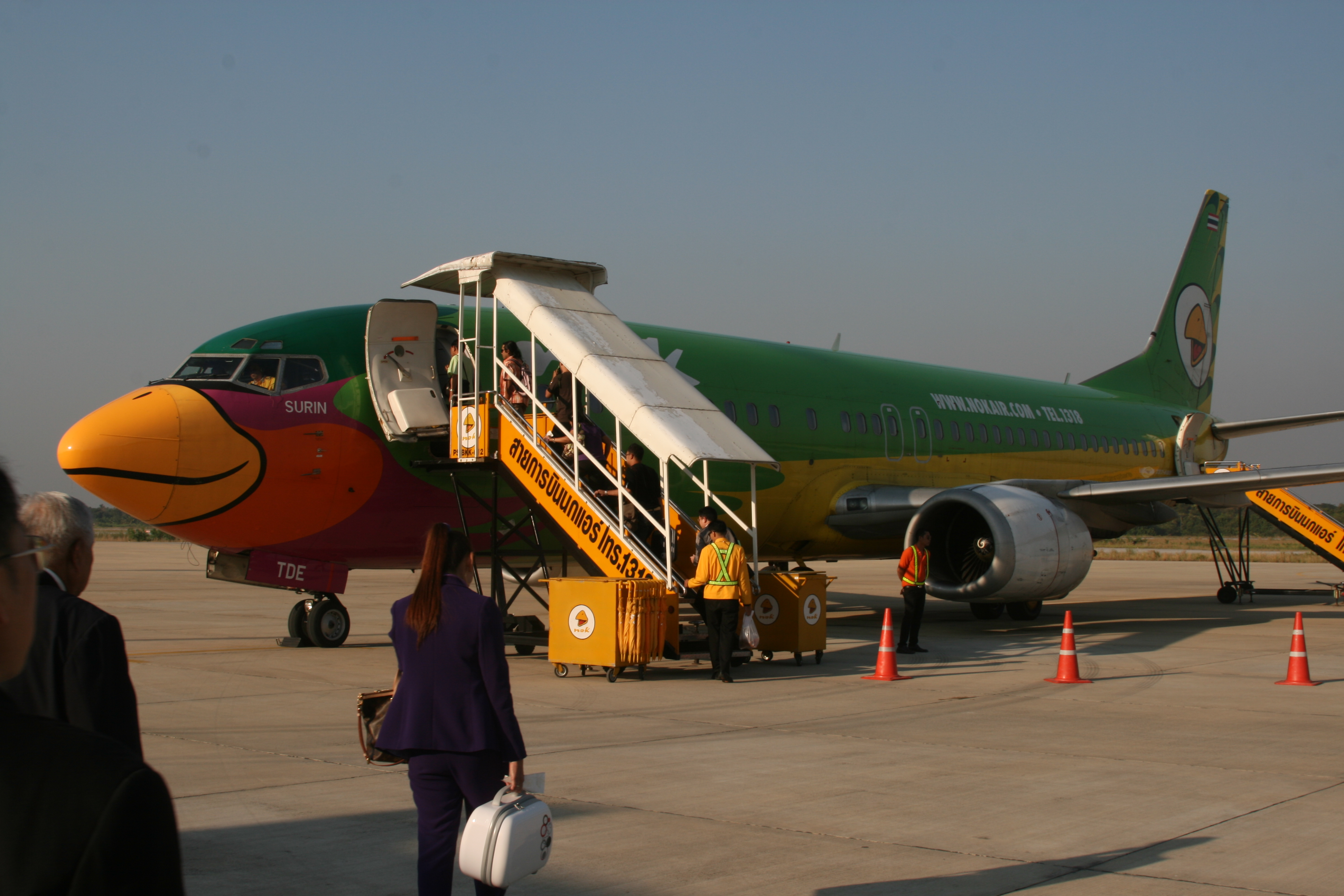
Nok-Air Boeing 737-400 at Phitsanulok (2011)

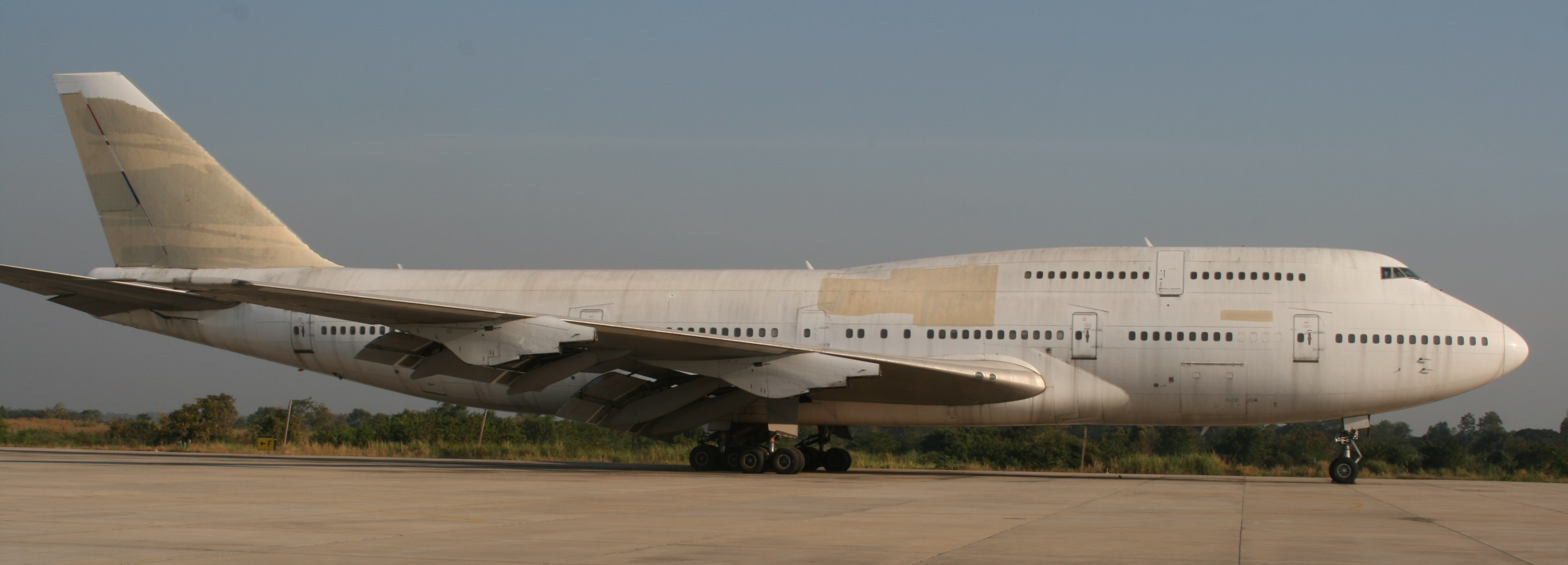
Decommissioned Orient Thai Airlines Boeing 747 (2011)

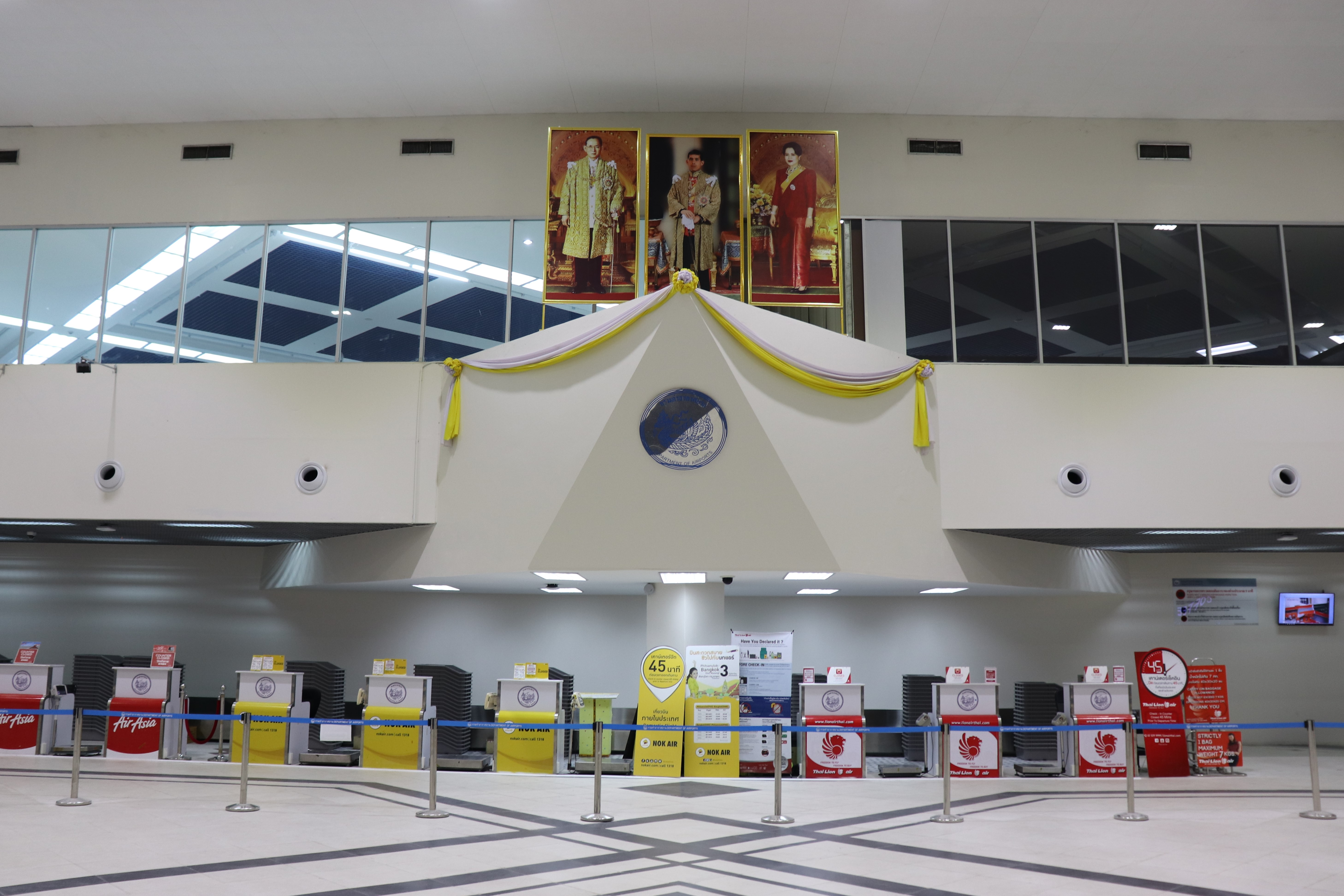
Phitsanulok Airport check in counters (2019)
