= Mae Sot Airport =

Airport in northern Thailand

Mae Sot Airport ท่าอากาศยานแม่สอด
- IATA: MAQ; ICAO: VTPM

Summary
- Airport type: Public
- Operator: Department of Airports
- Serves: Tak
- Location: Tambon Tha Sai Luat, Amphoe Mae Sot, Tak, Thailand
- Opened: 1930; 96 years ago
- Elevation AMSL: 210 m / 690 ft
- Coordinates: 16°41′59″N 098°32′42″E
- Website: minisite.airports.go.th/maesot

Maps
- Location of airport in Thailand
- Interactive map of Mae Sot Airport

Runways
Direction	Length		Surface
Direction	m	ft	Surface
09/27	1,500	4,921	Asphalt

Statistics (2025)
- Passengers: 76,333 ▼25.88%
- Aircraft movements: 1,328 ▼19.66%
- Freight (tonnes): -
- Source: DAFIF

Mae Sot Airport (IATA: MAQ, ICAO: VTPM) is in Tambon Tha Sai Luat, Amphoe Mae Sot, Tak province in Northern Thailand. Currently, it is connected to two domestic destinations. Nok Air started the first international commercial operation from Mae Sot to Yangon in October 2017, but service to Yangon stopped in January 2018. Wisdom Airways started with a 12-seater Cessna Grand Caravan a bi-weekly return flight to Chiang Mai International Airport from Mae Sot (Mondays and Saturdays).

A new passenger terminal opened on 4 April 2019. It will serve 1.7 million passengers / year, instead of 170,000 with the old terminal.

The expansion of Mae Sot's runway was scheduled to be complete in 2019. Thai AirAsia will add the Mae Sot destination soon after Mae Sot's runway expansion is complete and suitable for its Airbus A320 aircraft.

In April 2024, the airport was used to evacuate Myanmar military officials and their families, following a request from Myanmar to extract 617 soldiers and their families after the Siege of Myawaddy.

== Airlines and destinations ==
Airlines	Destinations
Nok Air	Bangkok–Don Mueang
