= Khon Kaen Airport =

Airport in northeastern Thailand

Coordinates: 16°27′59.86″N 102°47′01.18″E

Khon Kaen International Airport ท่าอากาศยานขอนแก่น
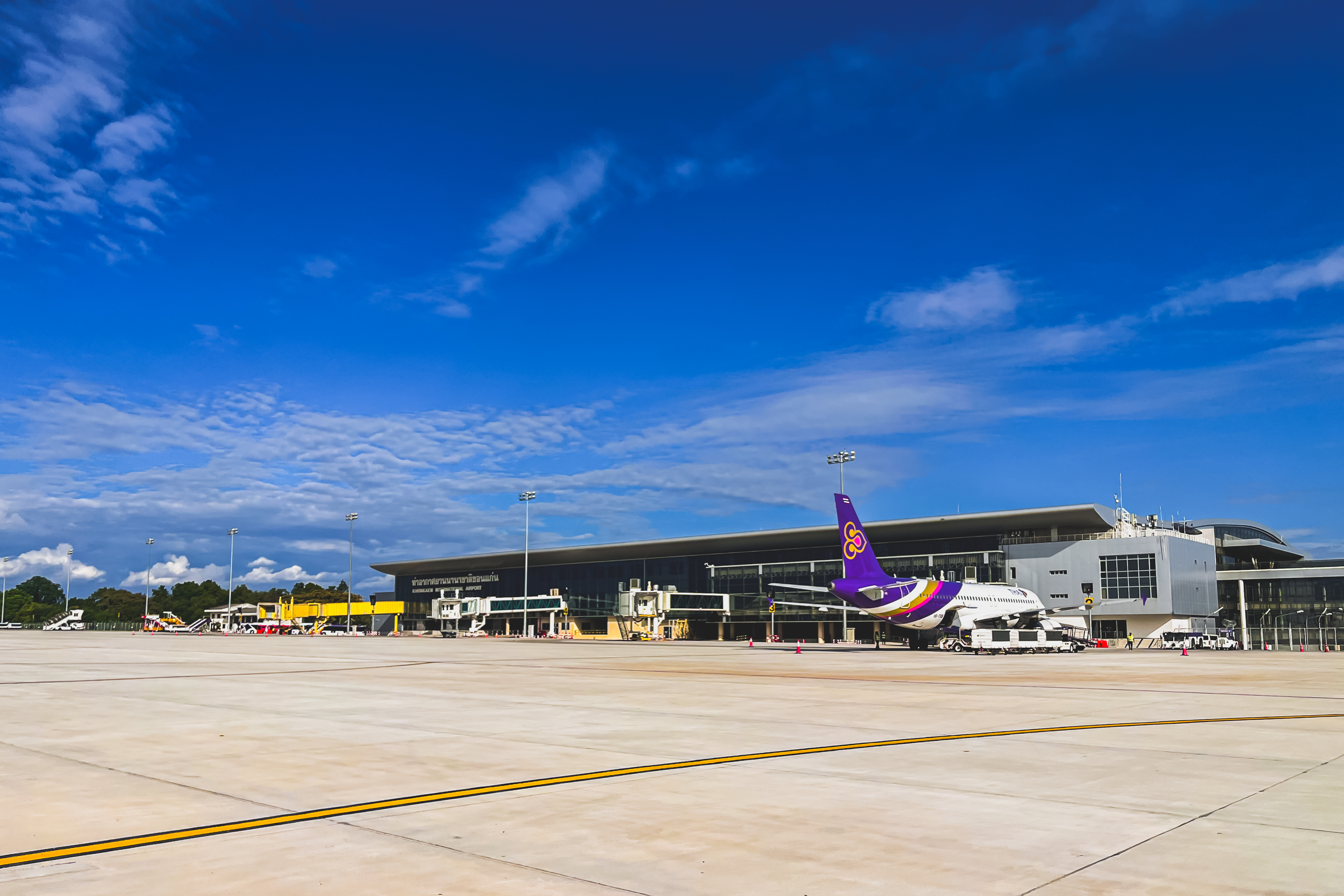
- Current passenger terminal in 2024
- IATA: KKC; ICAO: VTUK

Summary
- Airport type: Public / military
- Owner: Ministry of Transport (Thailand)
- Operator: Department of Airports
- Serves: Khon Kaen, Maha Sarakham Province, Kalasin Province
- Location: Ban Pet, Mueang, Khon Kaen, Thailand
- Opened: 6 February 1963; 63 years ago
- Elevation AMSL: 670 ft (200 m)

Maps
- Location of airport in Thailand
- Interactive map of Khon Kaen International Airport

Runways
Direction	Length		Surface
Direction	ft	m	Surface
03/21	10,007	3,050	Asphalt

Statistics (2025)
- Passengers: 1,705,474 {▲2.25%
- Aircraft movements: 11,444 ▲6.41%
- Freight (tonnes): 369.266 ▼21.94%
- Sources: Department of Airports

Khon Kaen International Airport (IATA: KKC, ICAO: VTUK) is located in Ban Pet subdistrict, Mueang Khon Kaen district, Khon Kaen province in northeastern Thailand. Approximately 8 kilometers west of the city center and 2 kilometers from Highway No. 12 (Khon Kaen - Loei), it covers an area of 1,780,800 square meters and is an airport under the Department of Airports, Ministry of Transport. It was announced as a customs airport on September 1, 1991.

Now, Thai Air Asia has chosen Khon Kaen Airport as the aviation hub of the Northeast. Khon Kaen Airport has accelerated the expansion of the airport, including the passenger terminal, runway, and other parts to support its status as an international airport.

== History ==
Khon Kaen Airport was originally a small airport located in the center of Khon Kaen. It had a laterite runway measuring 30 meters wide and 1,300 meters long. There were no communication devices or navigation aids. The takeoff and landing signals were given by airport officials and green and red flags. When it was safe, the pilots would land the planes.

The government during the time of Sarit Thanarat as Prime Minister saw the importance of developing the Northeast to be as developed as other regions of the country, especially the Northeast. Khon Kaen Province was chosen as the center of the region and as a development center located in the middle of the region. It was convenient to travel to other provinces by car and train in some provinces. However, there was still a lack of air travel, as businesses needed speed and agility. Air travel was therefore necessary and it was deemed appropriate to open commercial flights. Khon Kaen Airport was developed at the original location, but it was not suitable for expansion and improvement. Furthermore, it was located in a residential area, which would prevent the city from expanding. In addition, the province's various government agencies had increased and there was no place to build offices. Therefore, Khon Kaen Province was ordered to find new land to build a new airport to replace the old airport. There was an agreement between the Ministry of Interior and the Ministry of Defense (via the Air Force). In the end, the land, which was public land, was chosen. It is located about 8 kilometers west of the city and is suitable for building an airport.

In 1962, the Civil Aviation Authority, Department of Transport, Ministry of Transport, was the government agency responsible for the construction of the new Khon Kaen Airport. The construction began with the temporary passenger terminal and accommodation building (in the form of a wooden house), a generator hangar, a car park, a 30-meter wide and 1,000-meter long runway, a 60-meter wide and 90-meter long parking apron, and an asphalt paved area.

On February 6, 1963, Thai Airways Company Limited flew a Douglas DC-3 aircraft with 28 passengers on the Bangkok-Khon Kaen-Udon Thani-Nakhon Phanom-Ubon Ratchathani-Bangkok route to operate passenger, cargo, and mail transportation, which was the first route to Khon Kaen Province.

== Terminal and Runway ==
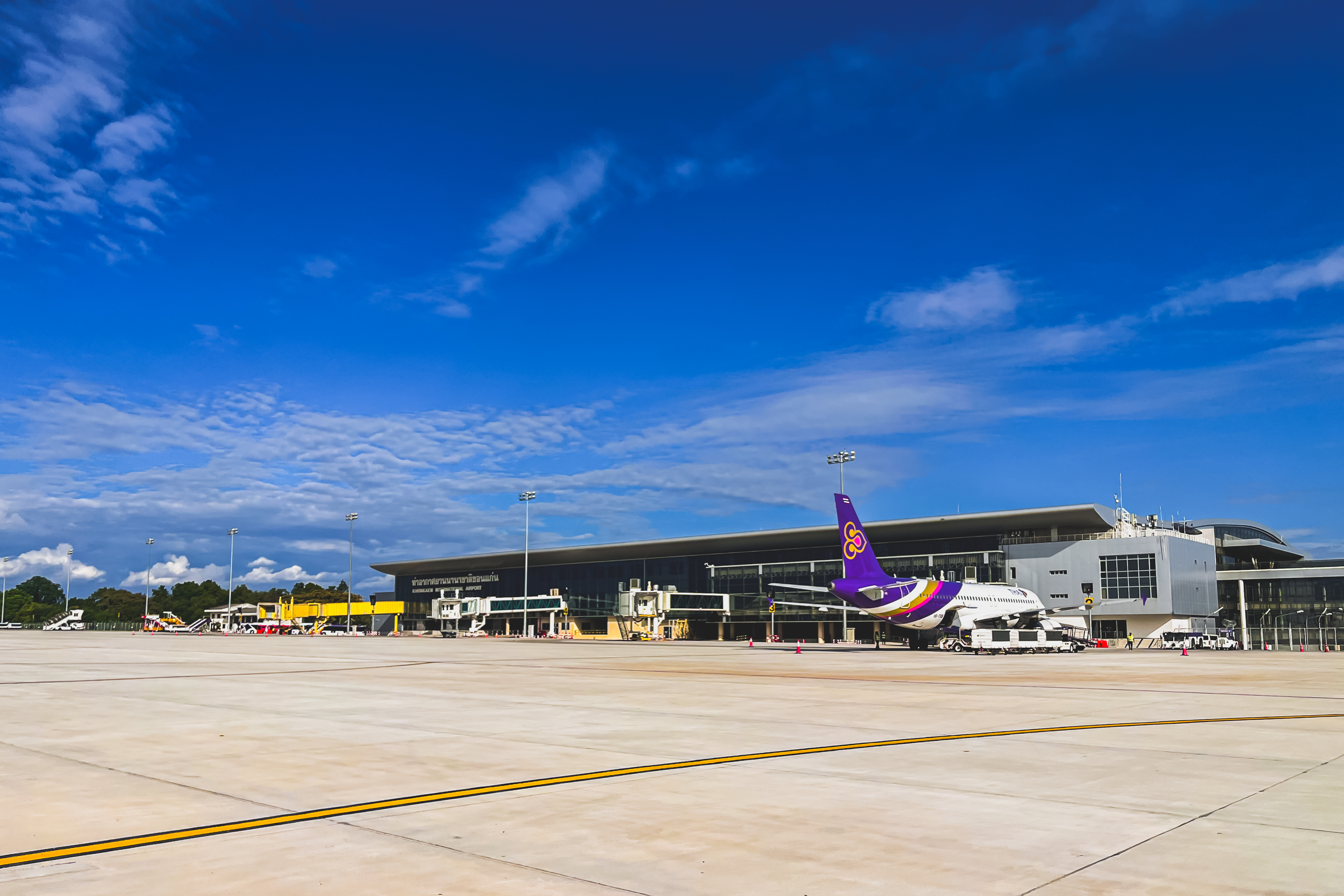
Current passenger terminal of Khon Kaen International Airport

Passenger Terminal

The current passenger terminal of the airport is a 4-storey building with a total usable area of 44,500 square meters. It can accommodate up to 2,500 passengers per hour or approximately 5,000,000 passengers per year The details are as follows.

- G Floor is Food Center and Taxi Meter Service
- 1st Floor is Arrival Terminal consisting of Shops, Tourist Police Service Center, Khon Kaen and Ban Ped Police.
- 2nd Floor is Departure Terminal consisting of Public Relations, Ticket Office, 24 check-in counters, Shops Including the departure hall after checking the boarding pass In addition, there are customs offices, immigration police for international departure passengers.
- 3rd Floor is where airline offices are located. and the office of the Department of Airports.

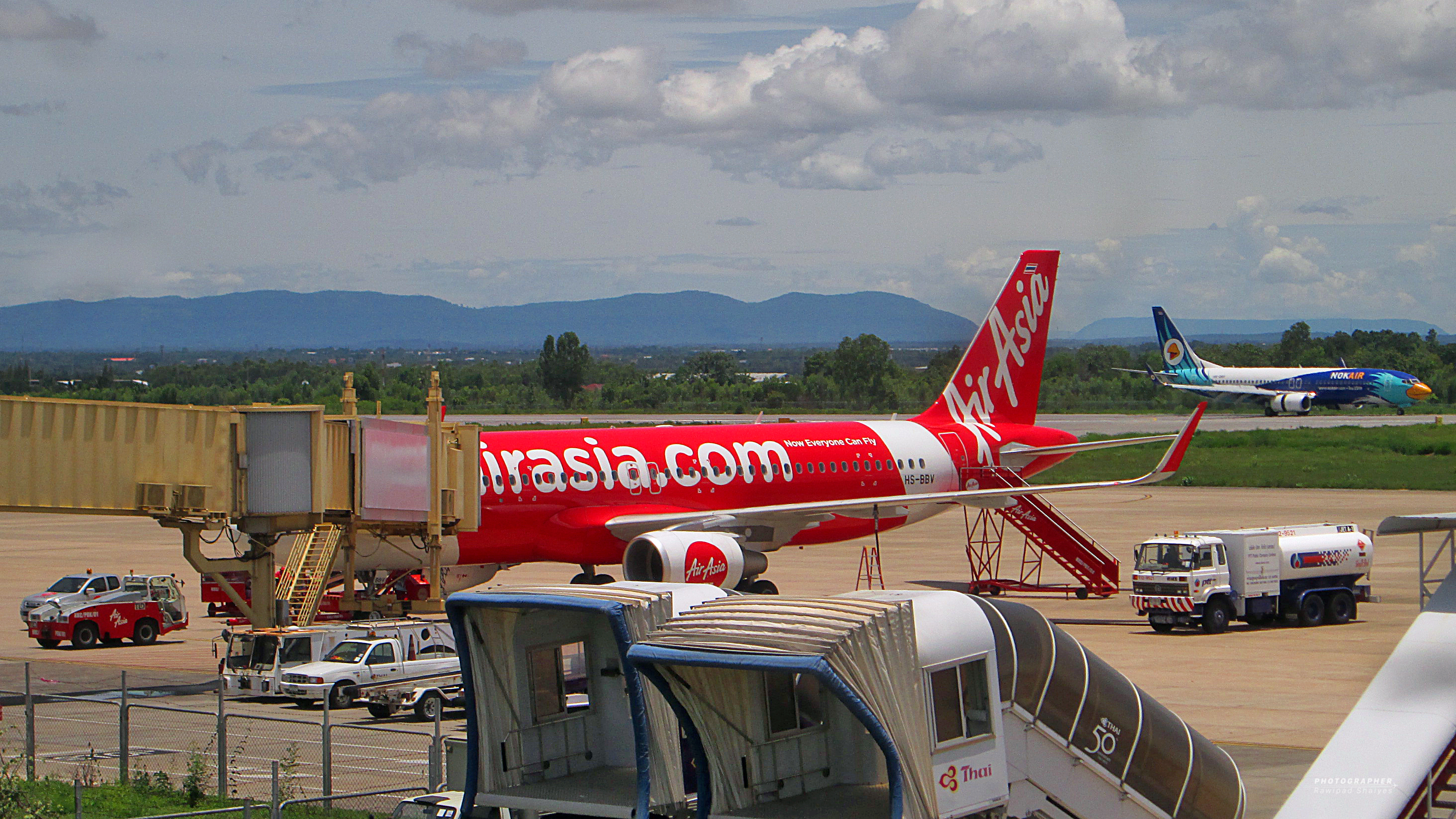
Airbus A320-200 of Thai AirAsia

Runway and Taxiway

- Khon Kaen Airport has 1 runway, 45 meters wide and 3,050 meters long.
- Khon Kaen Airport has 3 taxiways: A, B and C.
- Aircraft parking apron No. 1 (in front of the passenger terminal) is 144 meters wide and 600 meters long, and can park 12 Airbus A320/Boeing 737 aircraft.
- Aircraft parking apron No. 2 (in front of the old building) is 80 meters wide and 180 meters long, and can park 2 Boeing 737-400 aircraft.

== Airlines and destinations ==
Airlines	Destinations
Thai AirAsia	Bangkok–Don Mueang, Bangkok–Suvarnabhumi, Chiang Mai, Phuket
Thai Airways International	Bangkok–Suvarnabhumi
Thai Lion Air	Bangkok–Don Mueang
Thai VietJet Air	Bangkok–Suvarnabhumi

== Airport development plan ==
The airport has seen an annual growth rate of 20 percent annually since 2013, handling around two million passengers in 2017. The Department of Airports (DOA) has signed a memorandum of understanding (MOU) to upgrade Khon Kaen Airport by 2021. The two billion baht project will increase passenger capacity from 2.8 million to five million per year. The terminal will be expanded from 16,500 m^{2} to 44,500 m^{2} to accommodate 1,000–2,000 passengers per hour.

Capacity

When construction is complete, the passenger terminal will be able to accommodate more than 5 million passengers per year, which will increase the capacity to serve commercial flights. Supports large aircraft such as Airbus A330, Boeing 777, as well as medium-sized aircraft such as Airbus A320 and Boeing 737 for international flights. When completed, Khon Kaen Airport will have 4 aircraft bridges, becoming the largest and most modern airport in the Northeast.
