= List of Thai Airways International destinations =

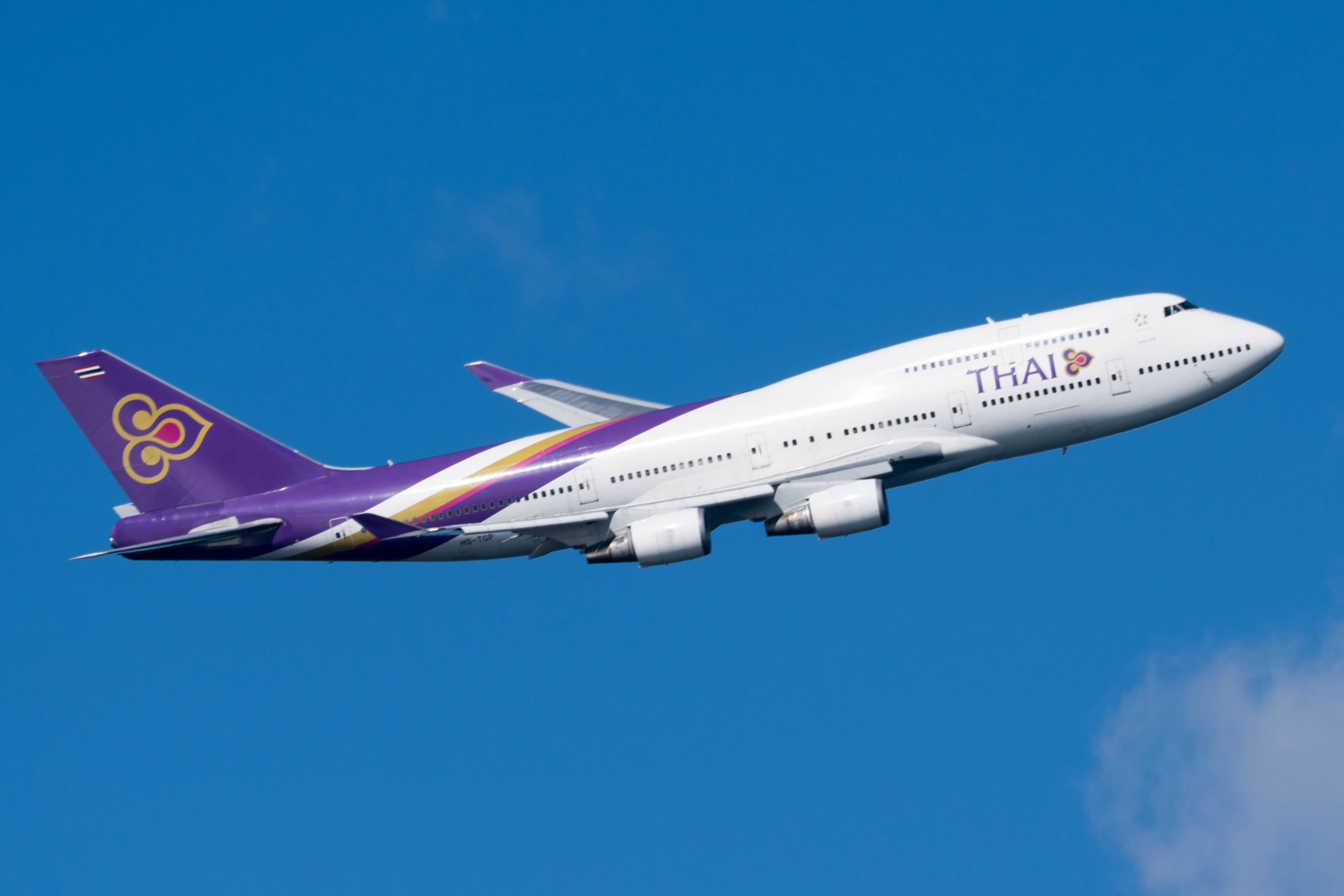
Thai Airways Boeing 747-400 departing Tokyo–Haneda Airport in 2017

Thai Airways International serves a total of 70 destinations (including seasonal and seasonal charter), consisting of 10 domestic destinations within Thailand (including seasonal charter) and 60 international destinations across 31 countries (including seasonal and seasonal charter) from its home base at Suvarnabhumi Airport, Bangkok.

The country with the most international destinations served is India with nine destinations (including seasonal), followed by China with seven destinations, Japan with six destinations, and Australia and Pakistan with three destinations each.

== List ==
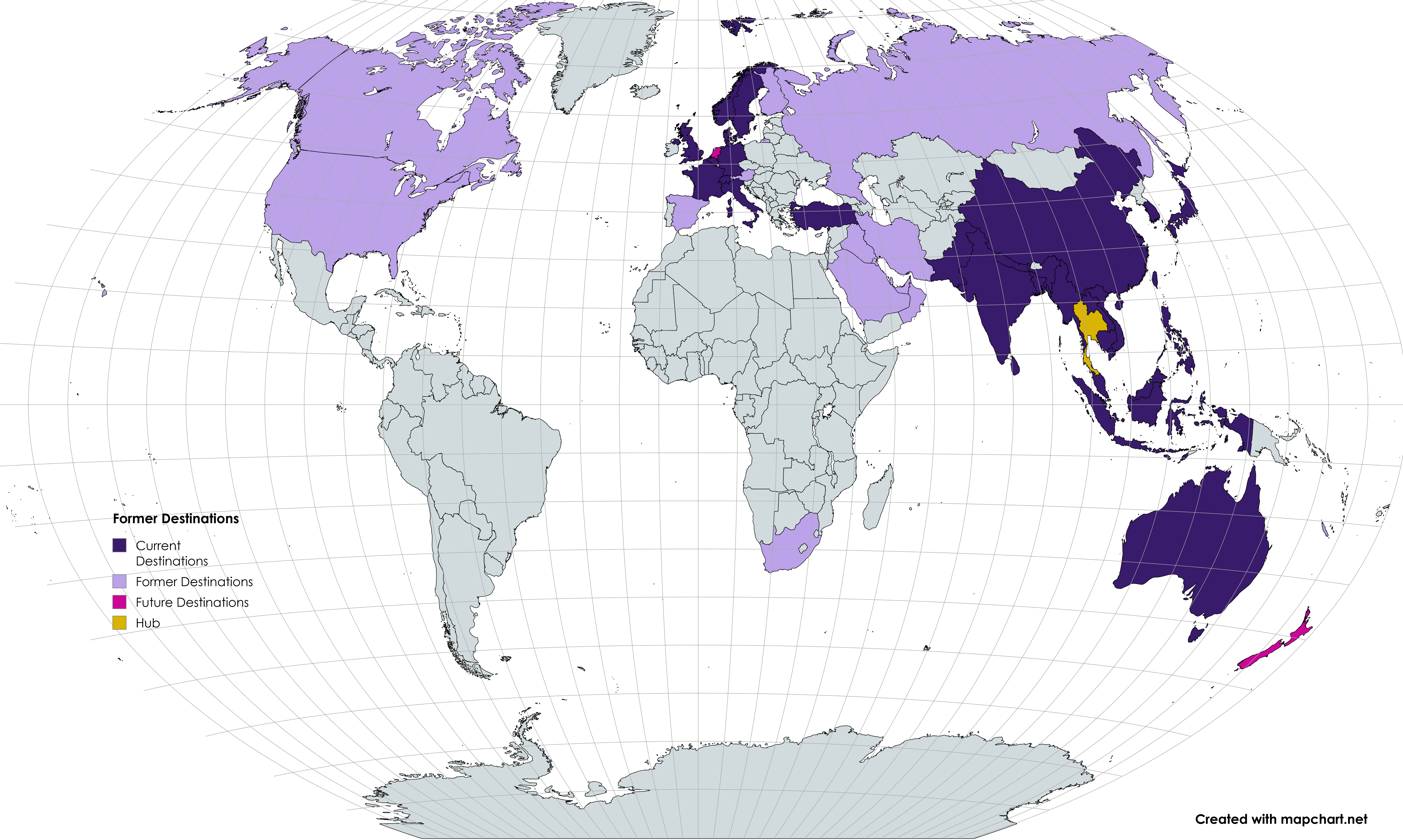
Thai Airways passenger destinations

Country	City	Airport	Notes	Refs
Australia	Brisbane	Brisbane Airport	Terminated	
Australia	Cairns	Cairns Airport	Terminated	
Australia	Melbourne	Melbourne Airport		
Australia	Perth	Perth Airport		
Australia	Sydney	Sydney Airport		
Austria	Vienna	Vienna International Airport	Terminated	
Bahrain	Manama	Bahrain International Airport	Terminated	
Bangladesh	Chittagong	Shah Amanat International Airport	Terminated	
Bangladesh	Dhaka	Hazrat Shahjalal International Airport		
Belgium	Brussels	Brussels Airport		
Brunei	Bandar Seri Begawan	Brunei International Airport	Terminated	
Cambodia	Phnom Penh	Phnom Penh International Airport	Airport closed	
Cambodia	Phnom Penh	Techo International Airport		
Cambodia	Siem Reap	Siem Reap–Angkor International Airport	Seasonal	
Cambodia	Siem Reap	Siem Reap International Airport	Airport closed	
Canada	Toronto	Toronto Pearson International Airport	Terminated	
China	Beijing	Beijing Capital International Airport		
China	Changsha	Changsha Huanghua International Airport		
China	Chengdu	Chengdu Shuangliu International Airport	Terminated	
China	Chengdu	Chengdu Tianfu International Airport		
China	Chongqing	Chongqing Jiangbei International Airport	Resumption announced	
China	Guangzhou	Guangzhou Baiyun International Airport		
China	Guangzhou	Old Guangzhou Baiyun International Airport	Airport closed	
China	Jinghong	Xishuangbanna Gasa International Airport	Terminated	
China	Kunming	Kunming Changshui International Airport		
China	Kunming	Kunming Wujiaba International Airport	Airport closed	
China	Shanghai	Shanghai Hongqiao International Airport	Terminated	
China	Shanghai	Shanghai Pudong International Airport		
China	Shenzhen	Shenzhen Bao'an International Airport	Begins 2026	
China	Wuhan	Wuhan Tianhe International Airport	Begins 2026	
China	Xiamen	Xiamen Gaoqi International Airport		
China	Zhengzhou	Zhengzhou Xinzheng International Airport	Terminated	
Denmark	Copenhagen	Copenhagen Airport		
Finland	Helsinki	Helsinki Airport	Terminated	
France	Paris	Charles de Gaulle Airport		
Germany	Düsseldorf	Düsseldorf Airport	Terminated	
Germany	Frankfurt	Frankfurt Airport		
Germany	Munich	Munich Airport		
Greece	Athens	Athens International Airport	Terminated	
Greece	Athens	Ellinikon International Airport	Airport closed	
Guam	Hagåtña	Antonio B. Won Pat International Airport	Terminated	
Hong Kong	Hong Kong	Hong Kong International Airport		
Hong Kong	Hong Kong	Kai Tak Airport	Airport closed	
India	Ahmedabad	Sardar Vallabhbhai Patel International Airport		
India	Bengaluru	Kempegowda International Airport		
India	Chennai	Chennai International Airport		
India	Delhi	Indira Gandhi International Airport		
India	Gaya	Gaya Airport	Seasonal	
India	Hyderabad	Rajiv Gandhi International Airport		
India	Kochi	Cochin International Airport		
India	Kolkata	Netaji Subhas Chandra Bose International Airport		
India	Mumbai	Chhatrapati Shivaji Maharaj International Airport		
India	Varanasi	Lal Bahadur Shastri International Airport	Terminated	
Indonesia	Denpasar	Ngurah Rai International Airport		
Indonesia	Jakarta	Kemayoran Airport	Airport closed	
Indonesia	Jakarta	Soekarno–Hatta International Airport		
Indonesia	Surabaya	Juanda International Airport	Terminated	
Iran	Tehran	Imam Khomeini International Airport	Terminated	
Iran	Tehran	Mehrabad International Airport	Terminated	
Iraq	Baghdad	Baghdad International Airport	Terminated	
Italy	Milan	Milan Malpensa Airport		
Italy	Rome	Rome Fiumicino Airport	Terminated	
Japan	Fukuoka	Fukuoka Airport		
Japan	Nagoya	Chubu Centrair International Airport		
Japan	Nagoya	Nagoya Komaki Airport	Terminated	
Japan	Osaka	Kansai International Airport		
Japan	Osaka	Itami Airport	Terminated	
Japan	Sapporo	New Chitose Airport		
Japan	Sendai	Sendai Airport	Terminated	
Japan	Tokyo	Haneda Airport		
Japan	Tokyo	Narita International Airport		
Kuwait	Kuwait City	Kuwait International Airport	Terminated	
Laos	Luang Prabang	Luang Prabang International Airport	Terminated	
Laos	Vientiane	Wattay International Airport		
Macau	Macau	Macau International Airport	Terminated	
Malaysia	Kuala Lumpur	Kuala Lumpur International Airport		
Malaysia	Kuala Lumpur	Sultan Abdul Aziz Shah Airport	Terminated	
Malaysia	Kota Kinabalu	Kota Kinabalu International Airport	Terminated	
Malaysia	Langkawi	Langkawi International Airport	Terminated	
Malaysia	Penang	Penang International Airport		
Myanmar	Mandalay	Mandalay International Airport	Terminated	
Myanmar	Yangon	Yangon International Airport		
Nepal	Kathmandu	Tribhuvan International Airport		
Netherlands	Amsterdam	Amsterdam Airport Schiphol		
New Caledonia	Nouméa	La Tontouta International Airport	Terminated	
New Zealand	Auckland	Auckland Airport	Resumption announced	
New Zealand	Christchurch	Christchurch Airport	Terminated	
Norway	Oslo	Oslo Gardermoen Airport		
Oman	Muscat	Muscat International Airport	Terminated	
Pakistan	Islamabad	Benazir Bhutto International Airport	Airport closed	
Pakistan	Islamabad	Islamabad International Airport		
Pakistan	Karachi	Jinnah International Airport		
Pakistan	Lahore	Allama Iqbal International Airport		
Philippines	Manila	Ninoy Aquino International Airport		
Russia	Moscow	Moscow Domodedovo Airport	Terminated	
Saudi Arabia	Dhahran	Dhahran International Airport	Airport closed	
Saudi Arabia	Jeddah	King Abdulaziz International Airport	Terminated	
Saudi Arabia	Medina	Prince Mohammad bin Abdulaziz International Airport	Seasonal charter	
Saudi Arabia	Riyadh	King Khalid International Airport	Terminated	
Singapore	Singapore	Changi Airport		
Singapore	Singapore	Singapore International Airport	Airport closed	
South Africa	Johannesburg	O. R. Tambo International Airport	Terminated	
South Korea	Busan	Gimhae International Airport	Resumes 2026	
South Korea	Seoul	Gimpo International Airport	Terminated	
South Korea	Seoul	Incheon International Airport		
Spain	Barcelona	Josep Tarradellas Barcelona–El Prat Airport	Terminated	
Spain	Madrid	Adolfo Suárez Madrid–Barajas Airport	Terminated	
Sri Lanka	Colombo	Bandaranaike International Airport		
Sweden	Stockholm	Stockholm Arlanda Airport		
Switzerland	Geneva	Geneva Airport	Terminated	
Switzerland	Zurich	Zurich Airport		
Taiwan	Kaohsiung	Kaohsiung International Airport		
Taiwan	Taipei	Songshan Airport	Terminated	
Taiwan	Taipei	Taoyuan International Airport		
Thailand	Bangkok	Don Mueang International Airport	Terminated	
Thailand	Bangkok	Suvarnabhumi Airport	Hub	
Thailand	Buriram	Buriram Airport	Seasonal charter	
Thailand	Chiang Mai	Chiang Mai International Airport	Focus city	
Thailand	Chiang Rai	Chiang Rai International Airport		
Thailand	Hat Yai	Hat Yai International Airport		
Thailand	Khon Kaen	Khon Kaen Airport		
Thailand	Koh Samui	Samui Airport	Terminated	
Thailand	Krabi	Krabi International Airport		
Thailand	Lampang	Lampang Airport	Terminated	
Thailand	Loei	Loei Airport	Terminated	
Thailand	Mae Hong Son	Mae Hong Son Airport	Terminated	
Thailand	Mae Sot	Mae Sot Airport	Terminated	
Thailand	Nakhon Phanom	Nakhon Phanom Airport	Terminated	
Thailand	Nakhon Ratchasima	Nakhon Ratchasima Airport	Terminated	
Thailand	Nakhon Si Thammarat	Nakhon Si Thammarat Airport	Terminated	
Thailand	Nan	Nan Nakhon Airport	Terminated	
Thailand	Narathiwat	Narathiwat Airport	Terminated	
Thailand	Pattani	Pattani Airport	Terminated	
Thailand	Phetchabun	Phetchabun Airport	Airport closed	
Thailand	Phitsanulok	Phitsanulok Airport	Terminated	
Thailand	Phrae	Phrae Airport	Terminated	
Thailand	Phuket	Phuket International Airport	Focus city	
Thailand	Sakon Nakhon	Sakon Nakhon Airport	Terminated	
Thailand	Surat Thani	Surat Thani International Airport	Terminated	
Thailand	Tak	Tak Airport	Airport closed	
Thailand	Trang	Trang Airport	Terminated	
Thailand	Ubon Ratchathani	Ubon Ratchathani Airport		
Thailand	Udon Thani	Udon Thani International Airport		
Turkey	Istanbul	Atatürk Airport	Airport closed	
Turkey	Istanbul	Istanbul Airport		
United Arab Emirates	Dubai	Dubai International Airport	Terminated	
United Kingdom	London	Heathrow Airport		
United States	Dallas	Dallas Fort Worth International Airport	Terminated	
United States	Los Angeles	Los Angeles International Airport	Terminated	
United States	New York City	John F. Kennedy International Airport	Terminated	
United States	Seattle	Seattle–Tacoma International Airport	Terminated	
Vietnam	Da Nang	Da Nang International Airport	Resume 1 December 2026	
Vietnam	Hanoi	Noi Bai International Airport		
Vietnam	Ho Chi Minh City	Tan Son Nhat International Airport		
