= PBair =

Airline of Thailand (1990–2009)

IATA	ICAO	Call sign
9Q	PBA	PEEBEE AIR
- Founded: 1990
- Ceased operations: 21 December 2009
- Hubs: Bangkok–Don Mueang (1990–2006); Bangkok–Suvarnabhumi (2006–2009)
- Frequent-flyer program: Saen Sabai
- Parent company: Boon Rawd Brewery
- Headquarters: Watthana district, Bangkok, Thailand
- Key people: Piya Bhirom Bhakdi

PBair was an airline with its head office in the UBC II Building in Watthana district, Bangkok, Thailand. It operated scheduled domestic and international services. Its main base was Suvarnabhumi Airport. It ceased all operations in December 2009.

== History ==
The airline was founded in 1990 by Piya Bhirom Bhakdi, the president of the Boon Rawd Brewery, the largest in Thailand. It was originally used for flights for brewery staff only. In 1995, it received a license to offer charter flights and started operations in 1997. In February 1999, it started scheduled flights, in alliance with Thai Airways International, Bangkok Airways and Air Andaman. In November 2009 all flights were suspended until further notice. In December 2009 the owner announced that the airline was to be closed for good, and would not restart operations because of huge losses. The closure occurred with the authorities on 21 December 2009.

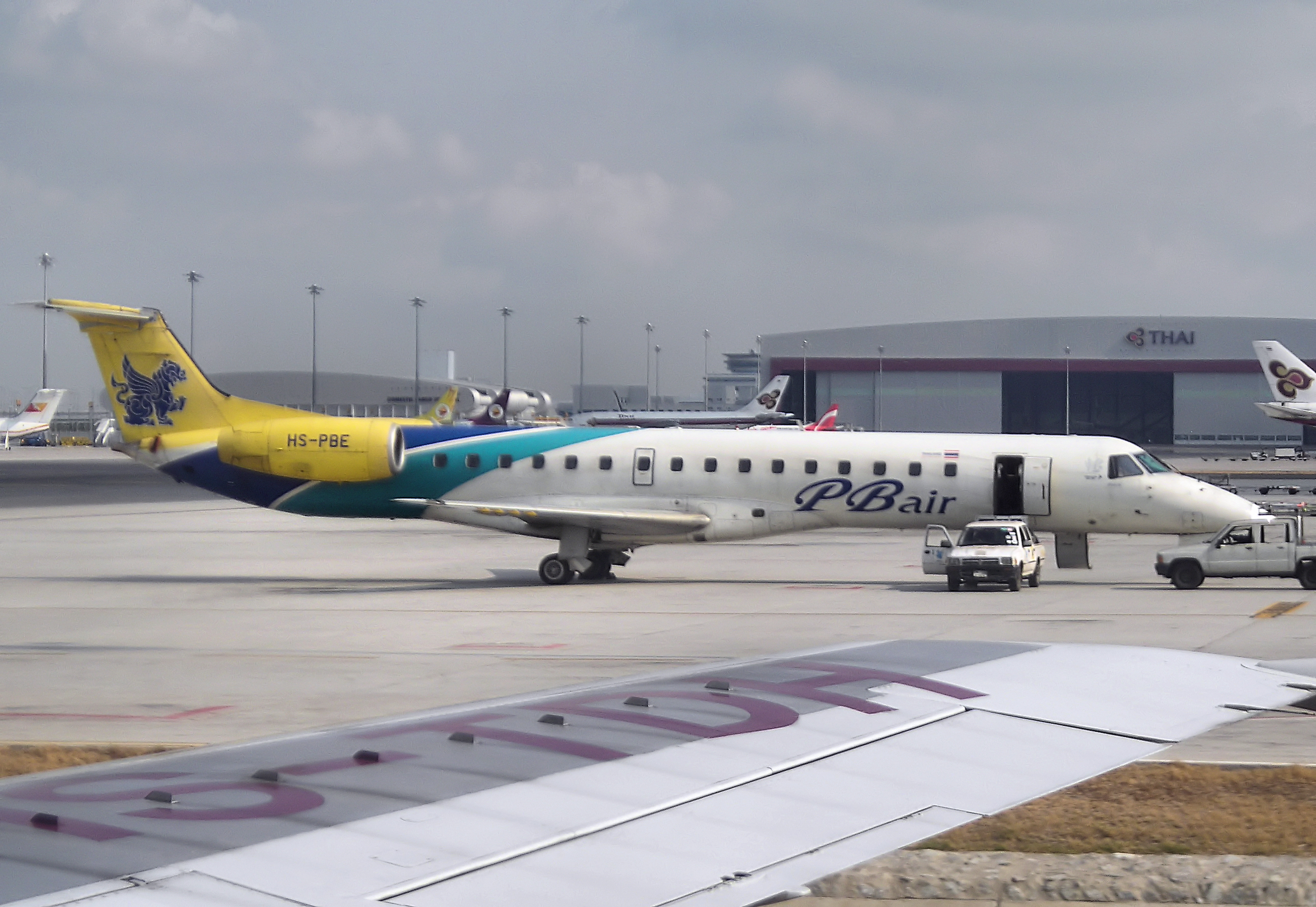
Embraer ERJ 145 at Suvarnabhumi Airport

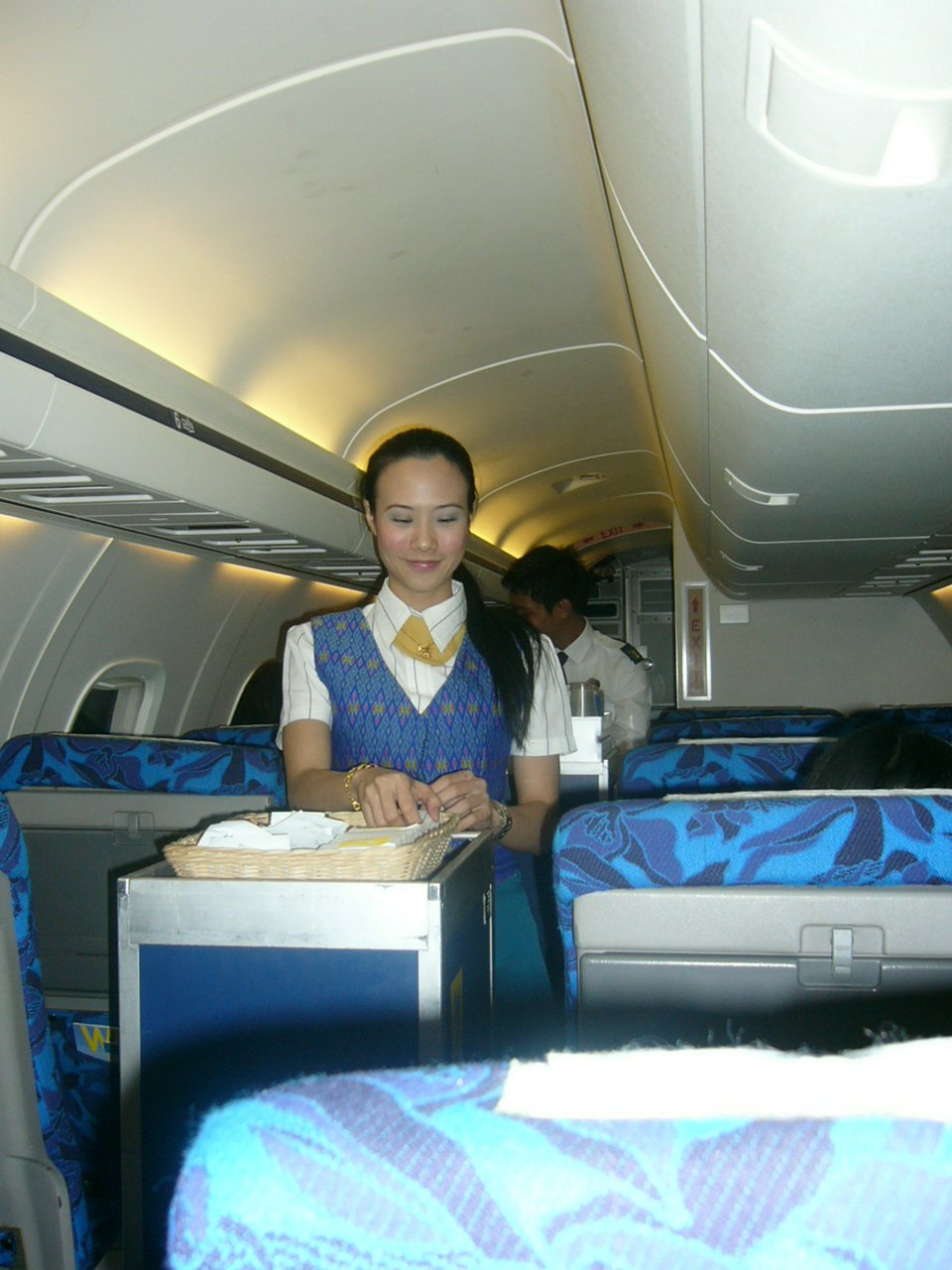
Flight attendant on board an Embraer ERJ 145 LR

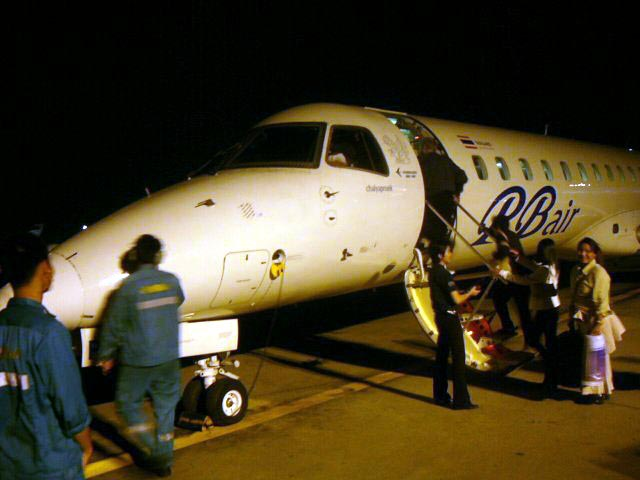
Boarding onto an PBair Embraer ERJ 145 LR in Sakon Nakhon.

== Destinations ==
During its 19-year existence, PBair flew to the following destinations:

Thailand

- Bangkok
  - Don Mueang International Airport
  - Suvarnabhumi Airport
- Buriram – Buriram Airport
- Chiang Mai – Chiang Mai International Airport (codeshare flight with Thai Airways)
- Chiang Rai – Chiang Rai International Airport (codeshare flight with Thai Airways)
- Hat Yai – Hat Yai International Airport (codeshare flight with Thai Airways)
- Khon Kaen – Khon Kaen Airport (codeshare flight with Thai Airways)
- Ko Samui – Samui Airport (codeshare flight with Thai Airways)
- Krabi – Krabi International Airport (codeshare flight with Thai Airways)
- Lampang – Lampang Airport
- Mae Hong Son – Mae Hong Son Airport (codeshare flight with Thai Airways)
- Mae Sot – Mae Sot Airport
- Nakhon Phanom – Nakhon Phanom Airport
- Nan – Nan Nakhon Airport
- Phitsanulok – Phitsanulok Airport (codeshare flight with Thai Airways)
- Phuket – Phuket International Airport (codeshare flight with Thai Airways)
- Roi Et – Roi Et Airport
- Sakon Nakhon – Sakon Nakhon Airport
- Surat Thani – Surat Thani International Airport (codeshare flight with Thai Airways)
- Surin – Surin Bhakdi Airport
- Ubon Ratchathani – Ubon Ratchathani Airport (codeshare flight with Thai Airways)
- Udon Thani – Udon Thani International Airport (codeshare flight with Thai Airways)

Vietnam

- Da Nang – Da Nang International Airport (2007-2009).

=== Codeshare agreements ===
PBair codeshared with the following airlines:

- Thai Airways International

== Fleet ==
During its 19-year existence, PBair operated the following aircraft:

- 2 ATR 72-500 leased from Bangkok Airways
- 1 Boeing 767-300
- 1 Dornier 328
- 2 Embraer ERJ 145 LR
- 3 Fokker F28-4000
