= Airports of Thailand =

Thai airport operator and administrator

Airports of Thailand Public Company Limited

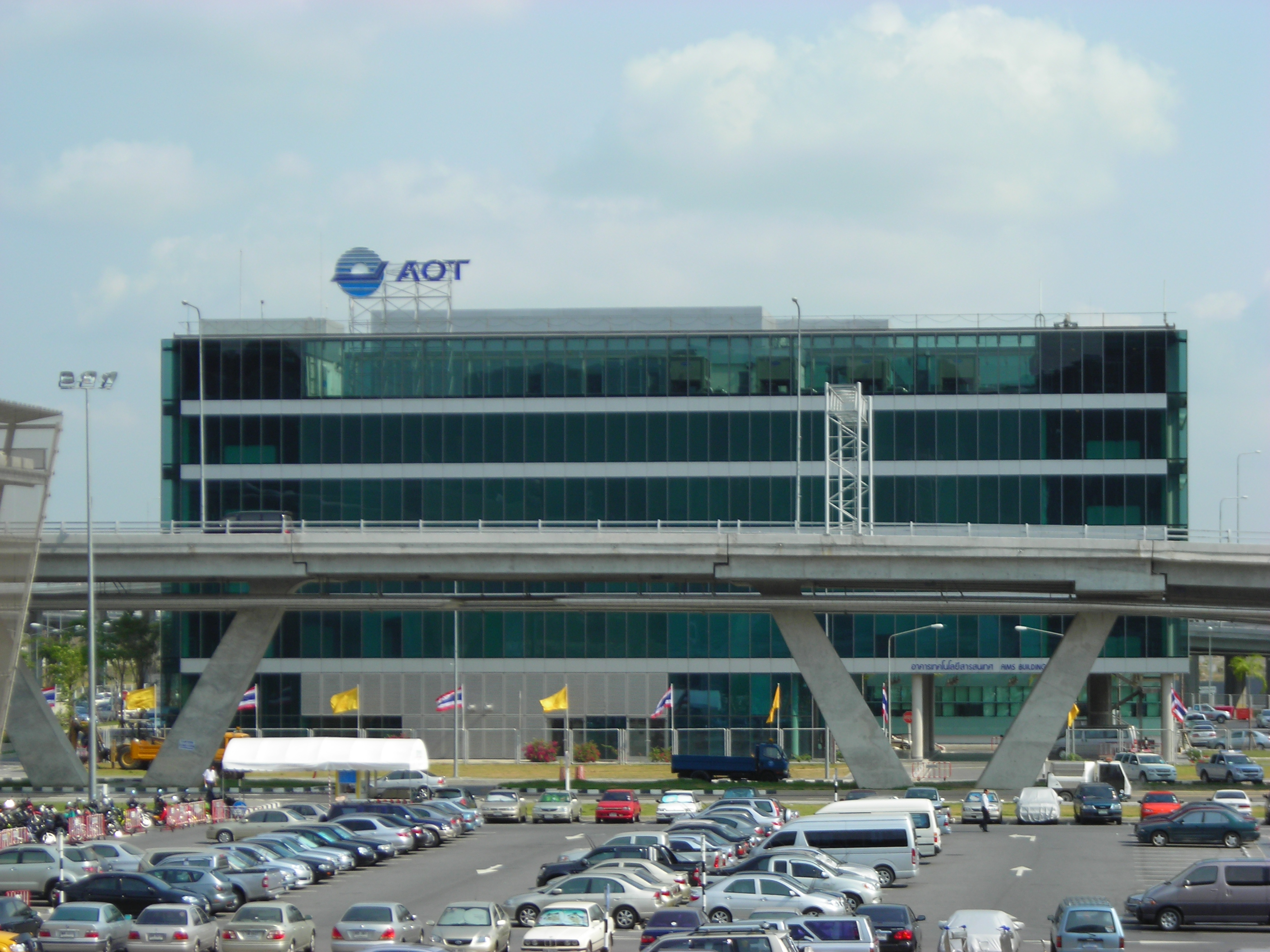
- AOT headquarters, Si Kan, Don Mueang, Bangkok
- Native name: บริษัท ท่าอากาศยานไทย จำกัด (มหาชน)
- Type: Government-owned public
- Traded as: SET: AOT
- ISIN: TH0765010Z08
- Industry: Services
- Founded: 1 July 1979; 47 years ago
- Headquarters: 333 Choet Wutthakat Road, Si Kan, Don Mueang, Bangkok, Thailand
- Key people: Police Gen. Visanu Prasattongosoth (Chairman); Kerati Kijmanawat (President)
- Products: Airport operations and services
- Revenue: ▲64.99 billion baht (FY2019)
- Net income: ▼25.02 billion baht (FY2019)
- Total assets: ▲198.38 billion baht (FY2019)
- Number of employees: 6,044 (2015)
- Website: airportthai.co.th

The Airports of Thailand Public Company Limited (AOT) (Thai: บริษัท ท่าอากาศยานไทย จำกัด (มหาชน)) is a public company that manages ten international airports in Thailand.

AOT was established on September 20, 2002, as a result of the privatisation of the state-owned Airports Authority of Thailand (AOT). At that time, the company was worth 14,285,700,000 baht. The Thai government holds 70% of the company's stock.During fiscal year 2014 AOT's average daily market capitalization was 282,321 million baht.

In 2018, it became the most valuable airport operator in the world. Thailand's 28 regional airports are managed by the Department of Airports, a separate agency.

== History ==
Thai aviation began in 1911 when Belgian pilot, Charles Van Den Born, brought the Orville Wright aircraft to show between February 2–8, 1911 at Sra Pathum Airfield, now known as the Royal Bangkok Sports Club. After that, Thailand took an interest in having airplanes for defense and transportation. They sent three military officers to study aviation in France on February 28, 1911. Those officers were Major Luang Sakdi Sanlayawut (Sunee Suwanprateep), Captain Luang Arwut Sikikorn (Long Sinsuk), and First Lieutenant Tip Ketuthat.

After having completed their training, they returned with eight airplanes in 1913, which the Thai government had ordered. They also tested the airplane's flight performance in front of the Thai people on December 29, 1913, at Sa Pathum Airport. The army planned to build a specific military airfield and hangars. However, because Sa Pathum Airport was constructed in an unsuitable location, The Royal Thai Army Aviation and Aviation School chose a new location based on the conditions of having a spacious area, high ground, no flooding, and away from the Phra Nakhon area. In the end, Don Mueang was chosen for all those requirements instead of Sa Pathum.

The area chosen became Don Mueang Airport. On the morning of March 8, 1914, the airplanes took off from Sa Pathum Airport for the last time and flew into Don Mueang Airport for the first time. The airport was officially opened on March 27, 1914. In 1940, the Air Force established the Civil Aviation Division to carry out operations on international aviation. Eight years later, it was upgraded from a division to a department. They renovated the Don Mueang Airport to be an international airport and changed the official name to "Bangkok Airport" on June 21, 1955. Subsequently, the National Assembly enacted the Act on Airports of Thailand, B.E. 2522, requiring the establishment of an airport authority. The Airport Authority of Thailand, abbreviated as AAT, was formed from the act and began operation on July 1, 1979. As the successor to AAT, Airports of Thailand considers that date its own founding day.

The Sa Pathum airfield, previously used as the main field, was replaced by the Suvarnabhumi Airport on September 28, 2006. During the same time, AOT came to administrate Suvarnabhumi. In the following years, Bangkok Airport's name was changed back to Don Mueang Airport on March 13, 2007. The Suvarnabhumi Airport's buildings and facilities were renovated to increase efficiency and responsiveness to travelers' needs. Suvarnabhumi Airport became one of the main airports in Thailand which has more than 40 million global travelers each year. It serves around eight airlines.

The AOT has expanded to four more international regions, namely Chiang Mai, Hat Yai, Phuket, and Chiang Rai.

== Statistics ==
Thailand's six AOT airports saw growth in passenger traffic of 21.3% in 2015, setting a new record of just under 110 million passengers. Aircraft movements—take-offs and landings—grew in tandem by 16.6% from the previous year to 727,750. The growth was expected to continue through 2016 with AOT projecting an 11% increase in combined passenger throughput. Air freight moved through the airports remained largely stagnant in 2015, with a marginal 0.63% increase to 1.38 million tonnes, reflecting sluggish global trade.

Six years later, around 20 million people traveled through airports in Thailand in 2021. In that year, the number of people on both international and domestic flights decreased from the previous years due to the COVID-19 pandemic. In an attempt to expand the tourism industry and even domestic air transportation, the Thai government recently announced that visitors from low-risk countries can visit Thailand without being quarantined. Currently, Suvarnabhumi Airport in Thailand registered the highest number of total air passengers among other airports, amounting to approximately 14.6 million passengers from October 2021 to July 2022. In that same period, there were around 36 million passengers in all airports in the country.

Total number of air passengers in Thailand from October 2021 to July 2022, by airport
Characteristic	Number of passengers in millions
Suvarnabhumi	14.62
Don Mueang	9.2
Phuket	4.57
Chiang Mai	3.44
Hat Yai	2.04
Chiang Rai	1.22

== Plans ==
In the past, Thailand had no plans for airport development planning, thus unable to meet the demand to its full potential. The current plans for improving current airports and constructing new ones involved dividing Thai airports into four groups. On 23 November 2024, AOT's board of directors announced to the Stock Exchange of Thailand that they have agreed to pay 193.08 million baht to King Power Suvarnabhumi Ltd. to acquire the land area for the expansion of the eastern passenger terminal of the Suvarnabhumi Airport, also known as the East Expansion project.

Airport group	Definition	Airports	Passengers
Primary Hub Airports	Located in a very large city area.; Mainly long-distance international connections to the main international hub.	Suvarnabhumi, Don Mueang.	More than 25 million passengers per year.
Secondary Hub Airports	Located in a large city area.; Both domestic and short-distance, medium and long-distance international flights, but lower than the main center.	Chiang Mai, Phuket.	Between 5-25 million passengers per year.
Regional Airports	Located in a large urban area for the needs of air travel in the province and in that region.; Mainly domestic flights, with some limited international short- and medium-haul routes, primarily serving neighboring countries.	Krabi, Hat Yai, Udon Thani, Surat Thani, Samui, Chiang Rai, Khon Kaen, Ubon Ratchathani, Nakhon Si Thammarat.	Between 1-5 million passengers per year.
Local Airports	Located in a provincial area to meet the air travel needs of the population in a particular province or area.; Mainly domestic flight service.	Trang, Phitsanulok, Sakon Nakhon, Nan Nakhon, Nakhon Phanom, Roi Et, Lampang, Loei, Narathiwat, Mae Sot, U-Tapao, Buriram, Chumphon, Ranong, Trat, Sukhothai, Phrae, Mae Hong Son, Hua Hin, Pai, Phrae, Phetchabun, Nakhon Ratchasima, Tak, Mae Sariang.	Less than 1 million passengers per year.

== Strategic goal ==
The vision "Airport System Connecting and Driving the Development of the Country" sets out the vision and strategic goals for the 20-year development in line with the 20-year national strategy formulated by the government.

Strategic objectives	Objective
Safety & security	The rate of accidents and incidents in airports must not increase.; The rate of security standards violation must not increase.
Accessibility	80% of the country's population should have access to airports with domestic flights connecting to the main hub airport, and secondary hub airport.; Regional airports can be reached by road and or train in 90 minutes.
Connectivity	The airport must integrate the development of other modes of transport with the airport air transport service.
Service quality	Airports must have the capability to provide and develop services in accordance with the needs and expectations of service users.
Operational efficiency	Airports must be able to operate efficiently with cost-effective use of resources.
Sustainability	Airports must be able to develop and maintain a balance of airport operations and development in three main dimensions: social, economic, and environmental.

In order to provide a clear and continuous long-term development direction, the development target is set in four phases.

=== Phase 1 (2017 - 2021) ===
Improve the airports' capacity to handle air traffic and transport to meet both short and long-term needs, and reduce air traffic congestion.

=== Phase 2 (2022 - 2026) ===
Create a mechanism that promotes airport business' competitiveness, encouraging airport operators at all levels to focus on operating development.

=== Phase 3 (2027 - 2031) ===
Development initiatives focused on innovation and operational improvement within the airport industry.

=== Phase 4 (2032 - 2036) ===
Development goals that place emphasis on improving the sustainability of airports. Balancing social, economic and environmental development.
