= Nok Air =

Low-cost airline of Thailand

Nok Airlines plc บริษัท สายการบินนกแอร์ จำกัด (มหาชน)

- A Boeing 737 of Nok Air
IATA	ICAO	Call sign
DD	NOK	NOK AIR
- Founded: 10 February 2004; 22 years ago
- Commenced operations: 23 July 2004; 22 years ago
- AOC #: AOC.0006
- Operating bases: Bangkok–Don Mueang; Chiang Mai; Phuket
- Frequent-flyer program: Nok Fan Club
- Fleet size: 14
- Destinations: 18
- Parent company: Thai Airways International (8.91%)
- Traded as: SET: NOK
- Headquarters: 222 Vibhavadi Rangsit Road, Sanambin, Don Mueang, Bangkok, Thailand
- Key people: Phichit Sathapattayanon (CEO)
- Founder: Patee Sarasin
- Revenue: ▲12,312.93 million baht (2014)
- Net income: ▼ -471.66 million baht (2014)
- Total assets: ▲6,569.00 million baht (2014)
- Total equity: ▼3,771.12 million baht (2014)
- Website: www.nokair.com

Nok Airlines plc, trading as Nok Air (SET: NOK; Thai: บริษัท สายการบินนกแอร์ จำกัด (มหาชน), from nok [นก] meaning 'bird') is a low-cost airline in Thailand operating mostly domestic services from Bangkok's Don Mueang International Airport.

== History ==
Nok Air was established in February 2004 as Sky Asia Co. Ltd. and started operations on 23 July 2004. As of March 2007, it had 130 employees and had reached around 1,400 employees by 2014. Nok Air began its first international service on 31 May 2007, with daily flights to Bangalore, India, but suspended these in 2020.

Nok Air serves the largest number of domestic routes within Thailand, with 24 routes.

Nok Air operates largely independently from Thai Airways, which has caused some friction between the two companies. To gain greater control of Nok Air, Thai Airways has tried to purchase the shares of other shareholders, notably Krungthai Bank. Although Thai Airways and Krungthai Bank are both state enterprises under the control of the finance ministry, Krungthai Bank refused to sell its shares in Nok Air to Thai Airways. The purchase would have lifted Thai Airways' stake in Nok Air from 39 to 49%. Evidence of Thai Airways' declining interest in Nok Air came in May 2017, when Thai Airways shareholding was diluted to 21.57% as a result of not taking up their entitlement to a new share offering. As a consequence, Thai investor Nuttapol Chulangkul became the airline's largest shareholder, owning 23.77% of the company.

Due to the preparation process to be listed on the Stock Exchange of Thailand (SET), the company name was changed to "Nok Airlines Company Limited" on 16 January 2006. Then, at its initial entry to Thailand's stock market, it was renamed "Nok Airlines Public Company Limited" (since 18 January 2013) with the trading symbol "NOK".

In late 2013, Nok Air announced a joint venture with Scoot (a low-cost subsidiary of Singapore Airlines) to form NokScoot, a low-cost airline operating medium-to long-haul international services, based at Don Mueang Airport in Bangkok. The joint venture was shut down in 2020 as a result of the COVID-19 pandemic.

A new company slogan, "Smiling Across Asia" was unveiled in June 2016. It hints at Nok's strategy of becoming the dominant regional carrier.

On 22 December 2017, Patee Sarasin, the first Nok Air CEO (between 2004 and 2017), resigned from the company's board of directors.

=== Restructuring ===
In February 2016, Nok Air cancelled numerous flights and issued several contradictory stories to explain the cancellations. On 14 February 2016, a work stoppage was caused by about 10 pilots, which was followed by the resignation of 17 pilots. On 25 February, several flight cancellations were announced, resulting in a loss of trust from the airline's customers.

There are issues of dissension between Nok Air management and cockpit staff, charges of nepotism and questions about pilot loyalty. In its 2015 financial report released on 26 February, the airline acknowledged that the turnover of cockpit staff had exceeded the normal rate, well beyond expectations. There are just under 200 pilots working at Nok Air, considered too few for the scale of its operations.

The problem arose after Thailand tightened its aviation standards to comply with the European Aviation Safety Agency, disqualifying some pilots, Patee Sarasin, Nok Air CEO at that time, told local media. Thailand is under pressure to improve its aviation standards after US authorities downgraded the country's aviation safety rating in December 2015.

To remedy its shortage of pilots, Nok may be permitted to boost the number of its foreign pilots beyond the 40 per cent cap mandated by Thai law according to Transport Minister Arkhom Termpittayapaisith. The 40 per cent pilot quota is set by the Civil Aviation Authority of Thailand (CAAT), which aims to encourage airlines to employ more Thais as pilots. Pilots, according to the Labour Ministry, are on the list of 39 jobs where Thai nationals are preferred, jobs ranging from barbers and secretaries to certain fields of engineering. Nok in February hired 32 new pilots, bringing their total to 212.

On 30 July 2020, Nok Air filed for bankruptcy.

Nok Air was delisted from the Thai Stock Exchange on 9 January 2025, following a final seven-day window for its trading operations from 27 December 2024 to 8 January 2025.

== Destinations ==
As of November 2024, Nok Air flies (or has flown) to the following destinations:

Country	City	Airport	Notes	Refs
China	Changsha	Changsha Huanghua International Airport	Terminated	
China	Chengdu	Chengdu Tianfu International Airport		
China	Nanning	Nanning Wuxu International Airport		
China	Nanjing	Nanjing Lukou International Airport		
China	Nantong	Nantong Xingdong International Airport	Terminated	
China	Yancheng	Yancheng Nanyang International Airport	Terminated	
China	Zhengzhou	Zhengzhou Xinzheng International Airport		
India	Bengaluru	Kempegowda International Airport	Terminated	
India	Guwahati	Lokpriya Gopinath Bordoloi International Airport	Terminated	
India	Hyderabad	Rajiv Gandhi International Airport		
India	Mumbai	Chhatrapati Shivaji Maharaj International Airport		
Japan	Hiroshima	Hiroshima Airport	Terminated	
Laos	Vientiane	Wattay International Airport	Terminated	
Myanmar	Yangon	Yangon International Airport	Terminated	
Thailand	Bangkok	Don Mueang International Airport	Base	
Thailand	Betong	Betong Airport	Terminated	
Thailand	Buriram	Buriram Airport	Terminated	
Thailand	Chiang Mai	Chiang Mai International Airport	Base	
Thailand	Chiang Rai	Chiang Rai International Airport		
Thailand	Chumphon (Pathio)	Chumphon Airport		
Thailand	Hat Yai	Hat Yai International Airport		
Thailand	Khon Kaen	Khon Kaen Airport	Terminated	
Thailand	Krabi	Krabi International Airport		
Thailand	Lampang	Lampang Airport	Terminated	
Thailand	Loei	Loei Airport	Terminated	
Thailand	Mae Hong Son	Mae Hong Son Airport	Terminated	
Thailand	Mae Sot	Mae Sot Airport		
Thailand	Nakhon Phanom	Nakhon Phanom Airport	Terminated	
Thailand	Nakhon Si Thammarat	Nakhon Si Thammarat Airport		
Thailand	Nan	Nan Nakhon Airport		
Thailand	Phetchabun	Phetchabun Airport	Terminated	
Thailand	Phitsanulok	Phitsanulok Airport		
Thailand	Phrae	Phrae Airport	Terminated	
Thailand	Phuket	Phuket International Airport	Base	
Thailand	Ranong	Ranong Airport	Terminated	
Thailand	Roi Et	Roi Et Airport	Terminated	
Thailand	Sakon Nakhon	Sakon Nakhon Airport		
Thailand	Surat Thani	Surat Thani International Airport		
Thailand	Trang	Trang Airport		
Thailand	Ubon Ratchathani	Ubon Ratchathani Airport		
Thailand	Udon Thani	Udon Thani International Airport		
Vietnam	Hanoi	Noi Bai International Airport	Terminated	
Vietnam	Ho Chi Minh City	Tan Son Nhat International Airport	Terminated	

=== Miscellaneous ===
Nok Air also offers ferry services to domestic island destinations as well as domestic and cross border coach services to Vientiane and Pakse in Laos in conjunction with other tour operators.

Nok Air is known for their "beak" logo and livery, which includes a stylized bird's beak on the nose of the plane.

== Fleet ==
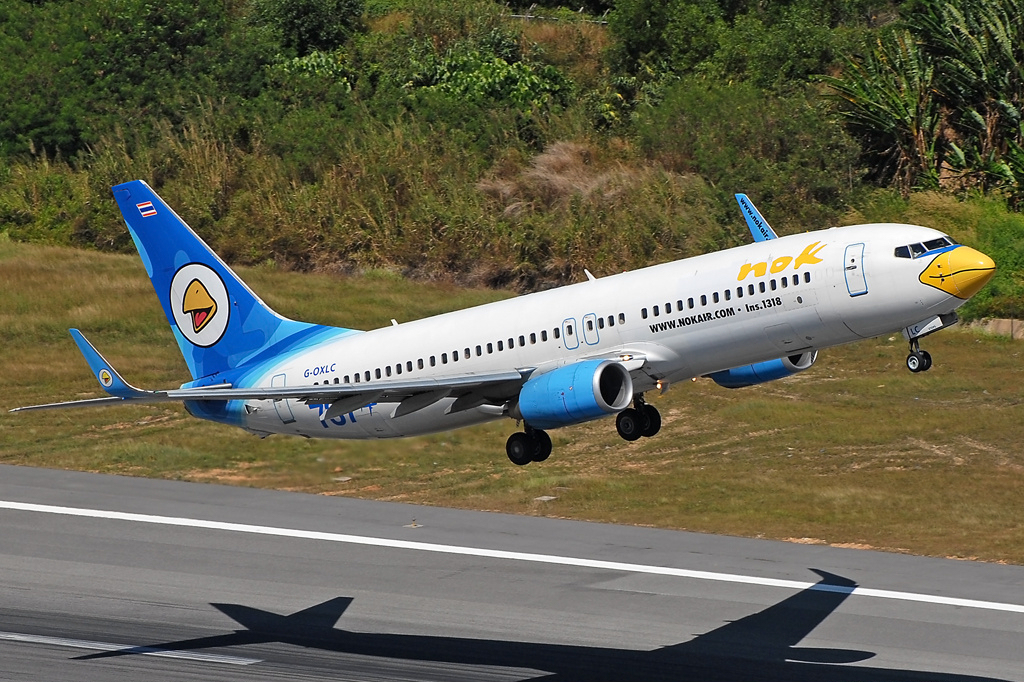
Nok Air Boeing 737-800, Phuket International Airport

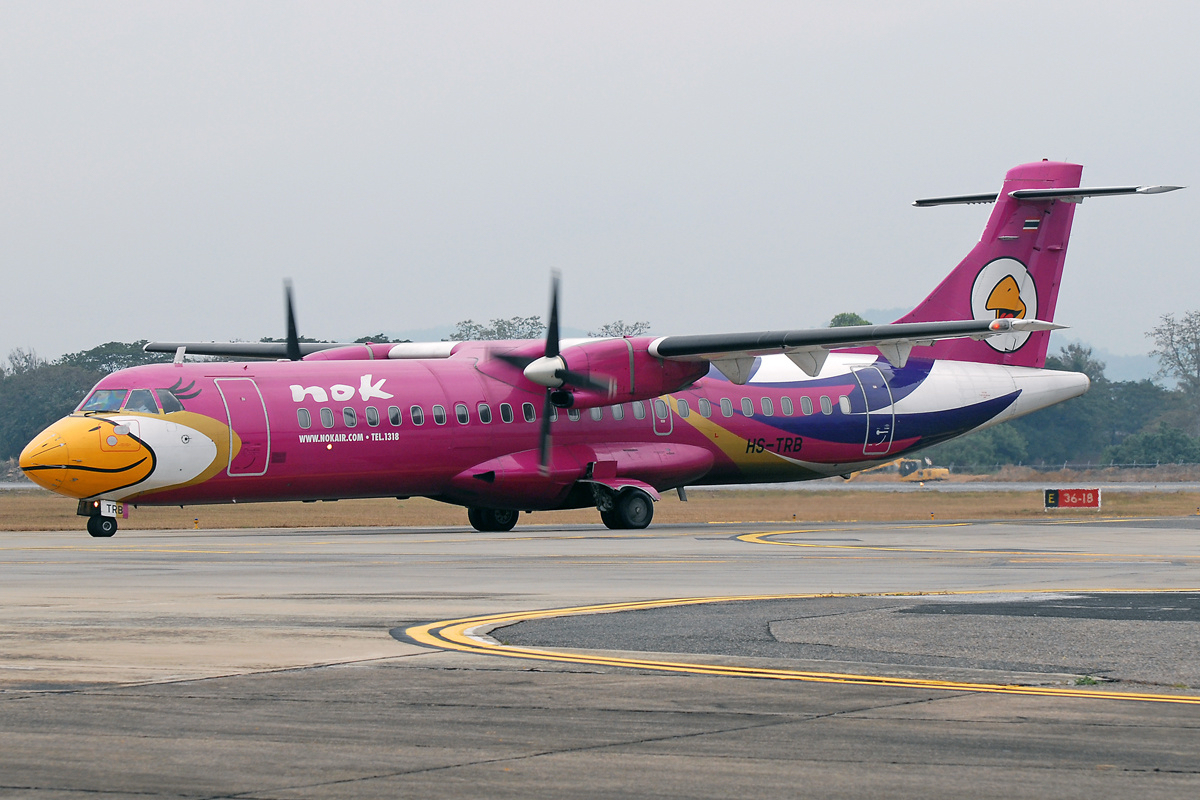
Nok Air ATR 72-200 at Chiang Mai International Airport

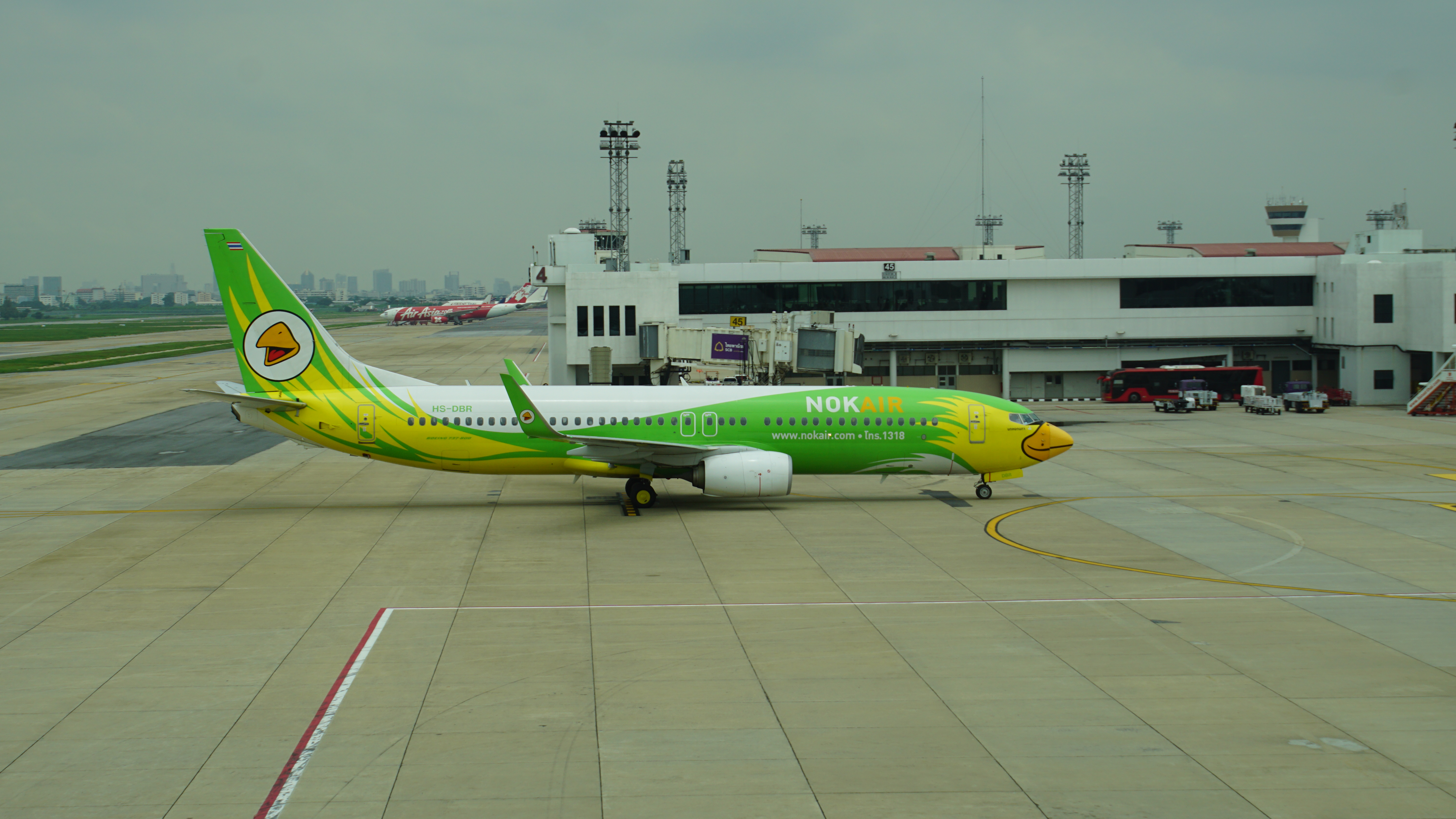
Nok Air Boeing 737-800 at Don Mueang International Airport

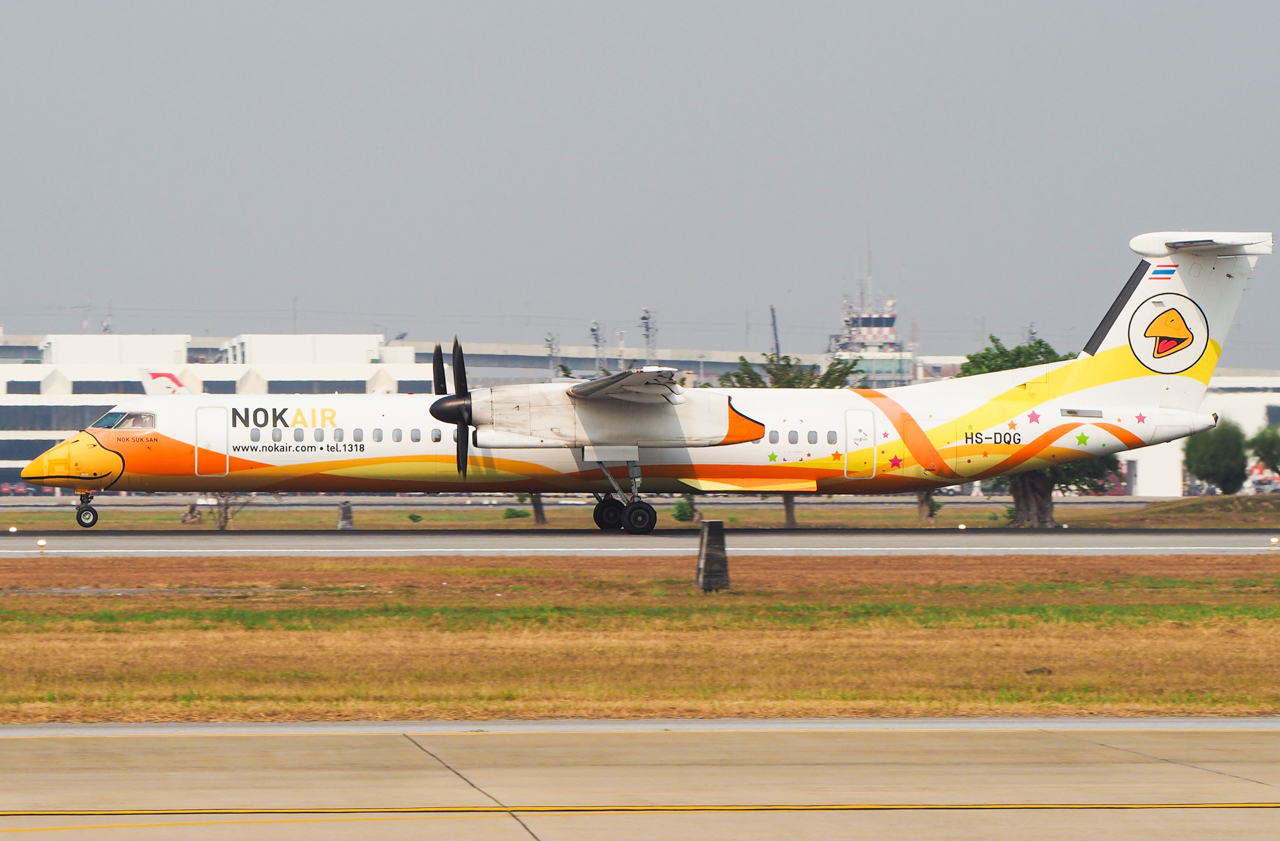
Nok Air Bombardier Dash 8 Q400 NextGen at Don Mueang International Airport

=== Current fleet ===
As of August 2025, Nok Air operates the following aircraft:

Nok Air fleet
Aircraft	In service	Orders	Passengers	Notes
Boeing 737-800	10	—	189	
Boeing 737 MAX 8		6		Estimated delivery about 3-4 years
Total	10	6		

== Major shareholders ==
Major shareholders (as of 15 March 2019)	% of shares owned
Nuttapol Jurangkool	24.33%
Hathairatn Jurangkool	22.15%
Thaveechat Jurangkool	20.94%
Thai Airways International	15.94%
Tham Chirathivatt	0.37%
Patee Sarasin	0.37%

== Partnerships ==
Nok Air a long-term partnership with Sabre and its subsidiary company.

== See also ==
- NokScoot
- Nok Mini
