= Kerati Kijmanawat =

Thai businessman

- กีรติ กิจมานะวัฒน์
- Education: Sirindhorn International Institute of Technology (BEng); University of Tokyo (MEng, DEng)

Kerati Kijmanawat (Thai: กีรติ กิจมานะวัฒน์) is a Thai businessman and President of Airports of Thailand (AOT), a government owned public company.

== Career ==
Kerati is overseeing a $4.8 billion expansion of airports in Bangkok to accommodate a surge in post-pandemic tourism. At Suvarnabhumi Airport, this includes two new runways, a new terminal, and expanding the existing passenger terminal to increase annual capacity from 60 million in 2024 to 135 million by 2030. At Don Mueang Airport, a new terminal for international passengers and a renovation of the existing terminal will increase capacity from 30 million passengers in 2024 to 50 million by 2030.

In June 2024, Kerati announced the creation of a new subsidiary of AOT to operate small airports in Thailand, taking over from the Department of Airports. The first airports to be handed over will be Krabi, Buriram, and Udon Thani.

Kerati oversaw over the completion of the SAT1 terminal at Suvarnabhumi Airport in March 2025, in advance of its official opening by King Maha Vajiralongkorn on 20 March.
