= Visanu Prasattongosoth =

Visanu Prasattongosoth (พลตำรวจเอก วิสนุ ปราสาททองโอสถ) (born 25 November 1962) is a Thai police general and corporate director. He has held senior positions in the Royal Thai Police and served on the boards of several Thai public companies.

== Career ==
Visanu Prasattongosoth began his professional career in the Royal Thai Police, where he held a number of positions in police administration and command. He subsequently served as Commissioner of the Office of Human Resources and later as Assistant Commissioner General. He was appointed Inspector General of the Royal Thai Police in 2020 and remained in the position until his retirement in 2023.

Since his retirement from the Royal Thai Police in 2023, Prasattongosoth served as an independent director or director of several Thai publicly listed companies, including Finansia X, BCPG and Vanachai Group. He had also previously served on the board of Bangkok Airways.

In November 2023, Prasattongosoth was appointed chairman of the board of Airports of Thailand (AOT), succeeding Sarawut Songsiwilai. AOT operates Thailand's principal international airports, including Suvarnabhumi Airport and Don Mueang International Airport.

Prasattongosoth served as chairman of Airports of Thailand until January 2025. He subsequently continued to hold directorships in the Thai corporate sector.

== Finansia X Investigation ==
In October 2025, Visanu Prasattongosoth was the subject of an investigative report concerning his role at Thai investment Bank Finansia X. The report questioned his oversight of the company and alleged that he had accepted bribes in exchange for using his position and influence to assist with improper requests from government officials and businessmen. It also reported that he did not respond to questions from the publication.

The controversy continued after the publication of the report, the company executives were invited to provide information to parliamentary committees examining allegations involving transnational scam networks and money laundering. The company declined to attend the meeting.
