= PHY (disambiguation) =

PHY is an abbreviation for the physical layer of the OSI model and refers to the circuitry required to implement physical layer functions.

PHY or Phy may also refer to:

- Phy, the drug methadone
- Phetchabun Airport (IATA code), Thailand

== See also ==
- Physics
