= Surin Airport =

Airport in northeastern Thailand

Surin Bhakdi Airport ท่าอากาศยานสุรินทร์ภักดี
- IATA: PXR; ICAO: VTUJ

Summary
- Airport type: Public
- Owner: Surin Provincial Administrative Organisation
- Operator: Department of Airports; Royal Thai Army
- Serves: Surin
- Location: Nok Mueang, Mueang, Surin, Thailand
- Coordinates: 14°51′59″N 103°30′00″E

Map

Surin Bhakdi Airport (IATA: PXR, ICAO: VTUJ) is in Nok Mueang subdistrict, Mueang Surin district, Surin province in northeastern Thailand, 450 kilometers from Bangkok and 50 kilometers from the Cambodian border. It is the only airport in Thailand to be owned by a local government, i.e., the Surin Provincial Administrative Organisation, and is operated by Department of Airports.

The airport was open from 2002 to 2003 when the now defunct Air Andaman was the sole airline operating there, and reopened in 2013. The airport was briefly served by Nok Air. As of January 2020, there is no scheduled airline service at the airport. Nok Air now offers air service to Buriram Airport with a bus connection to Surin.
