= 2Y =

2Y or 2-Y may refer to:

- 2Y, IATA code for Air Andaman
- 2Y, one of several models of Toyota Y engine

== See also ==
- Y2 (disambiguation)
