= Air Nepal International =

IATA	ICAO	Call sign
SZ	NPL	AIR NEPAL
- Founded: 24 July 2005
- Ceased operations: March 2006
- AOC #: 022/08
- Hubs: Tribhuvan International Airport
- Fleet size: 1 (at closure)
- Destinations: 5 (at closure)
- Headquarters: Kathmandu, Nepal

Air Nepal International was an airline based in Kathmandu, Nepal operating international services to Kuala Lumpur, Doha, Dubai, and Bangkok. Founded in 2005, it ceased operations on 8 March 2006 after disagreement with lessor PBair.

== History ==
The airline started services on 24 July 2005. All of its flights were suspended from 22 December 2005 without prior notice leaving 53 passengers stranded in Kathmandu. In 2007, the airline ultimately failed to resume its services.

== Destinations ==
Air Nepal International regularly served the following destinations, which were cancelled either at the closure of operations or before:

Country	City	IATA	ICAO	Airport	Notes	Refs
Malaysia	Kuala Lumpur	KUL	WMKK	Kuala Lumpur International Airport		
Nepal	Kathmandu	KTM	VNKT	Tribhuvan International Airport	Hub	
Qatar	Doha	DOH	OTBD	Doha International Airport		
Thailand	Bangkok	BKK	VTBS	Suvarnabhumi Airport		
United Arab Emirates	Dubai	DXB	OMDB	Dubai International Airport		

== Fleet ==
At the time of its closure, Air Nepal International operated the following aircraft:

Air Nepal International fleet
Aircraft	In Service	Passengers			Note
Aircraft	In Service	C	Y	Total	Note
Boeing 767-300	1	24	221	245	leased from PB Air
Total	1				
