= Air Andaman =

Regional airline of Thailand (2000–2004)

IATA	ICAO	Call sign
2Y	AOW	AIR ANDAMAN
- Founded: 29 October 2000
- Ceased operations: 2004
- Hubs: Bangkok–Don Mueang
- Focus cities: Chiang Mai

Air Andaman was a Thai regional airline based in Bangkok, Thailand. It was a regional carrier operating a small network of domestic and international services, as well as charter flights. The airline ceased all operations in 2004.

== History ==
The airline was established in 2000 and started operations on 29 October 2000. It was one of several new carriers formed to take advantage of the deregulation of the air transport industry in Thailand and the Thai government's "Open Skies" policy, which came into effect on 1 September 2000.

Air Andaman's services included a domestic route between Bangkok and Phuket and flights to Singapore. In 2003-04 it had an extensive network with 13 regional destinations served from Bangkok and Chiang Mai.

But by the end of 2004, the airline was defunct. In March 2006, Thailand's Civil Aviation Department said it was withdrawing the airline's license.

The airline's major shareholders were Atichart Athakravi and Prathip Boonprasom, who in March 2006 was planning a comeback with German investor Hubert Joseph Trunser and Swiss investor Bernan Luthee in a joint venture called Asian Aerospace Service. The new airline aimed to run chartered flights from Bangkok with two Jetstream aircraft.

== Destinations ==
During its four-year existence, Air Andaman flew to the following destinations:

- Thailand
  - Bangkok — Don Mueang International Airport (hub)
  - Chiang Mai — Chiang Mai International Airport (focus city)
  - Chumphon — Chumphon Airport
  - Mae Hong Son — Mae Hong Son Airport
  - Mae Sot — Mae Sot Airport
  - Nakhon Ratchasima — Nakhon Ratchasima Airport
  - Nan — Nan Nakhon Airport
  - Phrae — Phrae Airport
  - Phuket — Phuket International Airport
  - Surin — Surin Airport

== Fleet ==
Air Andaman had operated the following aircraft (at 2003-04):

- 3 Fokker 50 based in Bangkok
- 2 BAe Jetstream 31 based in Chiang Mai
