= Thai AirAsia =

Low-cost airline of Thailand

Thai AirAsia ไทยแอร์เอเชีย

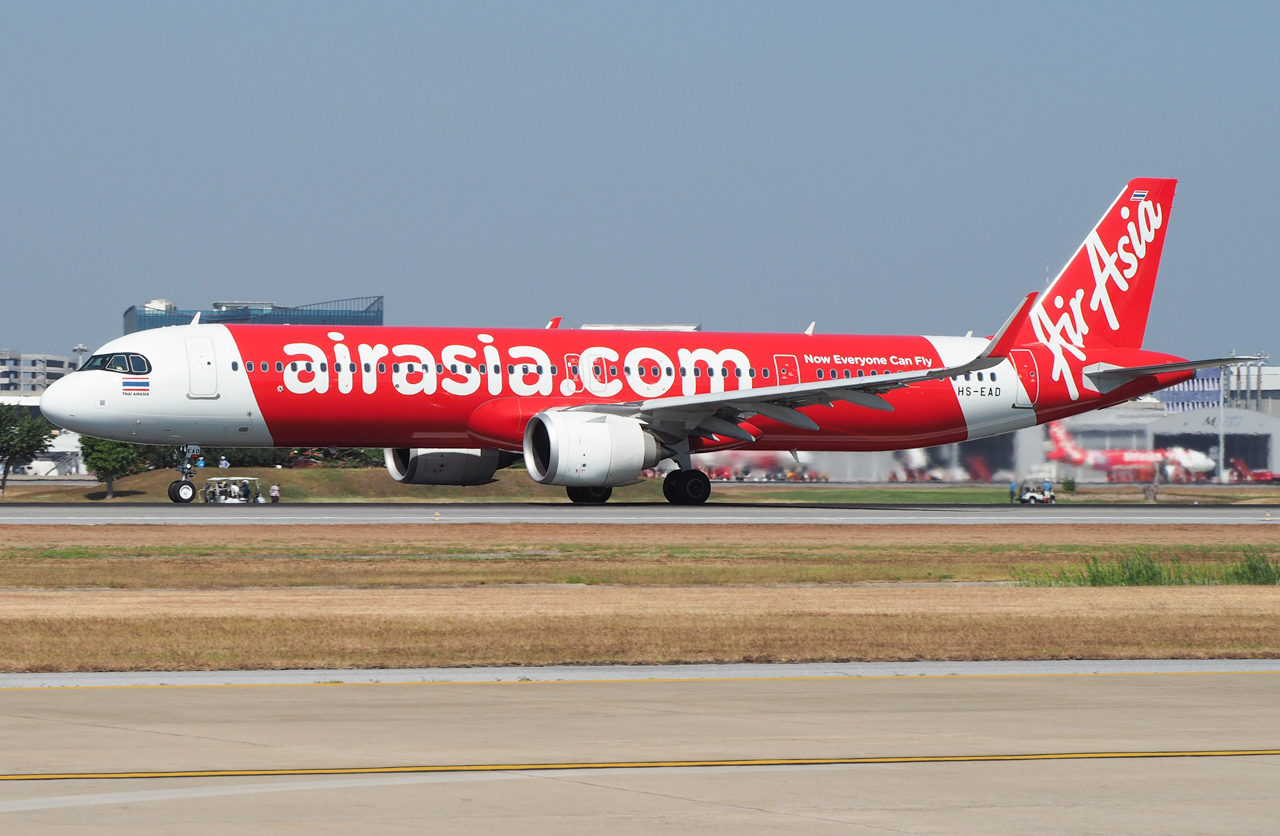
- A Thai AirAsia Airbus A321neo at Don Mueang International Airport
IATA	ICAO	Call sign
FD	AIQ	THAI ASIA
- Founded: 12 November 2003; 23 years ago
- Commenced operations: 4 February 2004; 22 years ago
- AOC #: AOC.0002
- Operating bases: Bangkok–Don Mueang; Bangkok–Suvarnabhumi; Chiang Mai; Chiang Rai; Hat Yai; Krabi; Phuket
- Frequent-flyer program: BIG Loyalty Programme
- Fleet size: 62
- Destinations: 67
- Parent company: Asia Aviation Public Company Limited
- Traded as: SET: AAV
- Headquarters: Don Mueang International Airport, Bangkok,Thailand
- Key people: Santisuk Klongchaiya (CEO)
- Revenue: ▼THB 2.15 billion (2021)
- Net income: ▼THB −6.65 billion (2021)
- Website: www.airasia.com

Thai AirAsia (SET: AAV, Thai: ไทยแอร์เอเชีย) is a Thai low-cost airline. It is a joint venture of Malaysian AirAsia (แอร์เอเชีย) and Thailand's Asia Aviation. It serves AirAsia's regularly scheduled domestic and international flights from Bangkok and other cities in Thailand.

== History ==
On 12 November 2003, AirAsia partnered with Shin Corporation to establish AirAsia Aviation Co. Ltd. (Thai AirAsia). It launched operations in February 2004 by launching flights from Bangkok–Don Mueang to Hat Yai, Phuket, and Chiang Mai.

On 15 February 2006, it was announced that Asia Aviation PLC (AAV), a registered Thai company, had taken Shin Corporation's 50 percent stake in Thai AirAsia. Asia Aviation was a joint venture set up by Shin Corporation, which held 49 percent of Asia Aviation's shares, while 51 percent was held by Thai investor Sittichai Veerathammanoon.

In May 2007, Thai AirAsia's management acquired 100 percent of Asia Aviation. Thai AirAsia is 55 percent owned by Asia Aviation and 45 percent owned by Malaysia-based AirAsia Group. In June 2016 King Power purchased a US$225 million stake in Thai AirAsia. The purchase of 39 percent of holding company Asia Aviation makes King Power the second largest shareholder in Thai AirAsia. It sold back its shares to Asia Aviation a year later.

Thai AirAsia was once the only low-cost airline operating both domestic and international flights from Suvarnabhumi Airport in Bangkok, having moved there in 2007 from Don Mueang International Airport. However, the airline transferred all operations from Suvarnabhumi to Don Mueang on 1 October 2012. On 25 September 2020, Thai AirAsia resumed flights from Suvarnabhumi Airport.

== Destinations ==
As of October 2026, Thai AirAsia flies (or has flown) to the following destinations:

Country	City	Airport	Notes	Refs
Bangladesh	Dhaka	Hazrat Shahjalal International Airport		
Cambodia	Phnom Penh	Techo International Airport		
Cambodia	Siem Reap	Siem Reap International Airport	Airport closed	
Cambodia	Siem Reap	Siem Reap–Angkor International Airport		
Cambodia	Sihanoukville	Sihanouk International Airport	Suspended	
China	Beijing	Beijing Daxing International Airport		
China	Changsha	Changsha Huanghua International Airport		
China	Chengdu	Chengdu Tianfu International Airport		
China	Chongqing	Chongqing Jiangbei International Airport		
China	Guangzhou	Guangzhou Baiyun International Airport		
China	Haikou	Haikou Meilan International Airport	Terminated	
China	Hangzhou	Hangzhou Xiaoshan International Airport		
China	Kunming	Kunming Changshui International Airport		
China	Meizhou	Meizhou Meixian Airport	Terminated	
China	Nanchang	Nanchang Changbei International Airport		
China	Nanjing	Nanjing Lukou International Airport		
China	Nanning	Nanning Wuxu International Airport	Terminated	
China	Ningbo	Ningbo Lishe International Airport	Seasonal	
China	Sanya	Sanya Phoenix International Airport		
China	Shantou	Jieyang Chaoshan International Airport		
China	Shenzhen	Shenzhen Bao'an International Airport		
China	Wenzhou	Wenzhou Longwan International Airport	Terminated	
China	Wuhan	Wuhan Tianhe International Airport		
China	Xiamen	Xiamen Gaoqi International Airport	Terminated	
China	Xi'an	Xi'an Xianyang International Airport		
Hong Kong	Hong Kong	Hong Kong International Airport		
India	Ahmedabad	Ahmedabad Airport		
India	Bengaluru	Kempegowda International Airport		
India	Bhubaneswar	Biju Patnaik Airport	Terminated	
India	Chennai	Chennai International Airport		
India	Delhi	Indira Gandhi International Airport	Terminated	
India	Gaya	Gaya Airport	Seasonal	
India	Guwahati	Lokpriya Gopinath Bordoloi International Airport		
India	Hyderabad	Rajiv Gandhi International Airport		
India	Jaipur	Jaipur International Airport		
India	Kochi	Cochin International Airport		
India	Kolkata	Netaji Subhas Chandra Bose International Airport		
India	Lucknow	Chaudhary Charan Singh International Airport		
India	Tiruchirappalli	Tiruchirappalli International Airport	Terminated	
India	Varanasi	Lal Bahadur Shastri Airport	Terminated	
India	Visakhapatnam	Visakhapatnam Airport	Terminated	
Indonesia	Denpasar	Ngurah Rai International Airport		
Indonesia	Jakarta	Soekarno–Hatta International Airport	Terminated	
Indonesia	Medan	Kualanamu International Airport		
Japan	Fukuoka	Fukuoka Airport		
Japan	Naha	Naha Airport		
Japan	Tokyo	Narita International Airport		
Laos	Luang Prabang	Luang Prabang International Airport		
Laos	Vientiane	Wattay International Airport		
Macau	Macau	Macau International Airport		
Malaysia	Johor Bahru	Senai International Airport		
Malaysia	Kota Kinabalu	Kota Kinabalu International Airport	Terminated	
Malaysia	Kuala Lumpur	Kuala Lumpur International Airport		
Malaysia	Penang	Penang International Airport		
Maldives	Malé	Velana International Airport		
Myanmar	Yangon	Yangon International Airport		
Nepal	Kathmandu	Tribhuvan International Airport		
Nepal	Bhairahawa	Gautam Buddha International Airport		
Philippines	Cebu	Mactan–Cebu International Airport	Terminated	
Philippines	Manila	Ninoy Aquino International Airport		
Singapore	Singapore	Changi Airport		
South Korea	Seoul	Incheon International Airport	Ends 25 October 2026	
Sri Lanka	Colombo	Bandaranaike International Airport		
Taiwan	Kaohsiung	Kaohsiung International Airport		
Taiwan	Taipei	Taoyuan International Airport		
Thailand	Bangkok	Don Mueang International Airport	Base	
Thailand	Bangkok	Suvarnabhumi Airport	Base	
Thailand	Buriram	Buriram Airport		
Thailand	Chiang Mai	Chiang Mai International Airport	Base	
Thailand	Chiang Rai	Chiang Rai International Airport	Base	
Thailand	Chumphon	Chumphon Airport		
Thailand	Hat Yai	Hat Yai International Airport	Base	
Thailand	Hua Hin	Hua Hin Airport		
Thailand	Khon Kaen	Khon Kaen Airport		
Thailand	Krabi	Krabi International Airport	Base	
Thailand	Lampang	Lampang Airport		
Thailand	Loei	Loei Airport		
Thailand	Mae Sot	Mae Sot Airport	Terminated	
Thailand	Nakhon Si Thammarat	Nakhon Si Thammarat Airport		
Thailand	Nakhon Phanom	Nakhon Phanom Airport		
Thailand	Nan	Nan Airport		
Thailand	Narathiwat	Narathiwat Airport		
Thailand	Pattaya	U-Tapao International Airport	Terminated	
Thailand	Phuket	Phuket International Airport	Base	
Thailand	Phitsanulok	Phitsanulok Airport		
Thailand	Ranong	Ranong Airport		
Thailand	Roi Et	Roi Et Airport		
Thailand	Sakon Nakhon	Sakon Nakhon Airport		
Thailand	Surat Thani	Surat Thani International Airport		
Thailand	Trang	Trang Airport		
Thailand	Ubon Ratchathani	Ubon Ratchathani Airport		
Thailand	Udon Thani	Udon Thani International Airport		
Vietnam	Can Tho	Can Tho International Airport		
Vietnam	Da Nang	Da Nang International Airport		
Vietnam	Hanoi	Noi Bai International Airport		
Vietnam	Ho Chi Minh City	Tan Son Nhat International Airport		
Vietnam	Nha Trang	Cam Ranh International Airport		
Vietnam	Phu Quoc	Phu Quoc International Airport		

== Fleet ==
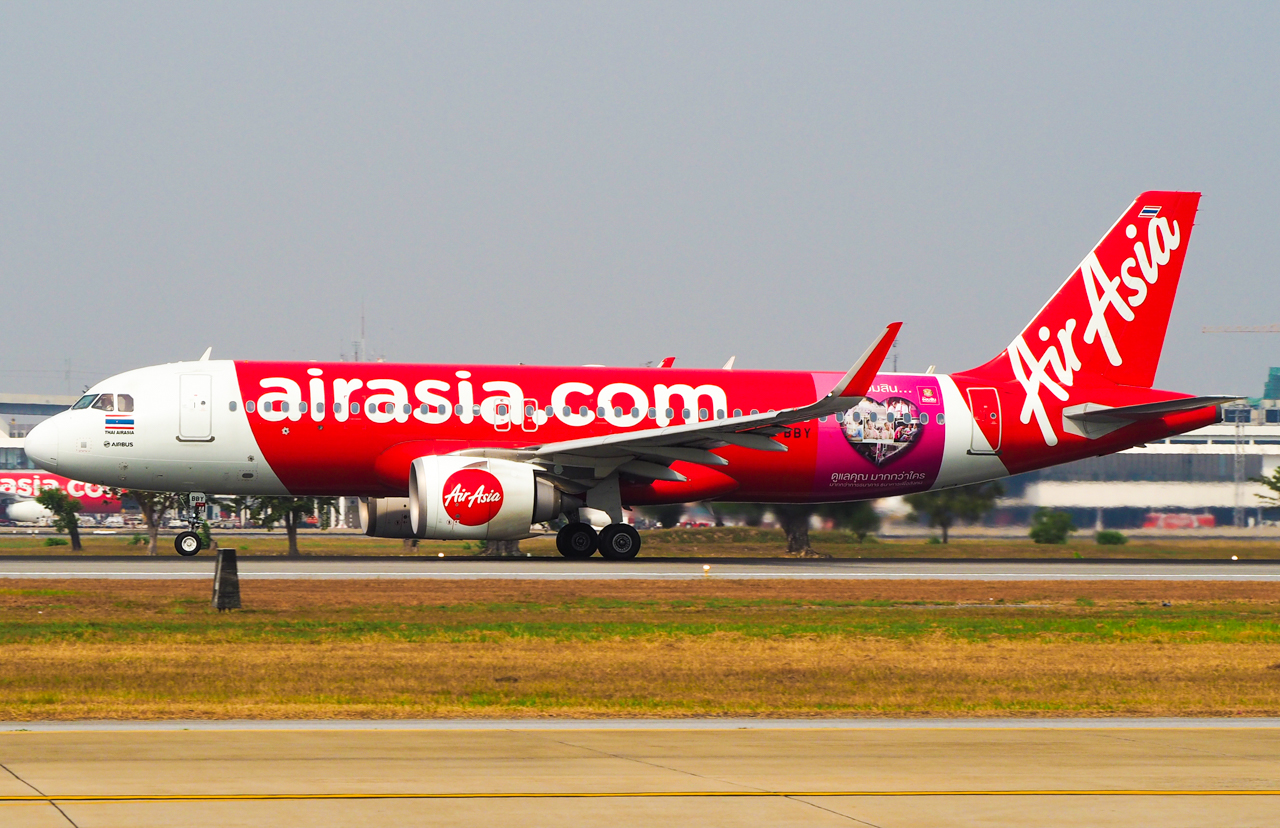
An Airbus A320neo of Thai AirAsia

=== Current fleet ===
As of August 2025, Thai AirAsia operates the following aircraft:

Thai AirAsia fleet
Aircraft	In service	Orders	Passengers	Notes
Airbus A320-200	44	4	180	
Airbus A320neo	11	—	186	
Airbus A321neo	7	3	236	
Total	62	7		

== Sponsorship ==
Thai AirAsia is one of the sponsors of the Thailand national football team, Leicester City, Queens Park Rangers, the Thai Fight Muay Thai, the Thai football teams BG Pathum United, Bangkok United, Buriram United, Muangthong United, Chonburi, Rajpracha, Police Tero, Chainat, Sisaket, Samut Prakan City, Rajnavy FC, Ubon United, Rayong, Port, Udon Thani, Krabi, Nakhon Ratchasima, Ayutthaya United, Khon Kaen, MOF CUTD, Nakhon Phanom, Loei City, Trang, Phayao, Phuket City, The referee of FAT, Coke Cup and Thailand Volleyball Association.

== Reliability and on-time performance ==
Thai Air Asia was recognized by Cirium as 2022's most reliable airline in Asia. Thai Air Asia had an on-time performance rate of 91.56% in 2022. This was the first year it had won the top position.
