= Patee Sarasin =

Thai business executive (born 1961)

Patee Sarasin (Thai: พาที สารสิน; born 24 October 1961) is a Thai business executive, best known as the CEO of low-cost carrier Nok Air from 2004 to 2017.

== Early life and career ==
A member of the Sarasin family, Patee attended The King's School, Canterbury in England and went to university in the United States, receiving a bachelor's degree in business administration and computer science from Clark University in Massachusetts. He began his career in the Thai advertising industry, working at Lintas Advertising before returning to the United States to earn a master's in mass communication, film and video from American University in Washington, D.C., after which he worked with the television network NBC for two years. He returned to Thailand in 1989 and joined SPA Advertising, then became general manager—and later CEO—of Bates Advertising Thailand in 1992.

== Nok Air ==
In 2004, Patee was invited to become CEO of Nok Air, the new low-cost carrier being launched as a joint venture of Thai Airways International. Patee oversaw the development of Nok Air's distinctive branding and eventually became its public face, using his own colourful, outspoken personality to represent and promote the airline. During his tenure, the airline went through several struggles, including the 2004 tsunami soon after its launch, the 2008 oil price spike, and the 2011 flood, which inundated the airline's base at Don Mueang Airport. The airline returned to profitability from 2009 to 2013, but faced further crises including a collapse of its check-in system in 2015 and a pilot strike in 2016, which combined with increased competition from the launch of Thai Lion Air in 2013, saw Nok Air incurring heavy losses for several consecutive years, and Patee resigned from his position as CEO in September 2017.

== Later ventures ==
After leaving Nok Air, Patee founded the online travel agency Really Really Cool in 2018. In 2020, he released an autobiography titled Smiling Through Turbulence, detailing his time at Nok Air, and in 2023, he announced the launch of a new airline, titled Really Cool Airlines, which is expected to begin operations in 2024.

== Personal life ==
Patee is married to former actress Pitipat Sarasin (née Piyawan Jittanatum), with two children.
