= Y2 =

Y2 may refer to:

- Boeing Y2, a next-generation aircraft project delivered as the Boeing 787
- Greek submarine Papanikolis (Υ-2), a 1927 submarine
- Flyglobespan, a British airline (IATA code Y2, 2003–2009)

== See also ==
- 2Y (disambiguation)
