= Chumphon =

Town in Chumphon Province, Thailand

Chumphon ชุมพร
- Town, District and Provincial Capital
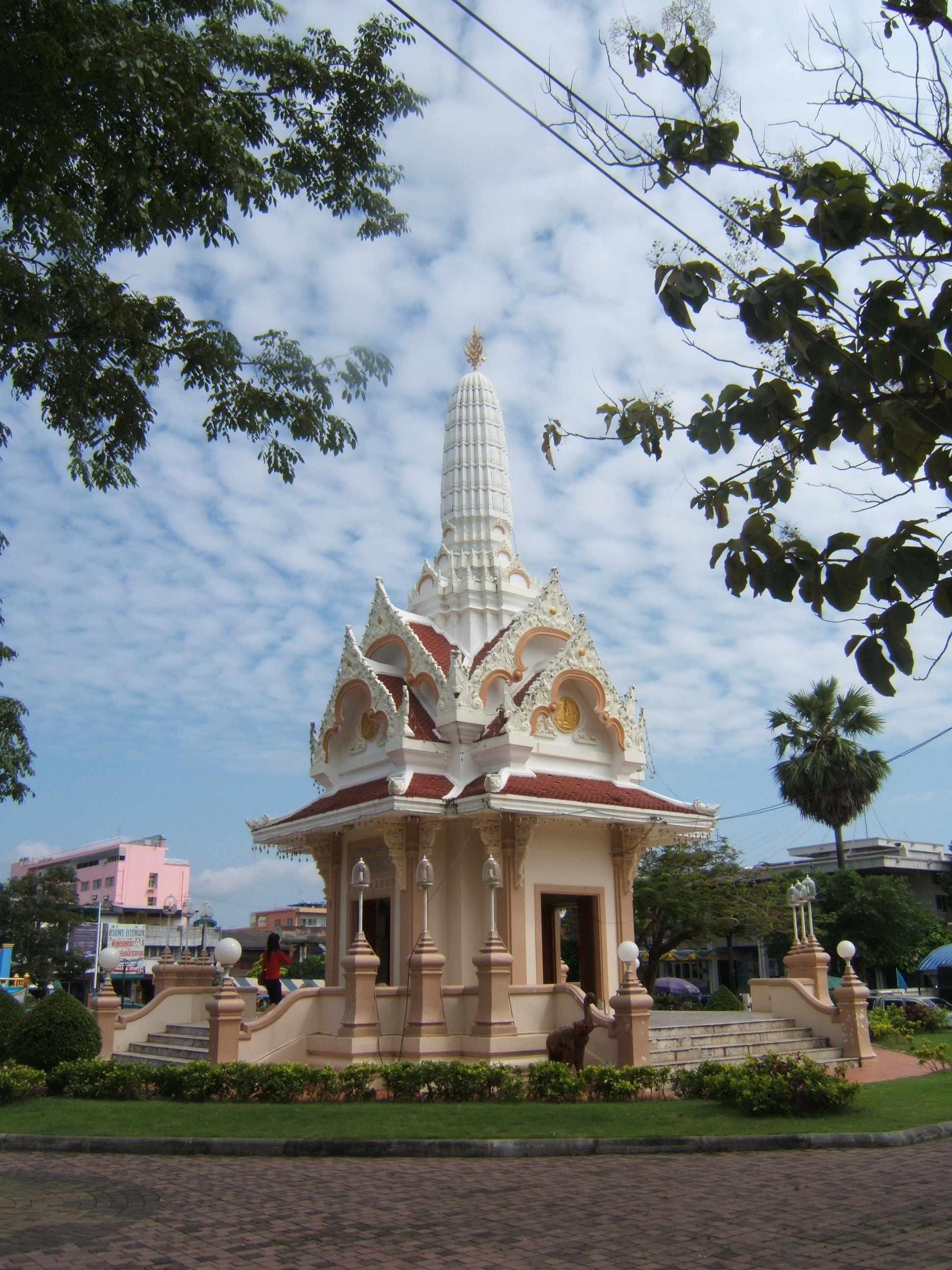
- Chumphon city pillar shrine
- Interactive map of Chumphon
- Coordinates: 10°29′38″N 99°10′48″E
- Country: Thailand
- Province: Chumphon Province
- District: Mueang Chumphon District

Area
  - Total: 8.15 sq mi (21.10 km^{2})
- Elevation: 39 ft (12 m)

Population (2018)
  - Total: 33,633
  - Density: 4,130/sq mi (1,595/km^{2})
- Time zone: UTC+7 (ICT)
- Website: chumphon.go.th/2013/home

Chumphon (Thai: ชุมพร, pronounced [t͡ɕʰūm.pʰɔ̄ːn]) is a town (thesaban mueang) in southern Thailand, capital of the Chumphon Province and Mueang Chumphon District. The city is about 463 kilometers (288 miles) from Bangkok. As of 2018 it had a population of around 33,600. The town covers the commune (tambon) Tha Taphao completely and parts of tambons Bang Mak, Wang Phai, Na Thung, Tak Daet, and Khun Krathing. Its main economic activity is agriculture.

== History ==
Chumphon volunteers fought invading Japanese during World War II. Chumphon became a rail hub for Imperial Japan. It was a station on the Southern Line and connected to the short-lived Kra Isthmus Railway.

== Geography ==
Chumphon lies just inland from the west coast of the Gulf of Thailand. To the west are the northern hills of the Phuket Range, a subrange of the Tenasserim Hills. These hills reach 400 metres (1,300 ft) in the area near Chumphon. There are also many smaller peaks in the area in the range of 100 metres (330 ft) to 200 metres (660 ft) high.

== Climate ==
Chumphon has a tropical monsoon climate (Köppen climate classification Am) just falling short of a tropical rainforest climate (Köppen Af). Temperatures are hot throughout the year. The period from December to April has relatively less rainfall than from May to November, when rainfall can be very heavy, particularly in October and November.

Climate data for Chumphon (1991–2020, extremes 1951-present)
Month	Jan	Feb	Mar	Apr	May	Jun	Jul	Aug	Sep	Oct	Nov	Dec	Year
Record high °C (°F)	34.8 (94.6)	36.4 (97.5)	38.0 (100.4)	39.0 (102.2)	39.8 (103.6)	36.2 (97.2)	35.4 (95.7)	35.6 (96.1)	35.6 (96.1)	35.7 (96.3)	34.5 (94.1)	34.0 (93.2)	39.8 (103.6)
Mean daily maximum °C (°F)	30.8 (87.4)	31.9 (89.4)	33.3 (91.9)	34.3 (93.7)	33.6 (92.5)	32.6 (90.7)	31.9 (89.4)	31.9 (89.4)	31.7 (89.1)	31.2 (88.2)	30.6 (87.1)	30.2 (86.4)	32.0 (89.6)
Daily mean °C (°F)	26.0 (78.8)	26.8 (80.2)	27.9 (82.2)	28.8 (83.8)	28.3 (82.9)	27.9 (82.2)	27.4 (81.3)	27.3 (81.1)	27.1 (80.8)	26.8 (80.2)	26.5 (79.7)	25.7 (78.3)	27.2 (81.0)
Mean daily minimum °C (°F)	21.9 (71.4)	22.5 (72.5)	23.6 (74.5)	24.7 (76.5)	25.0 (77.0)	24.8 (76.6)	24.4 (75.9)	24.5 (76.1)	24.3 (75.7)	23.9 (75.0)	23.3 (73.9)	22.0 (71.6)	23.7 (74.7)
Record low °C (°F)	12.1 (53.8)	14.4 (57.9)	17.0 (62.6)	21.8 (71.2)	22.0 (71.6)	22.2 (72.0)	21.5 (70.7)	22.1 (71.8)	21.6 (70.9)	18.8 (65.8)	15.1 (59.2)	12.2 (54.0)	12.1 (53.8)
Average precipitation mm (inches)	96.7 (3.81)	51.7 (2.04)	110.3 (4.34)	93.2 (3.67)	171.0 (6.73)	163.0 (6.42)	195.0 (7.68)	199.2 (7.84)	178.9 (7.04)	247.2 (9.73)	258.6 (10.18)	172.6 (6.80)	1,937.4 (76.28)
Average precipitation days (≥ 1.0 mm)	5.5	3.1	5.3	5.8	13.0	14.2	16.5	16.0	15.4	15.9	11.9	6.9	129.5
Average relative humidity (%)	80.8	79.3	78.3	77.9	80.7	81.0	82.1	81.8	83.3	85.1	83.8	80.4	81.2
Average dew point °C (°F)	22.2 (72.0)	22.6 (72.7)	23.4 (74.1)	24.2 (75.6)	24.4 (75.9)	24.1 (75.4)	23.8 (74.8)	23.7 (74.7)	23.8 (74.8)	23.9 (75.0)	23.2 (73.8)	21.8 (71.2)	23.4 (74.1)
Mean monthly sunshine hours	195.3	214.7	238.7	201.0	155.0	114.0	117.8	114.7	108.0	145.7	174.0	195.3	1,974.2
Mean daily sunshine hours	6.3	7.6	7.7	6.7	5.0	3.8	3.8	3.7	3.6	4.7	5.8	6.3	5.4
Source 1: World Meteorological Organization
Source 2: Office of Water Management and Hydrology, Royal Irrigation Department (sun 1981–2010)(extremes)

== Transport ==
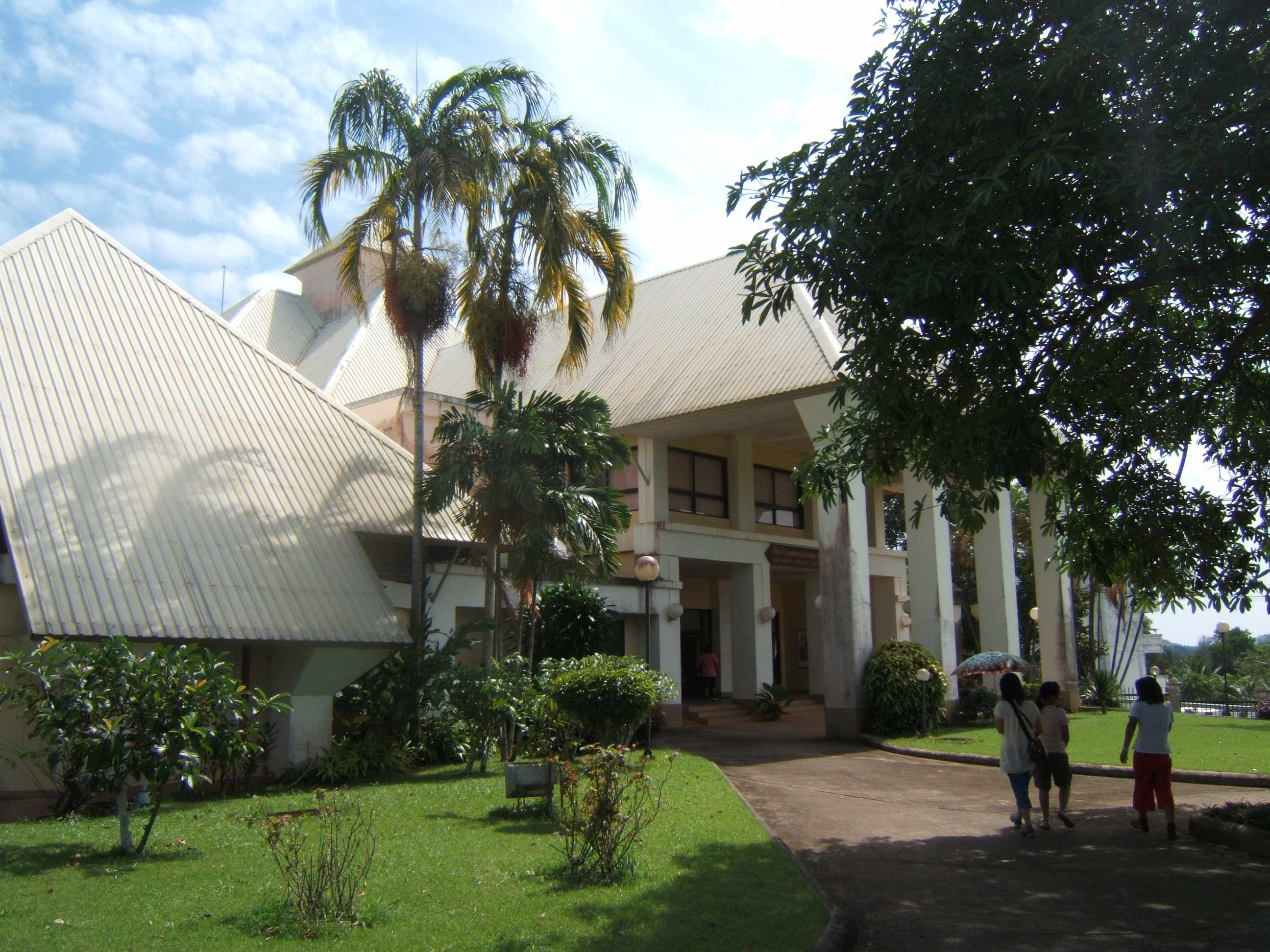
National Museum, Chumphon

- Bus: There is a small bus system within the city itself. Trains and buses run to and from Bangkok every day.
- Road: The main road through Chumphon is Thailand Highway 4, also known as Phetkasem Road, leading north to Bangkok, and south to Ranong, Phang Nga, Krabi, Trang, Phatthalung, and the border with Malaysia near Sadao.
- Rail: The Chumphon railway station is on the Southern Line of the State Railway of Thailand. Trains also stop at Pathio railway station in Chumphon Province.
- Air: The city's airport, Chumphon Airport (IATA: CJM, ICAO: VTSE) is 30 km north in Pathio District. The airport has daily flights to Bangkok.

Nok Air and Thai AirAsia operate multiple daily flights between Bangkok (Don Mueang, DMK) and Chumphon Airport. The airport is a hub and regional gateway providing connecting services to Chumphon city and high speed ferry services to the islands of the Gulf of Thailand including Ko Tao and Ko Samui.

== Popular culture ==
- In the science fiction novel, The Chronoliths, Chumphon is the landing site of the first chronolith.
