= Tak Airport =

Airport in northern Thailand

Coordinates: 16.89600°N 99.25330°E

Tak Airport ท่าอากาศยานตาก
- IATA: TKT; ICAO: VTPT

Summary
- Airport type: Public
- Operator: Department of Airports
- Serves: Tak
- Location: Nam Ruem, Mueang Tak, Tak, Thailand
- Opened: 31 May 1977; 49 years ago
- Elevation AMSL: 478 ft (146 m)
- Interactive map of Tak Airport

Runways
Direction	Length		Surface
Direction	ft	m	Surface
09/27	4,921	1,500	Hard

Tak Airport (IATA: TKT, ICAO: VTPT) is in Nam Ruem subdistrict, Mueang Tak district, Tak province in northern Thailand.

From November 1990 to March 1994, Thai Airways International served the routes of Tak Airport. There are no airlines in service since then, but the Tak Airport is still in operation.

In 2020, the Department of Royal Rainmaking and Agricultural Aviation has established the Northern Royal Rainmaking Operations Center in Tak Province, using the Tak Airport's area. The construction is expected to be completed in 2023, and planned to move all Northern Royal Rainmaking operations from the Chiang Mai Center and Chiang Mai Airport to the new Tak Center.

== Plans ==
Airports of Thailand PCL (AOT) is budgeting 220 billion baht in 2018 for the creation of two new airports and the expansion of four existing airports owned by the Department of Airports (DOA). Tak Airport is one of the four slated for expansion and AOT management. AOT intends to build Chiang Mai 2 in Lamphun Province and Phuket Airport 2 in Phang Nga Province. In the 2018 plan, the three other existing airports to be managed by AOT are Chumphon Airport, Sakon Nakhon Airport, and Udon Thani International Airport. In 2019, the plan changed to hire AOT to manage Tak, Udon Thani and Buriram airports, but DOA still remain the ownership of them, and leaving Sakon Nakhon and Chumphon airports to the DOA. With the AOT management, Tak Airport will be a cargo airport, mainly focusing on air freight, due to lack of passengers in the area.

The plan of the Tak Airport is not active at all. Finally, in March 2022, the plan changed to Udon Thani, Buriram and Krabi airports, and the Tak Airport is not in the list anymore, then the Tak Airport plan is cancelled implicitly.
