= Chumphon Airport =

Airport in southern Thailand

Chumphon Airport ท่าอากาศยานชุมพร
- IATA: CJM; ICAO: VTSE

Summary
- Airport type: Public
- Owner/Operator: Department of Airports
- Serves: Chumphon
- Location: Tambon Chum Kho, Amphoe Pathio, Chumphon, Thailand
- Opened: 14 March 1998; 28 years ago
- Elevation AMSL: 5 m / 18 ft
- Coordinates: 10°42′40.32″N 099°21′42.14″E
- Website: www.chumphonairport.net

Maps
- Location of airport in Thailand
- Interactive map of Chumphon Airport

Runways
Direction	Length		Surface
Direction	m	ft	Surface
06/24	2,100	6,890	Asphalt

Statistics (2025)
- Passengers: 190,929 ▲0.95%
- Aircraft movements: 1,381 ▲1,255.31%
- Cargo (tonnes): -
- Sources: Department of Airports

Chumphon Airport (IATA: CJM, ICAO: VTSE) is in Tambon Chum Kho, Amphoe Pathio, Chumphon province in Southern Thailand. The airport is 35 kilometres (22 mi) north of downtown Chumphon.

== Airlines and destinations ==
Airlines	Destinations
Nok Air	Bangkok–Don Mueang
Thai AirAsia	Bangkok–Don Mueang

== Overview ==
In 2008 the airport reopened after nine years of closure. The airport now serves as a gateway to the islands of the Gulf of Thailand.

== Plans ==
Airports of Thailand (AOT) is budgeting 220 billion baht in 2018 for the creation of two new airports and the expansion of four existing airports owned by the Department of Airports. Chumphon Airport is one of the four slated for expansion and AOT management. AOT intends to build Chiang Mai 2 in Lamphun Province and Phuket Airport 2 in Phang Nga Province. The three other existing airports to be managed by AOT are Tak Airport, Sakon Nakhon Airport, and Udon Thani International Airport.
