= Si Kan =

Si Kan สีกัน
- Khwaeng
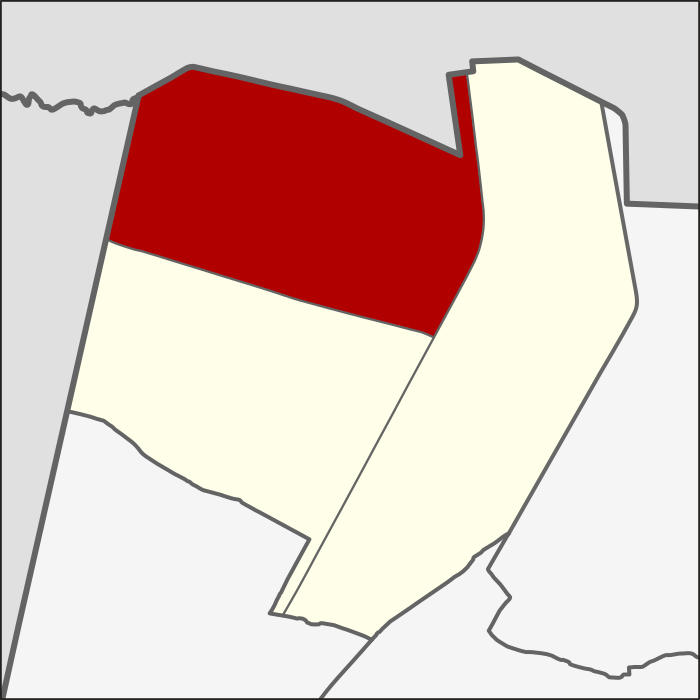
- Location in Don Mueang District
- Country: Thailand
- Province: Bangkok
- Khet: Don Mueang

Area
  - Total: 11.534 km^{2} (4.453 sq mi)

Population (2020)
  - Total: 64,527
- Time zone: UTC+7 (ICT)
- Postal code: 10210
- TIS 1099: 103602

Si Kan (Thai: สีกัน, pronounced [sǐː kān]) is a khwaeng (subdistrict) of Don Mueang District, in Bangkok, Thailand. In 2020, it had a total population of 64,527 people.
