= Sakon Nakhon Airport =

Airport in northeastern Thailand

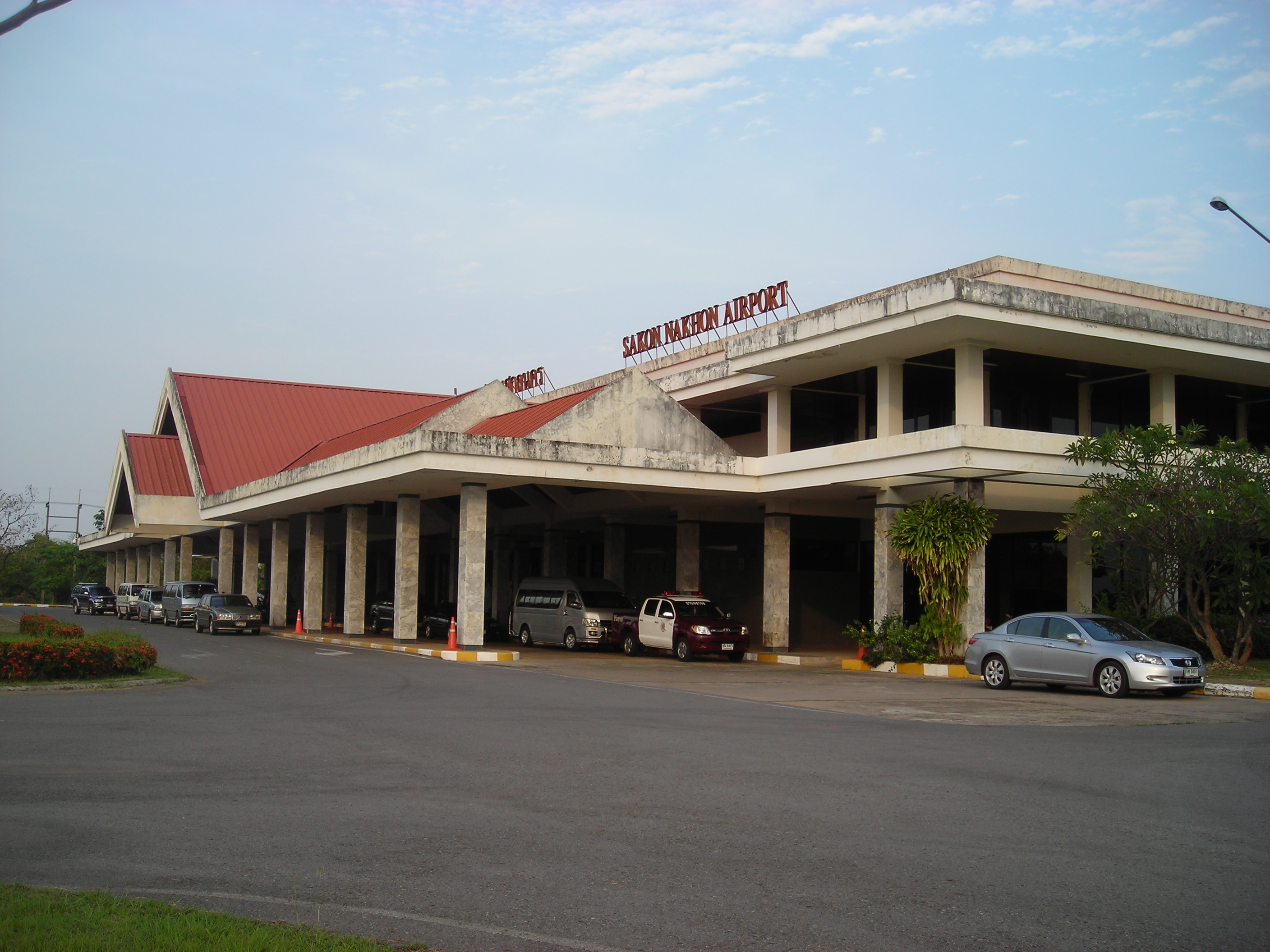
- IATA: SNO; ICAO: VTUI

Summary
- Airport type: Public / military
- Owner: Royal Thai Army
- Operator: Department of Airports
- Serves: Sakon Nakhon
- Location: That Na Weng, Mueang, Sakhon Nakhon, Thailand
- Opened: 1972; 54 years ago
- Elevation AMSL: 529 ft / 161 m
- Coordinates: 17°11′42.5″N 104°07′07.1″E
- Website: www.sakonnakhonairport.com

Maps
- Location of airport in Thailand
- Interactive map of Sakon Nakhon Airport

Runways
Direction	Length		Surface
Direction	ft	m	Surface
05/23	8,530	2,600	Asphalt

Statistics (2025)
- Passengers: 348,600 ▲
- Aircraft movements: 2,402 ▲
- Freight (tonnes): 0.00 ▲
- Sources: Department of Airports

Sakon Nakhon Airport (IATA: SNO, ICAO: VTUI) is in That Na Weng subdistrict, Mueang Sakon Nakhon district, Sakon Nakhon province in northeastern Thailand. It is used for civil and military purposes (Royal Thai Air Force).

== Airlines and destinations ==
Airlines	Destinations
Nok Air	Bangkok–Don Mueang
Thai AirAsia	Bangkok–Don Mueang

== Accidents ==
- On 23 September 1976, a Douglas C-47A (L2-40/15) of the Royal Thai Air Force was damaged beyond economic repair in a take-off accident.

== Plans ==
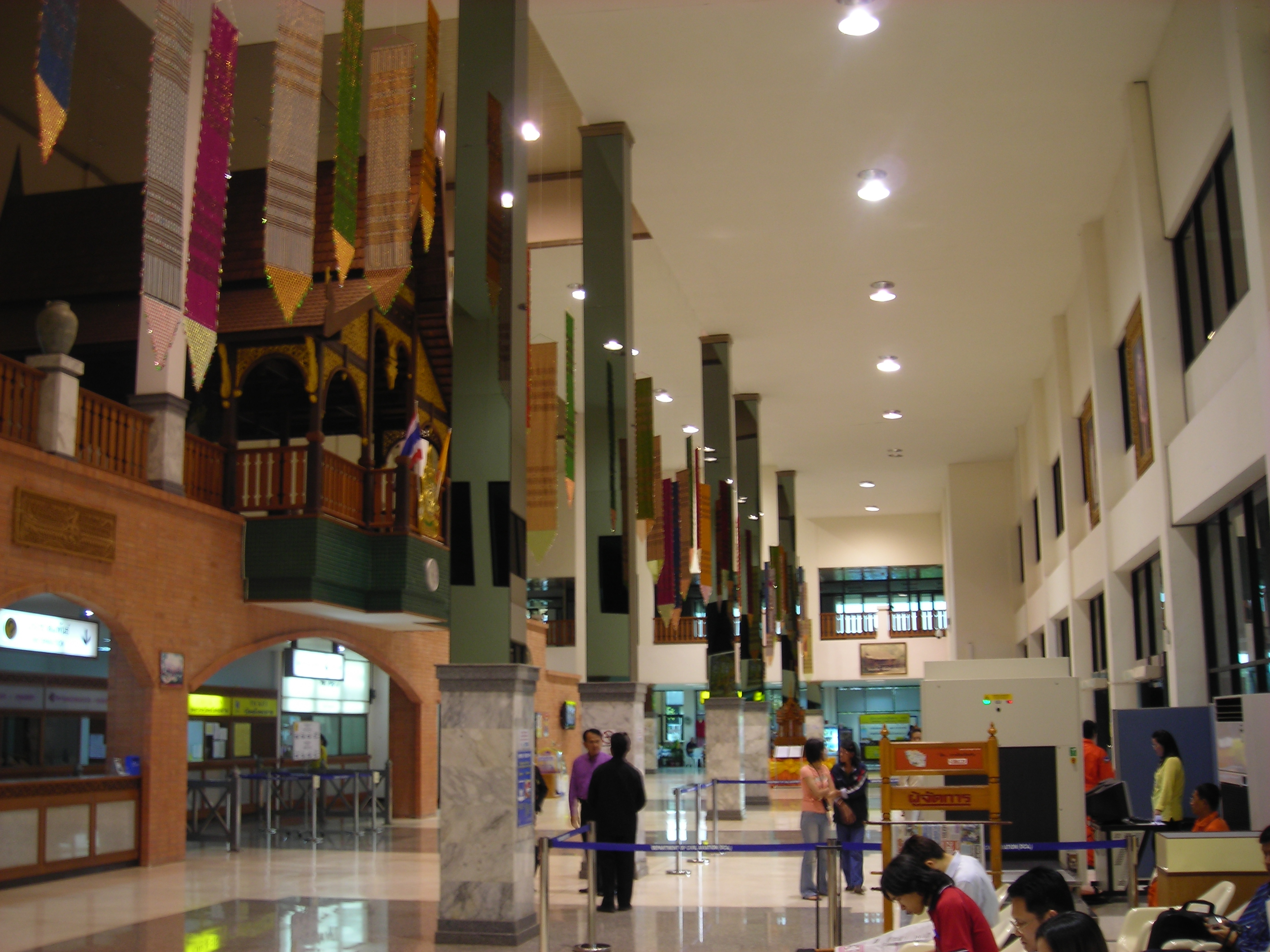
Inside Sakon Nakhon Airport

Airports of Thailand (AOT) budgeted 220 billion baht in 2018 for the creation of two new airports and the expansion of four existing airports owned by the Department of Airports. Sakon Nakhon Airport is one of the four slated for expansion and AOT management. AOT intends to build Chiang Mai 2 in Lamphun Province and Phuket Airport 2 in Phang Nga Province. The three other existing airports to be managed by AOT are Chumphon Airport, Tak Airport, and Udon Thani International Airport.
