= Udon Thani International Airport =

Airport in northeastern Thailand

Udon Thani International Airport ท่าอากาศยานอุดรธานี
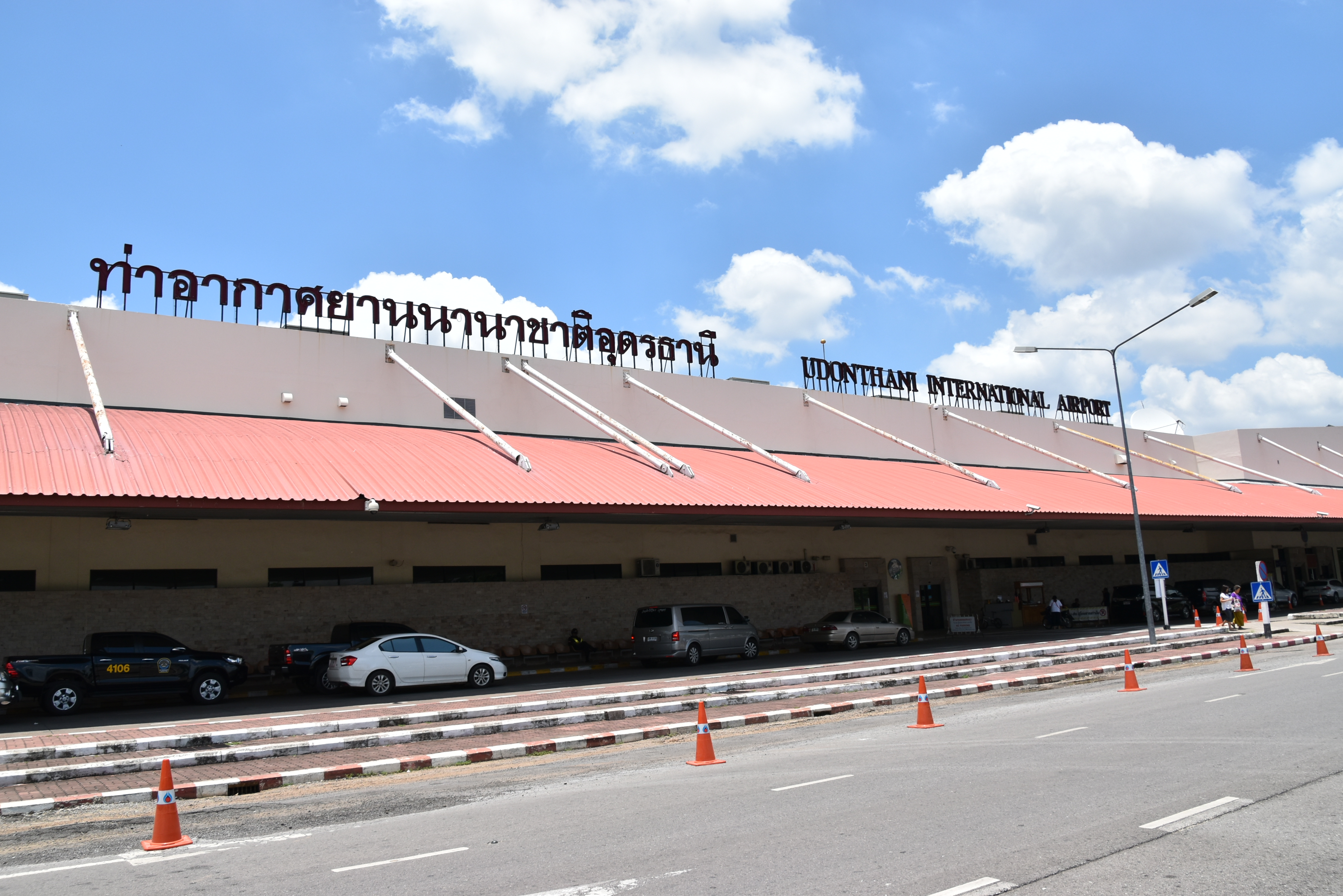
- IATA: UTH; ICAO: VTUD

Summary
- Airport type: Public / military
- Owner: Royal Thai Air Force
- Operator: Department of Airports
- Serves: Udon Thani
- Location: Nong Khon Kwang, Mueang, Udon Thani, Thailand
- Opened: 1932; 94 years ago
- Elevation AMSL: 579 ft (176 m)
- Coordinates: 17°23′11″N 102°47′18″E
- Website: https://minisite.airports.go.th/udonthani/home

Maps
- Location of airport in Thailand
- Interactive map of Udon Thani International Airport

Runways
Direction	Length		Surface
Direction	m	ft	Surface
12/30	3,048	10,000	Asphalt

Statistics (2025)
- Total passengers: 2,012,155 ▲6.96%%
- Aircraft movements: 13,737 ▲9.11%
- Freight (tonnes): 475.450 ▲3.34%
- Sources: Department of Airports

Udon Thani International Airport (IATA: UTH, ICAO: VTUD) is in the Nong Khon Kwang subdistrict, Mueang Udon Thani district, Udon Thani province in northeastern Thailand. It is approximately 450 kilometres (280 mi) northeast of Bangkok. In 2006, the airport had 677,411 passenger movements and 1,558 MT cargo movements. In 2013, the airport handled 1,325,305 passengers. In 2015, it handled 2,213,689 passengers and 3,678 tonnes of freight. It has been managed by the Department of Airports (DOA).

Udon Thani Airport is the DOA's moneymaker, with profits reaching 100 million baht a year. This airport was scheduled to be transferred to Airports of Thailand PCL (AOT) in the first half of 2023.

== History ==
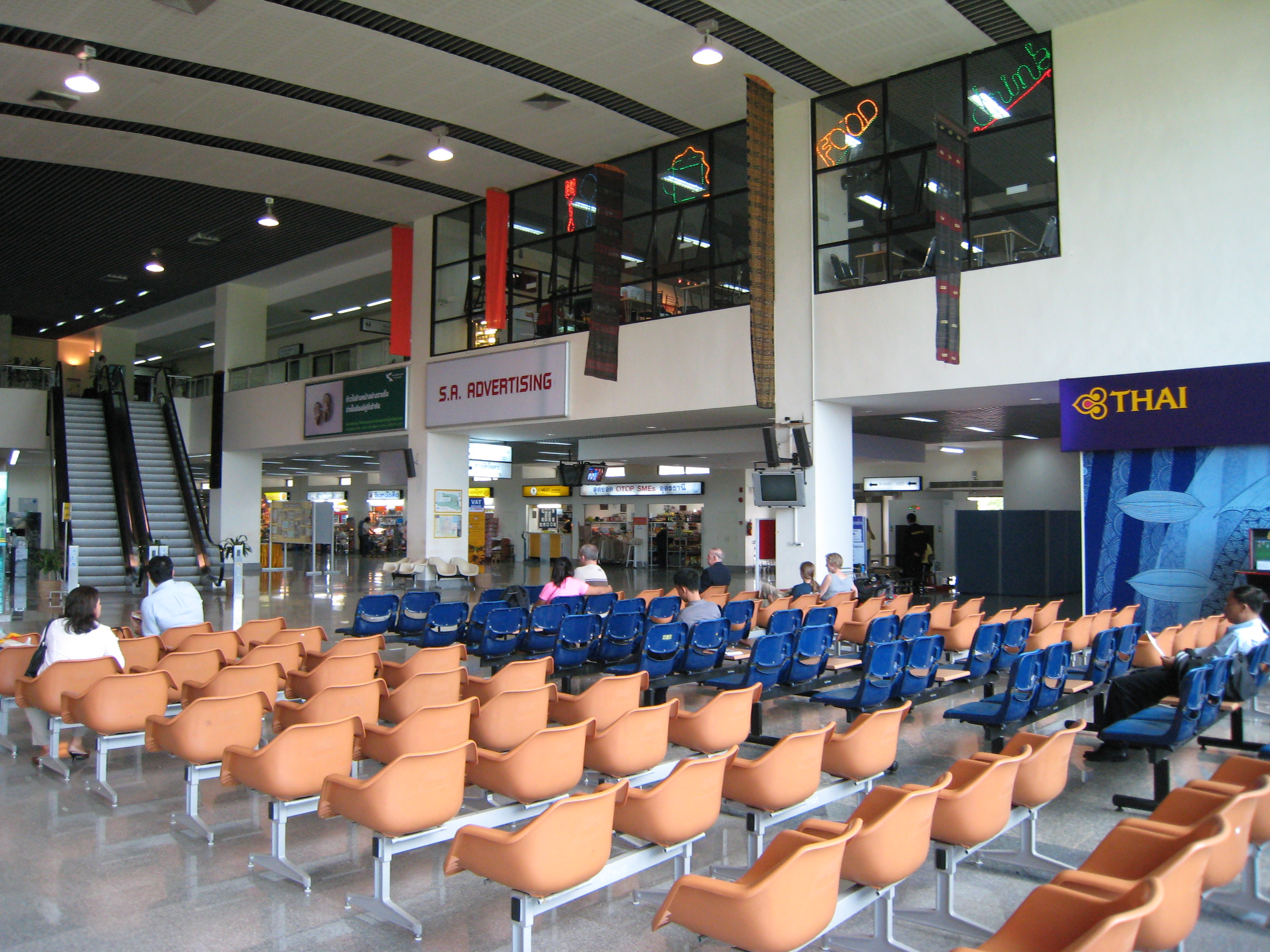
Udon Thani Airport terminal

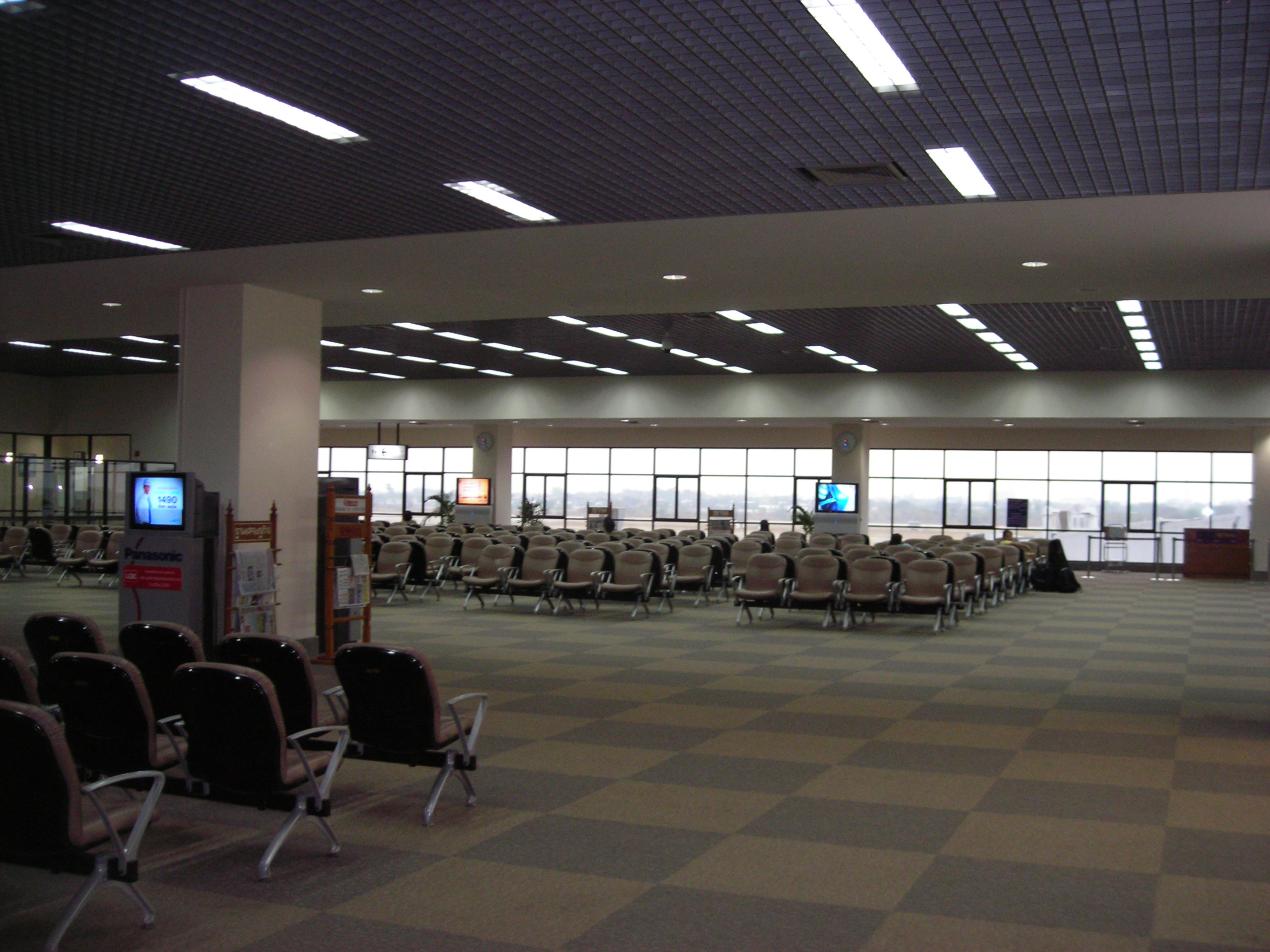
Departure lounge, Terminal 1, Udon Thani International Airport

During the Vietnam War the facility was known as Udorn Royal Thai Air Force Base, serving as a front-line base of the United States Air Force and was the Asian headquarters for Air America.

On 8 February 2006, an international group of skydivers from 31 countries called the "World Team" set a world record for the largest freefall formation, a 400-way, over the Udon Thani airport.

== Airlines and destinations ==
Airlines	Destinations
Nok Air	Bangkok–Don Mueang, Chiang Mai
Thai AirAsia	Bangkok–Don Mueang, Bangkok–Suvarnabhumi, Chiang Mai Phuket
Thai Airways International	Bangkok–Suvarnabhumi
Thai Lion Air	Bangkok–Don Mueang, Hat Yai, Pattaya
Thai VietJet Air	Bangkok–Suvarnabhumi

== Military use ==
As well as being a commercial facility, Udon Thani International Airport is also an active Royal Thai Air Force (RTAF) base, the home of Wing 23, 2nd Air Division Air Combat Command. The 231 Squadron flies 17 (out of 18 delivered) Dassault/Dornier Alpha Jet airplanes acquired second-hand from the German Air Force and delivered in 2001. The squadron previously flew F-5A/RF-5A/F-5B Freedom Fighter airplanes.

== Plans ==
Airports of Thailand (AOT) budgeted 220 billion baht in 2018 for the creation of two new airports and the expansion of four existing airports owned by the Department of Airports. Udon Thani is one of the four slated for expansion and AOT management. AOT intends to build Chiang Mai 2 in Lamphun Province and Phuket Airport 2 in Phang Nga Province. The three other existing airports to be managed by AOT are Chumphon Airport, Sakon Nakhon Airport, and Tak Airport.
