= Phrae Airport =

Airport in northern Thailand

Phrae Airport ท่าอากาศยานแพร่
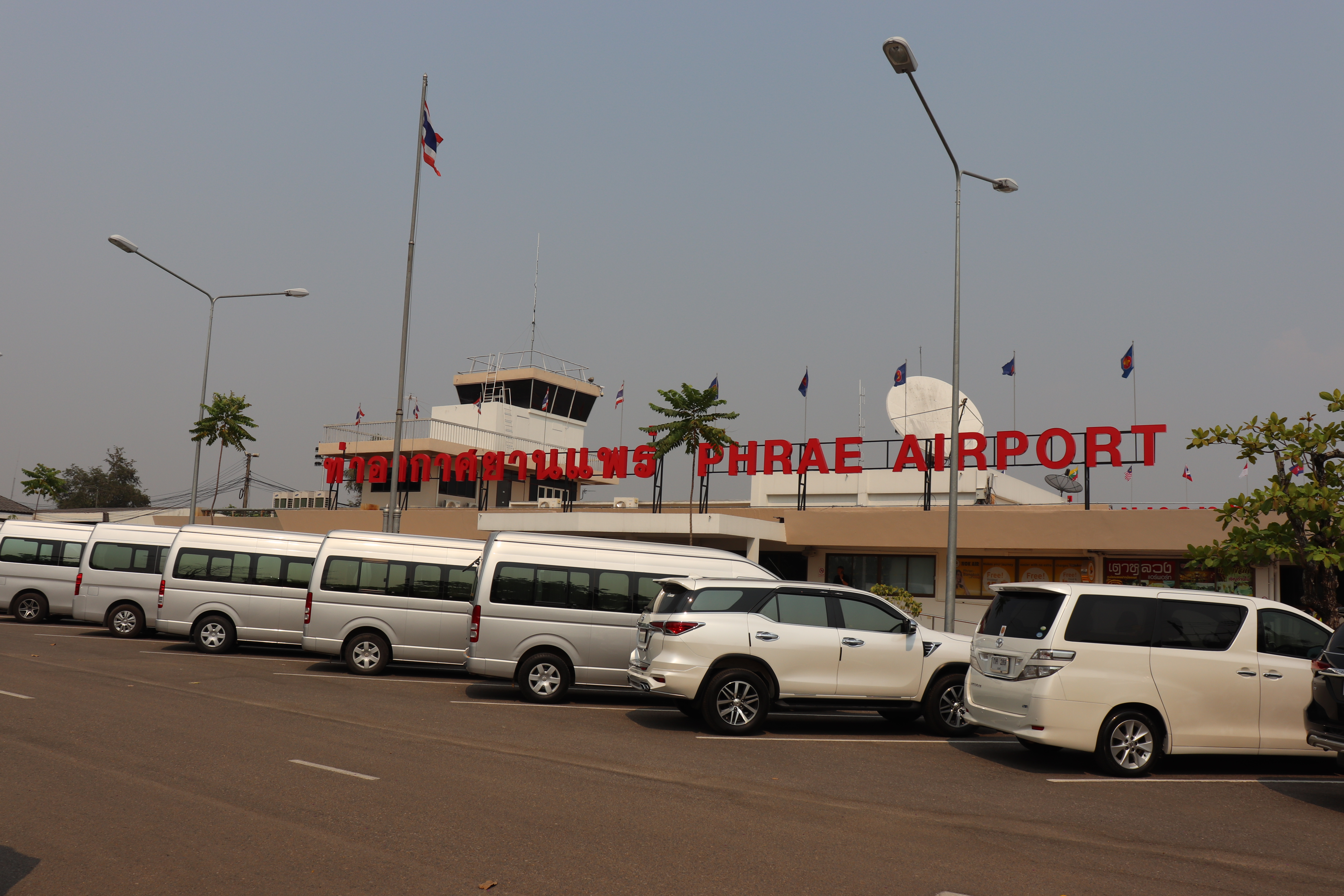
- IATA: PRH; ICAO: VTCP

Summary
- Airport type: Public
- Operator: Department of Airports
- Serves: Phrae
- Location: Tambon Na Chak, Amphoe Mueang Phrae, Phrae, Thailand
- Opened: 1952; 74 years ago
- Elevation AMSL: 538 ft / 164 m
- Coordinates: 18°07′54″N 100°09′52″E

Maps
- Interactive map of Phrae Airport

Runways
Direction	Length		Surface
Direction	ft	m	Surface
01/19	4,921	1,500	Asphalt

Statistics (2019)
- Passenger: 59,792
- Flights: 1,026
- Sources: DAFIF DCA

Phrae Airport (IATA: PRH, ICAO: VTCP) is in Tambon Na Chak, Amphoe Mueang Phrae, Phrae province in Northern Thailand.

== History ==
Phrae Airport was built during World War II with a gravel runway. After the war ended, the airport operator was given to Royal Thai Air Force for them to maintain. Then, Phrae Airport was developed by Department of Commercial Aviation (Thailand) in 1952 for passenger and airmail uses by upgrading the runway to be 30 x 1,200 meters and building a terminal.

In 1971–1973 the Department of Civil Aviation (Thailand) upgraded the runway, taxiway, and tarmac's material to be asphalt concrete, and extended the runway again to be 1,500 meters long. In 1974–1975, the current terminal was built, and was expanded in 1981–1982 to 250 square meters. The terminal was expanded again in 1990 to 432 square meters, and air conditioners were installed. A new seven-floor air traffic control tower was built to separate it from the terminal in 1996.

== Facilities ==
=== Terminal ===
Phrae Airport's terminal is three storeys tall, but only one floor is used. The building space is 1,400 square meters, and can accommodate up to 374 people per hour.

- Floor 1: departures and arrivals area, and airport's office
- Floor 2 and 3: previously used for air traffic control

The tarmac size is 60 by 180 meters, which can accommodate up to three ATR 72s at the same time. There are also six helicopter landing pads.

== Statistics ==
=== Traffic numbers ===
Traffic by calendar year
Year	Passengers	Change	Aircraft movements	Cargo (tonnes)
2001	19,749		1,458	42.42
2002	12,558	▼36.41%	860	15.81
2003	10,592	▼15.66%	722	17.01
2004	828	▼92.18%	41	0.396
2005	13	▼98.43%	17	0.00
2006	13	Steady	4	0.00
2007	440	▲3284.62%	180	0.00
2008	0	▼100.00%	0	0.00
2009	0	Steady	0	0.00
2010	470	▲	54	0.00
2011	3,494	▲643.40%	215	0.00
2012	9,056	▲159.19%	421	0.00
2013	13,690	▲51.17%	483	0.00
2014	23,371	▲70.72%	509	0.00
2015	48,673	▲108.26%	797	0.00
2016	72,274	▲48.49%	1,191	0.00
2017	80,961	▲12.02%	1,326	0.00
2018	88,971	▲9.89%	1,460	0.00
2019	70,069	▼21.25%	1,220	0.00
2020	34,947	▼50.12%	758	0.00
