= Nakhon Phanom Airport =

Airport in northeastern Thailand

Nakhon Phanom Airport ท่าอากาศยานนครพนม
- IATA: KOP; ICAO: VTUW

Summary
- Airport type: Public
- Owner: Royal Thai Navy
- Operator: Department of Airports
- Serves: Nakhon Phanom
- Location: Nong Yat, Mueang, Nakhon Phanom, Thailand
- Opened: 1 June 1963; 63 years ago
- Elevation AMSL: 587 ft / 179 m
- Coordinates: 17°23′02″N 104°38′35″E
- Website: minisite.airports.go.th/nakhonphanom

Maps
- Location of airport in Thailand
- Interactive map of Nakhon Phanom Airport

Runways
Direction	Length		Surface
Direction	ft	m	Surface
15/33	8,203	2,500	Asphalt

Statistics (2025)
- Passengers: 467,583 ▲4.05%
- Aircraft movements: 3,237 ▲2.49%
- Freight (tonnes): -
- Sources: Department of Airports

Nakhon Phanom Airport (IATA: KOP, ICAO: VTUW) is in Nong Yat subdistrict, Mueang Nakhon Phanom district, Nakhon Phanom province in northeastern Thailand. It was first constructed in 1962 by Seabees of U.S.N. Mobile Construction Battalion 3. The project was funded by the Military Assistance Program (MAP).

== Airlines and destinations ==
Airlines	Destinations
Thai AirAsia	Bangkok–Don Mueang
Thai Lion Air	Bangkok–Don Mueang
