= Phetchabun Airport =

Airport in northern Thailand

Phetchabun Airport ท่าอากาศยานเพชรบูรณ์
- IATA: PHY; ICAO: VTPB

Summary
- Airport type: Public / Military
- Operator: Department of Airports
- Serves: Phetchabun
- Location: Amphoe Lom Sak, Phetchabun, Thailand
- Opened: 8 April 2000; 26 years ago
- Elevation AMSL: 137 m / 450 ft
- Coordinates: 16°40′33″N 101°11′42″E

Map
- Location of the airport in Thailand

Runways
Direction	Length		Surface
Direction	m	ft	Surface
18/36	2,100	6,890	Asphalt
- Source: DAFIF

Phetchabun Airport (IATA: PHY, ICAO: VTPB) is in Amphoe Lom Sak, Phetchabun province in Northern Thailand.
