= Buriram Airport =

Airport in northeastern Thailand

Buriram Airport ท่าอากาศยานบุรีรัมย์
- IATA: BFV; ICAO: VTUO

Summary
- Airport type: Public
- Operator: Department of Airports
- Serves: Buriram; Surin
- Location: Tambon Ron Thong, Satuek, Buriram, Thailand
- Opened: 14 October 1996; 29 years ago
- Elevation AMSL: 590 ft (180 m)
- Coordinates: 15°13′46″N 103°15′04″E
- Website: minisite.airports.go.th/buriram

Maps
- Location of airport in Thailand
- Interactive map of Buriram Airport

Runways
Direction	Length		Surface
Direction	m	ft	Surface
04/22	2,100	6,890	Asphalt

Statistics (2025)
- Passengers: 241,946 ▼15%
- Aircraft movements: 1,756 ▼7.89%
- Freight (tonnes): -

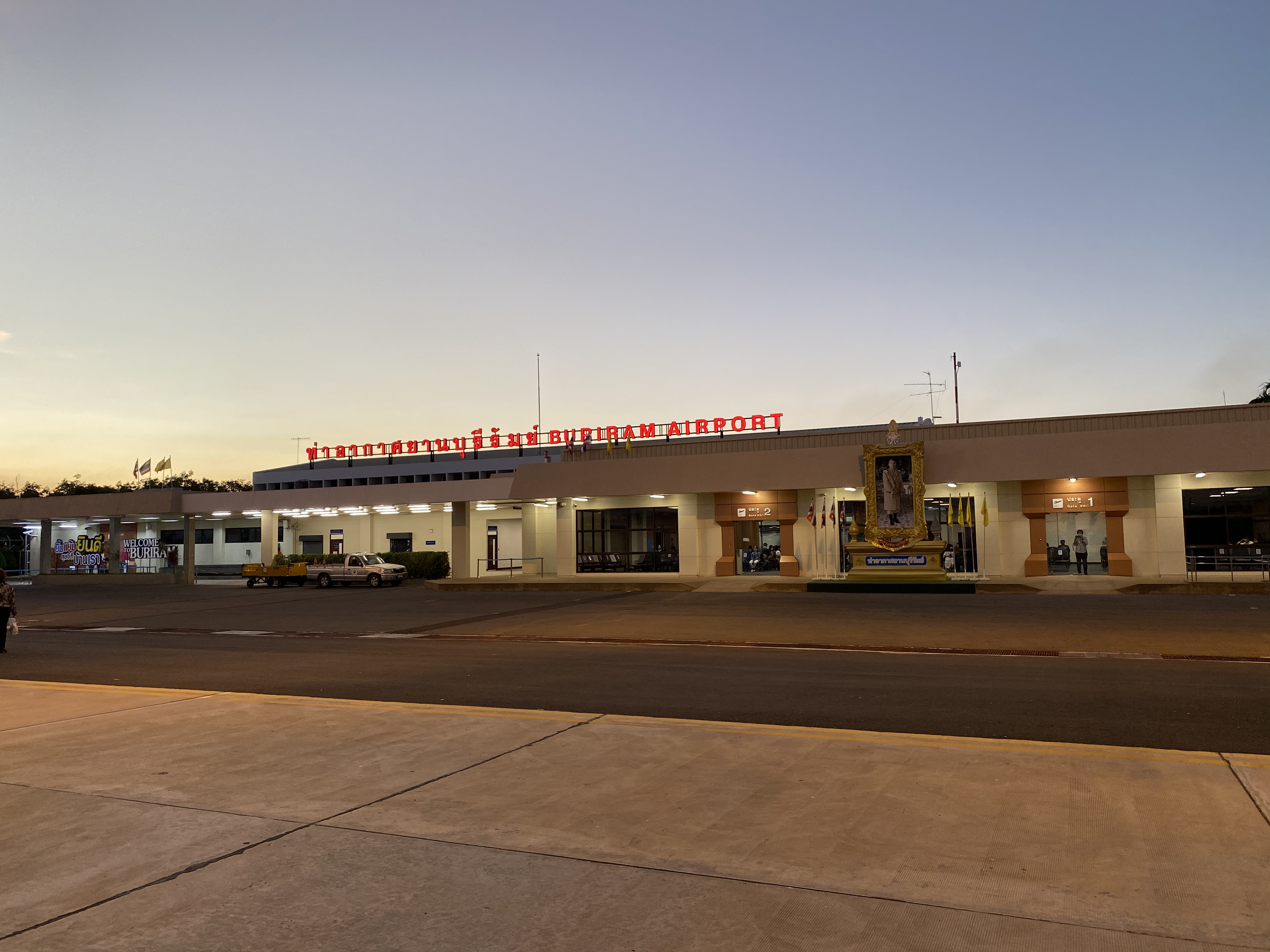
Old terminal building

Buriram Airport (IATA: BFV, ICAO: VTUO) — also spelled Buri Ram Airport — is in Tambon Ron Thong, Satuek district, Buriram Province in Northeastern Thailand.

== Facilities ==
The airport is at an elevation of 180 metres (591 ft) above mean sea level. It has one runway designated 04/22 with an asphalt surface measuring 2,100 by 45 metres (6,890 ft × 148 ft).

== Future Expansion ==
In 2019, the Department of Airports announced a 700 million baht second passenger terminal will be built at Buriram airport. It will increase the airport's capacity from 750,000 per year to 1.7 million. There will be an extension on the length of the runway to accommodate larger aircraft in the future.

== Airlines and destinations ==
Airlines	Destinations
Thai AirAsia	Bangkok–Don Mueang, Bangkok–Suvarnabhumi

=== Previously served airlines ===
Airlines	Destinations	Years served	Notes
Thai Airways International	Bangkok–Don Mueang	1996-2002	
Phuket Air	Bangkok–Don Mueang	2002-2005	
Nok Air	Bangkok–Don Mueang	? -2024	
PBair	Bangkok–Don Mueang	2005-2006	
PBair	Bangkok–Suvarnabhumi	2006-2009	

== Statistics ==
=== Traffic by calendar year ===
Traffic by calendar year
Year	Passengers	Change from previous year	Movements	Cargo (tons)
2001	33,964		765	22.1
2002	24,972	▼26.48%	788	6.62
2003	22,390	▼10.34%	712	5.10
2004	30,600	▲36.67%	753	2.21
2005	22,321	▼27.06%	541	1.41
2006	8,643	▼61.28%	348	0.24
2007	11,057	▲27.93%	424	0.14
2008	8,407	▼23.97%	318	0.02
2009	7,479	▼11.04%	298	0.00
2010	7,410	▼0.92%	240	0.00
2011	8,207	▲10.76%	427	0.00
2012	4,575	▼44.25%	318	0.00
2013	11,393	▲149.03%	501	0.00
2014	17,431	▲53.00%	408	0.00
2015	117,710	▲575.29%	1,508	0.00
2016	197,988	▲68.20%	2,258	0.00
2017	220,856	▲11.55%	2,609	0.00
2018	340,692	▲54.26%	3,197	0.00
2019	355,497	▲4.35%	3,461	0.00
2020	180,996	▼49.09%	2,404	0.00
2021	53,810	▼49.09%	842	0.00
2022	196,057	▲49.09%	1,732	0.00
2023	251,459	▲32.77%	2,042	0.00
2024	255,350	▲32.77%	1,926	0.00
2025	241,946	▼15.77%	1,756	0.00
