= Thai Flying Service Flight 209 =

2024 aviation accident in Thailand

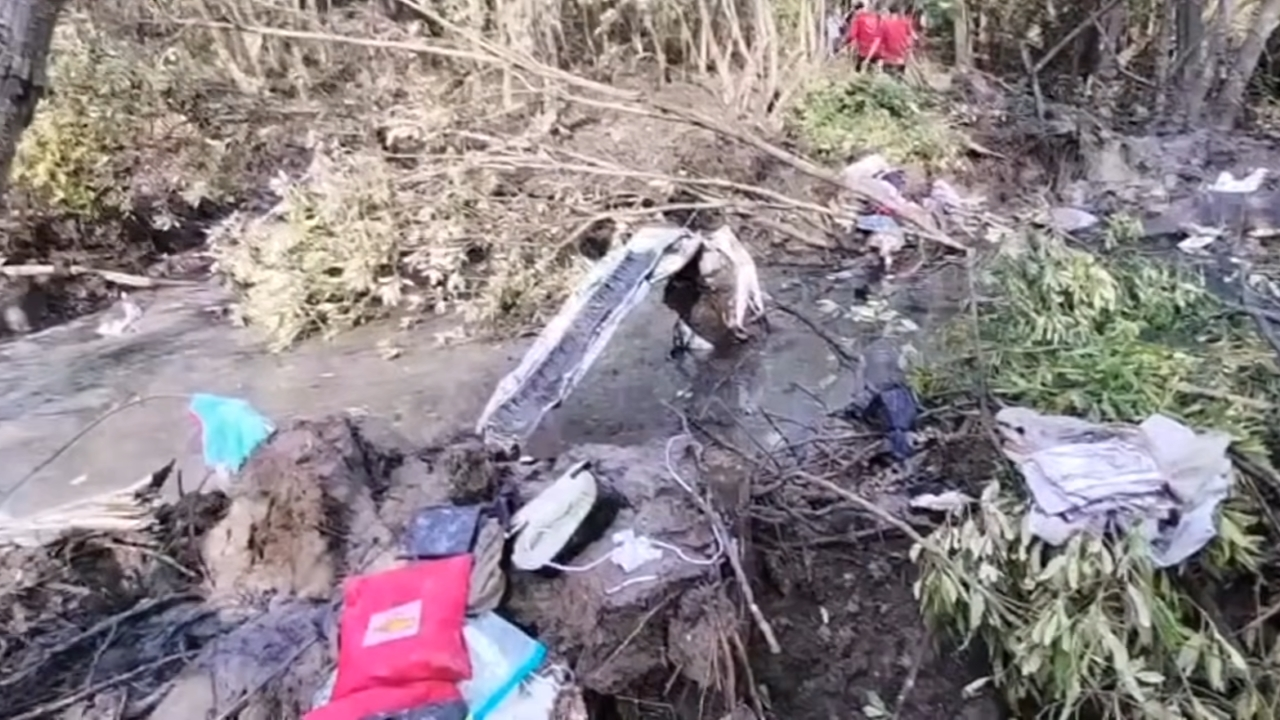
- Wreckage of the aircraft in a forest of Bang Pakong

Accident
- Date: 22 August 2024
- Summary: Crashed shortly after takeoff, under investigation
- Site: near Wat Khao Din temple, Bang Pakong district, Chachoengsao province, Thailand

Aircraft
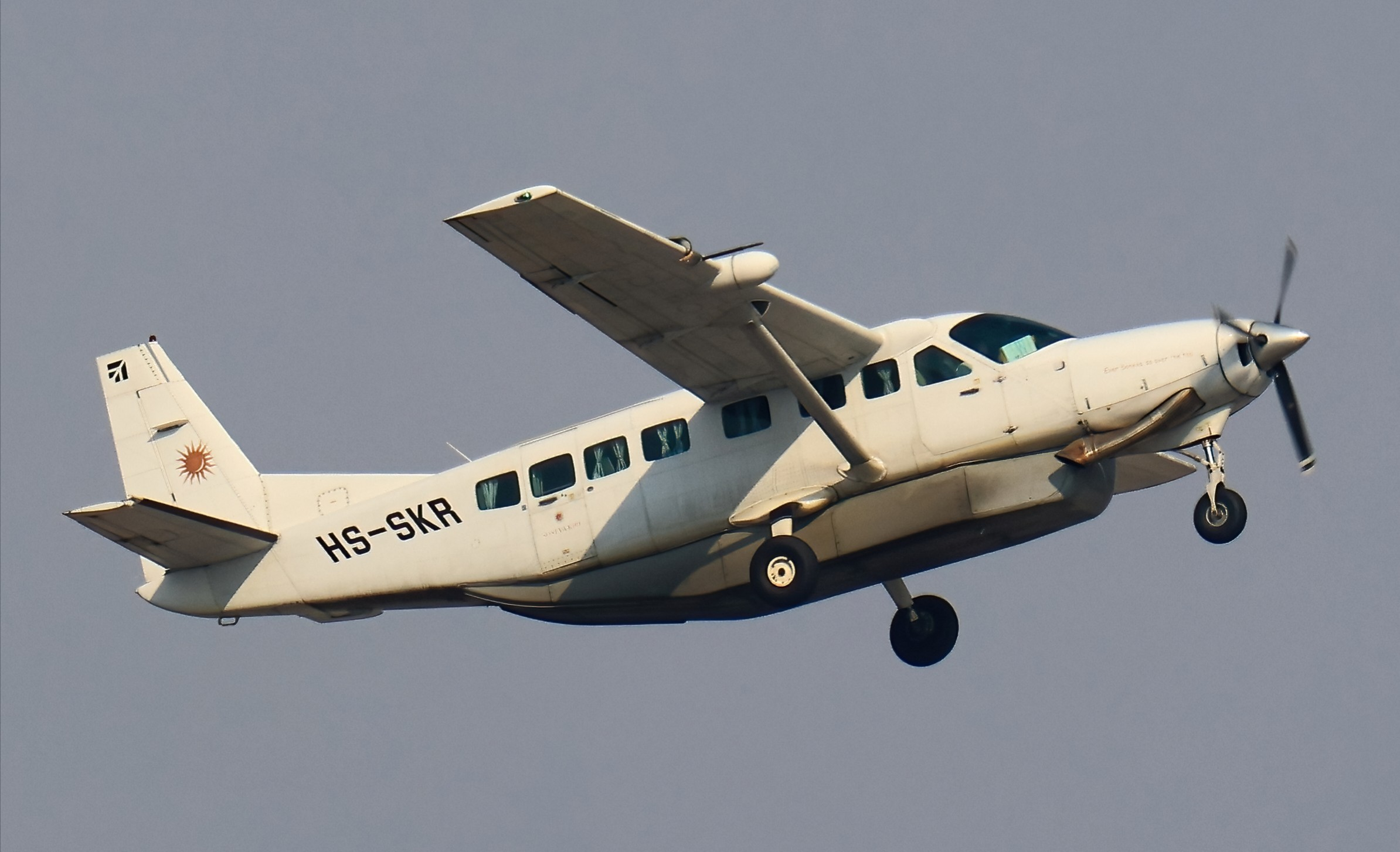
- HS-SKR, the aircraft involved in the accident, pictured in February 2024
- Aircraft type: Cessna 208B Grand Caravan
- Operator: Thai Flying Service on behalf of Soneva Kiri
- ICAO flight No.: TFT209
- Call sign: THAI FLYING 209
- Registration: HS-SKR
- Flight origin: Suvarnabhumi Airport, Bangkok, Thailand
- Destination: Soneva Kiri private airstrip, Ko Mai Si, Ko Kut district, Trat province, Thailand
- Occupants: 9
- Passengers: 7
- Crew: 2
- Fatalities: 9
- Survivors: 0

Thai Flying Service Flight 209 was a domestic Thai passenger charter flight operated by Thai Flying Service on behalf of the Soneva Kiri resort from Bangkok's Suvarnabhumi Airport to the resort's private airstrip on Ko Mai Si in Ko Kut district, Trat province. On 22 August 2024, the Cessna 208 Caravan serving the flight, with nine occupants on board, crashed shortly after taking off from Bangkok, killing all aboard.

== Background ==
=== Aircraft ===
The aircraft involved, manufactured in 2007, was a Cessna 208B Grand Caravan registered as HS-SKR with serial number 208B1241.

=== Passengers and crew ===
The flight had a crew of two Thai pilots and carried seven passengers: two Thai resort employees and five Chinese nationals, including two children.

== Accident ==
The plane was meant to fly from Bangkok to Ko Mai Si, the site of a private airstrip serving the Soneva Kiri luxury resort on the nearby island of Ko Kut. The aircraft took off at 14:46 local time, and the contact with it was lost at about 14:57 when the aircraft was about 35 kilometers southeast of Suvarnabhumi airport. The plane crashed in a mangrove swamp near the Wat Khao Din temple in Bang Pakong district of Chachoengsao province, disintegrating on impact and killing all nine on board. Local residents reported to have seen the plane diving to the ground, and then exploding in a loud bang on impact throwing fragments in a radius of at least 20 meters. Most of the bodies were dismembered, and at least 23 body parts were recovered from the crash site. The weather at the time of the flight was described as clear.

== Recovery ==
More than 300 military personnel and volunteers were deployed in the search for the aircraft, which was hampered by heavy rains. Water and mud at the site, which measured 10 meters deep and eight meters wide, were drained and removed using pumps and backhoes. Recovery operations finished on 23 August.
