= Alexander James Hamilton =

British contemporary environmental artist

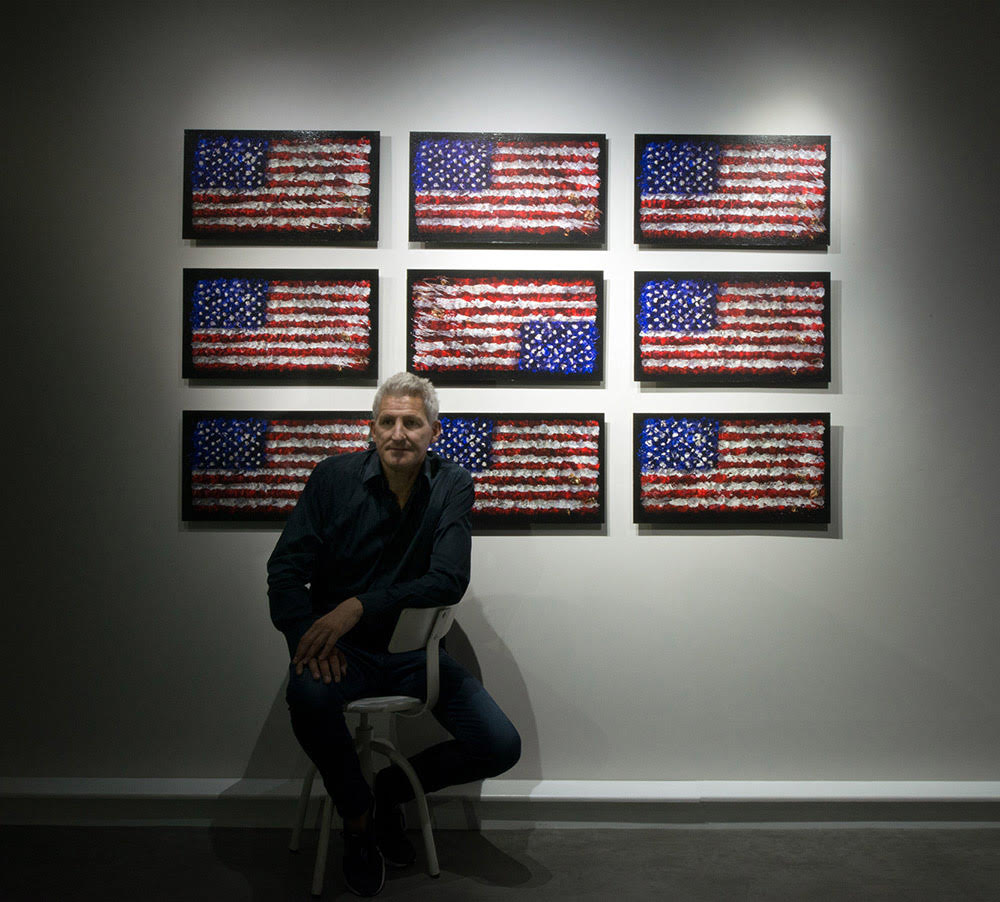
- Artist Alexander James Hamilton in front of installation at the exhibition ‘Death of the dream’, Dellasposa Gallery, London. August 2017
- Born: 2 December 1967 (age 58)
- Known for: His Vanitas, Ophelia, Oil + Water, Cymatic Water + Light, and environmental art projects
- Website: alexanderjameshamilton.com

Alexander James Hamilton (born December 2, 1967), also known as Alexander James, is a British artist and photographer whose practice investigates water, light, analogue photography and constructed physical systems. His work includes underwater still-life and figurative photography, environmental and site-specific projects, and later investigations into resonance, liquid dynamics and material transformation. He is known for the photographic series Vanitas, Ophelia, Oil + Water and Cymatic Water + Light, and for founding Distil Ennui Studio in 1990.

== Career ==
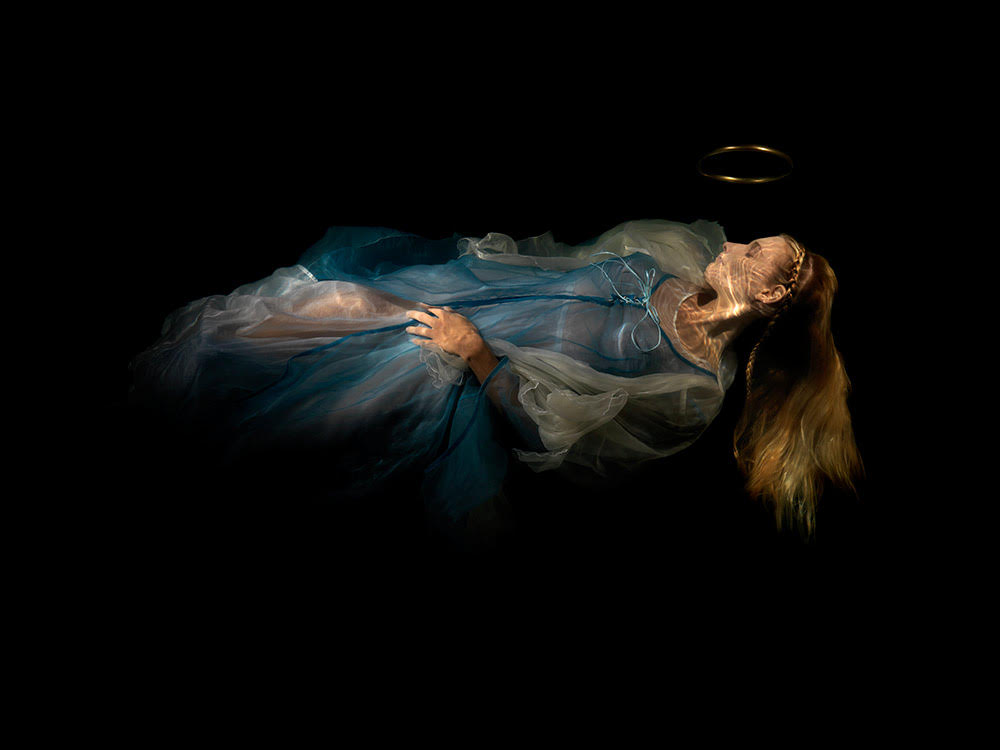
‘Witness’ from the exhibition ‘A beautiful announcement of death’ May 2012. Pertwee Anderson & Gold Gallery, London.

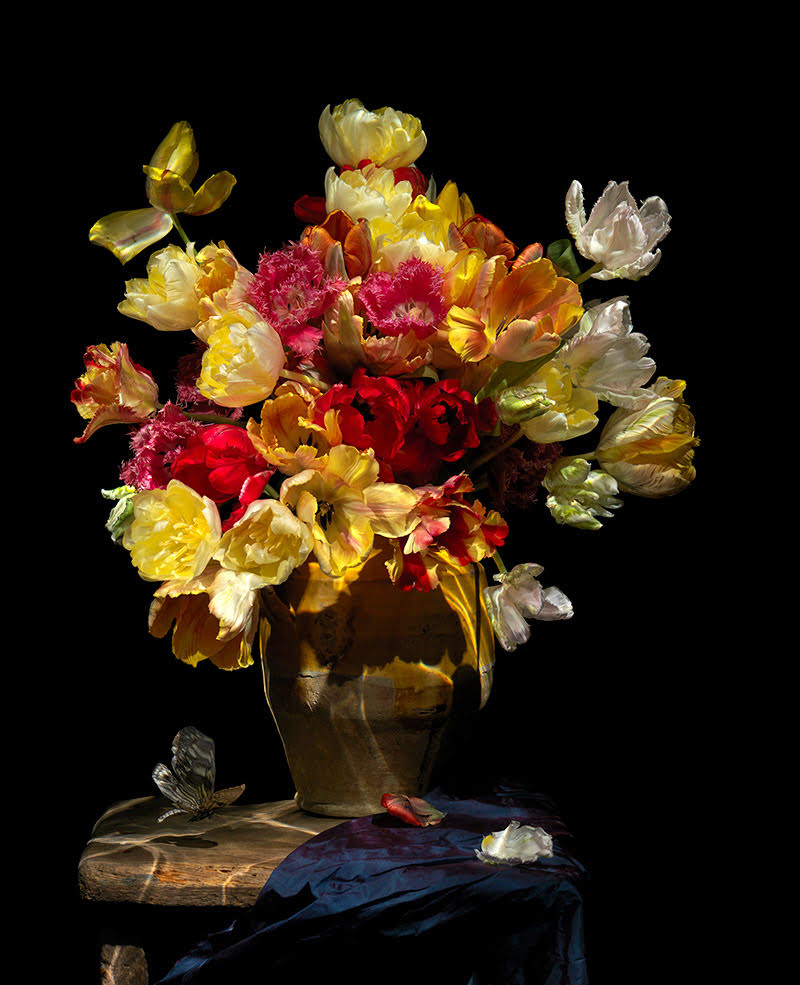
‘Grace’ from the underwater Vanitas series, dated 2010. from the exhibition ‘Intersection’ London April 2013.

Hamilton's work is noted for its intricate compositions that are submerged in large volumes of purified water, which are then photographed as still life images which retain the clarity and semblance of fine art paintings and the look of Caravaggio's Chiaroscuro. Hamilton works with the subtle distortions and reflections caused by the movement of water. He is a photographic purist, whose underwater scenes are documented only by analogue camera, without any post-production or digital editing. His work explores ‘the moral issue’ and the ‘future of the world’.

In 1990, Hamilton established the Distil Ennui Studio, the umbrella from under which he operates, exhibits and hosts artist residencies around the world mentoring young artists.

In 2014 Hamilton moved his studio to a former chocolate factory in Moscow in the "Red October" district.

In 2018, Hamilton donated a collection of his artworks from Visions from the shoreline to fund the first plastic and aluminium fully recycling facility based in Maldives.

In 2019 Hamilton established Dark Vat, an artist residency and cultural programme located within a former photographic paper factory in Krasnoyarsk, Siberia. Developed in collaboration with regional cultural organisations, the project brought together emerging artists, writers and photographers through workshops, exhibitions and studio production, exploring analogue processes, industrial heritage and contemporary artistic practice.

In 2020 Hamilton worked with the local community to re-open the last standing Baroque Carmelita Convent still standing in Spain. The convent had been closed to the public for over 170 years. Hamilton hosted the exhibition Renaciendo, the artist bequest a museum standard lighting system to the space to ensure its future public use and restoration.

== Selected works and projects ==
=== Cymatic Water + Light ===
During the 2020s Hamilton expanded his practice toward resonance-based image construction. The Cymatic Water + Light series employs liquid, light and vibration to generate temporary physical structures that are recorded photographically. Writing in Seisma, Paul Carey-Kent described the works as existing between art, science and observation, connecting photographic practice to wave behaviour, resonance and natural systems.

=== Makers Place ===
In 2021 Hamilton developed Makers Place at Soneva Fushi in the Maldives, a carbon-neutral recycling studio designed to transform waste plastic and aluminium into artworks, building materials and educational projects. Developed in partnership with Soneva and Soneva Namoona, the facility combined recycling infrastructure, environmental education and artist-led design. The project formed part of Soneva's wider sustainability programme and received international coverage for its waste-to-resource approach.

=== Renaciendo ===
In 2020, Hamilton collaborated with the community of Budia, Spain, to reopen the former Carmelite convent, which had remained closed to the public for more than 160 years. The resulting exhibition, Renaciendo, combined photography, sculpture, lighting and site-responsive installation within the historic structure. Regional media described the project as contributing to heritage conservation, cultural tourism and public engagement, while later academic commentary discussed it within the context of rural cultural regeneration.
