= Ko Mai Si =

Island in Trat province, Thailand

Coordinates: 11°43′02″N 102°31′13″E

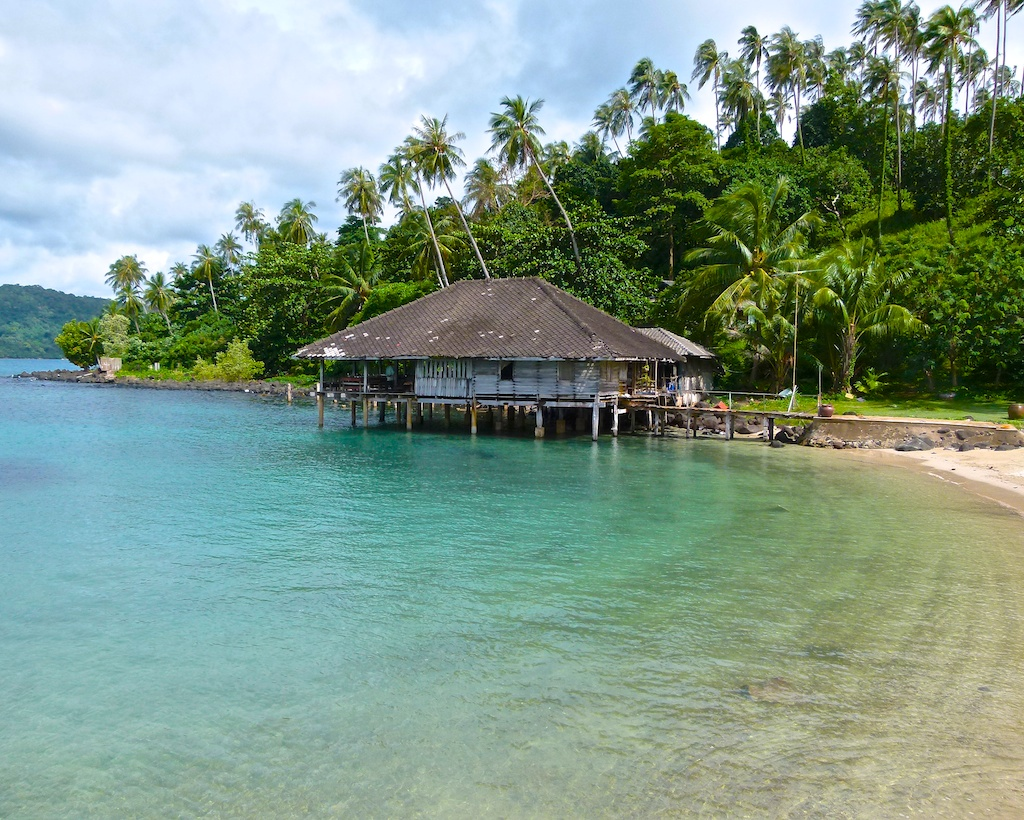
Ko Mai Si island

Ko Mai Si or Ko Mai Si Don (Thai: เกาะไม้ซี้) is a small island near Ko Kut (Thai: เกาะกูด) in Trat province, Thailand.

It is only a small island in a group of Kut islands. Ko Mai Si is located about 1 km from the island Koh Kut and has an area of about 1.6 km^{2}.

== Etymology ==
The name "Ko Mai Si" appears as 3 islands in Trat Province, which are Ko Mai Si Yai, Koh Mai Si Lek (located in Ko Chang Archipelago) and Koh Mai Si (Koh Mai Si Don in Ko Kut Archipelago). The origin of the island's name comes from a bamboo called Mai Si (Thai:ไผ่ซี้) common in Trat and Chanthaburi provinces.

== Transport ==
There are some ways to travel to Ko Mai Si.

- Speedboat from Ko Kut
- Travelling by fishing boat or speedboat from Ban Dan Kow harbor (Thai: ท่าเรือบ้านด่านเก่า) in Trat.
- Private airplane from Suvarnabhumi Airport to Ko Mai Si Airport (Soneva Kiri Hotel Private Airport).

== Tourism ==
The peak point of Ko Mai Si is in the west of this island which has a shore. A special feature of this island is a beautiful row of coral reefs. In the east, it has the pearl fishery of Mook Thai Company (Thai: บริษัท มุกไทย จำกัด) which tourists can visit but they must ask people who take care of this fishery for permission. This island has a popular sunset view point.

== Adjacent islands ==
- Ko Kut is located to the east of Ko Mai Si and it remains in its natural environment and features the beautiful Klong Chao waterfall (Thai: น้ำตกคลองเจ้า).

== See also ==
- List of islands of Thailand
- Ko Kut
