= Sonu Shivdasani =

Indian–British hotelier (born 1965)

Sonu Shivdasani OBE
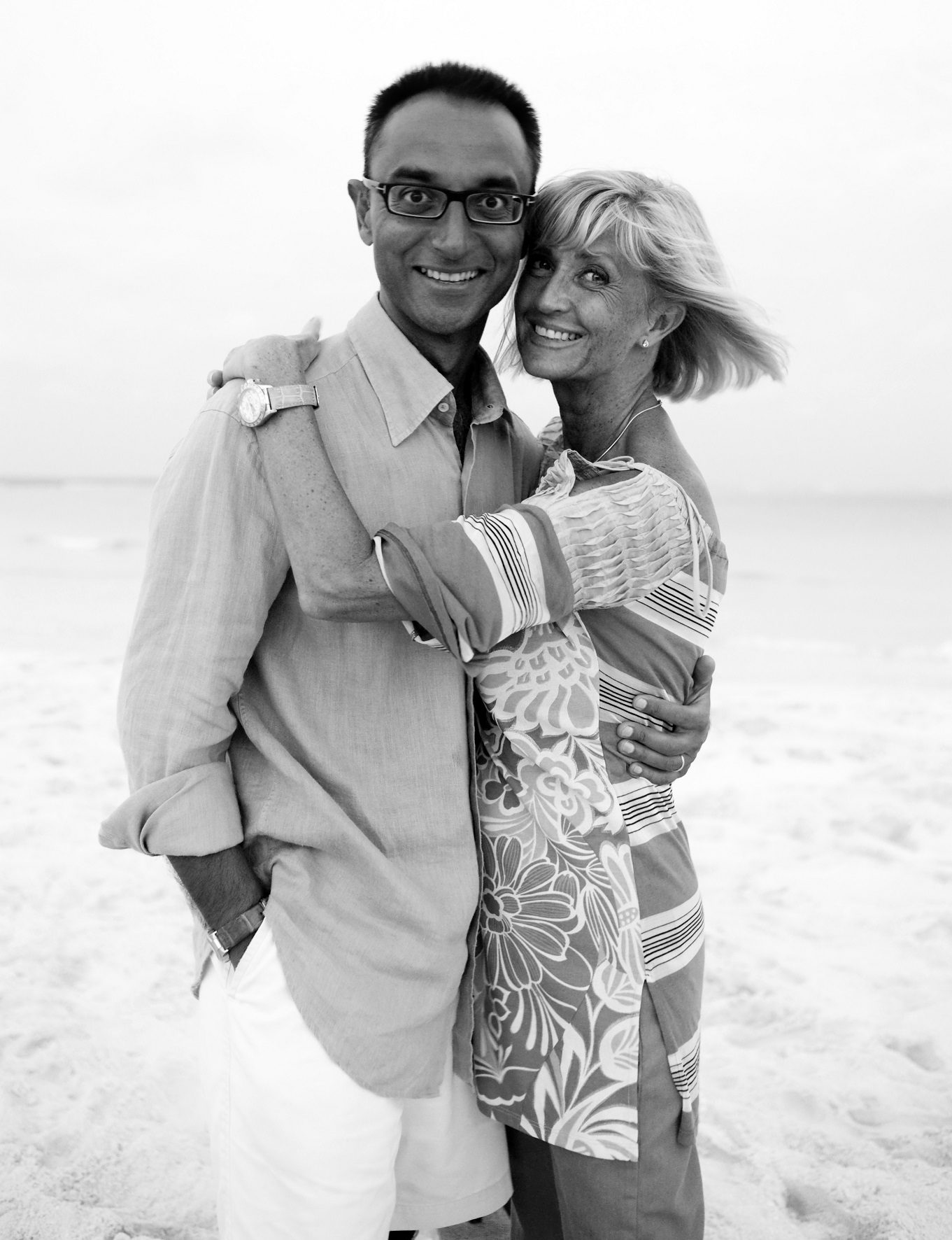
- Sonu and Eva Shivdasani by Antonina Gern
- Born: 1965 (age 60–61); India
- Occupations: Founder and CEO of Soneva
- Known for: Eco-friendly resorts in Maldives and Thailand

Sonu Shivdasani OBE (born 1965) is a British hotelier. He is the founder of the Soneva resort chain which operates luxury resorts in the Maldives and Thailand. He is also the founder and former CEO of Six Senses Resorts & Spas, which had locations throughout South East Asia and Europe, and was sold in 2012.

== Early life and education ==
Sonu was born in India. He is the youngest son of Lakshmi and Indoo Shivdasani (1918–1979), an Indian businessman who made his fortune trading in Nigeria, with his offices based in London and Geneva. His parents originated from Sindh, in modern-day Pakistan, his father immigrating to England long before the Partition of India. His grandfather was an Indian Civil Service officer during the British Raj. His father studied at Clare College, Cambridge and built a business in finance, trade and agro-allied industries in West Africa, India and Europe. His father died in 1979, when Sonu was 13, leaving his older brother Azad to look after the family business.

Sonu studied at Eton College in England and Institut Le Rosey in Switzerland. He graduated from Oxford University with an MA in English Literature in 1988.

His older sister Bina Shivdasani, Countess Sella di Monteluce (1949–2006), was a philanthropist in women's education and was the first High Sheriff of Greater London of Asian origin in 2002.

== Career ==
After graduating from Oxford, Sonu started working with his older brother Azad Shivdasani to manage their family businesses. After having worked together for two years he founded Six Senses BVI.

In 1995, Sonu and his wife Eva, who took on the role of creative director, opened Soneva Fushi resort on the Kunahandhoo island in the Maldives. They also started the Evason group of hotels and the Six Senses Resorts & Spas, with properties opening across South East Asia and Europe. In 2009 they opened Soneva Kiri on Ko Kut island in Thailand. By 2011, Six Senses expanded into an international luxury spa and resort chain with 26 resorts and 41 spas. In 2012, Sonu sold Six Senses to Pegasus Capital and shifted to focus on Soneva's resorts and private residences as part of the "One Owner, One Operator, One Philosophy, One Brand".

Sonu is one of the founders of the Soneva Foundation (previously known as the SLOWLIFE Foundation), a UK-registered charity. In 2023, Sonu was honoured as an Officer of the Order of the British Empire (OBE) for services to tourism, sustainability and charity in the King's New Year Honours 2023 Overseas and International List.

== Personal life ==
He first met Eva Malmstrom, a Swedish model, when they were introduced through his sister, the Countess Bina Sella di Monteluce, at the Monaco Grand Prix in 1986. They later married and spent their honeymoon traveling around some of the world's most exclusive hotels and resorts, inspiring them to open their own. They leased a resort in the Maldives and set about creating their dream and a few years later opened Soneva Fushi. Eva became a designer and Soneva's Creative Director and Conscience, designing interiors at their resorts in the Maldives and Thailand.

Sonu was diagnosed with cancer in 2017.

He was honored as an Officer of the Order of the British Empire by King Charles III for his contributions to "tourism, sustainability and charity" in the 2023 New Year Honours.

== Legal Matters ==
=== Collaboration with the former Maldives’ Minister of Tourism, Ahmed Adeeb ===
In 2018 Sonashah Shivdasani and his Soneva Jani Resort in the Maldives were highlighted in an OCCRP (Organized Crime and Corruption Reporting Project) report as partners to the former Minister of Tourism in the Maldives, Ahmed Adeeb. Soneva is a privately held company of Sonu Shivdasani and his wife Eva Malmstrom Shivdasani. Records show that the Shivdasanis obtained the Maldives island of Medhufaru and its surroundings, now the location of their Soneva Jani resort, via a no-bid contract in 2014.

Ahmed Adeeb, the former tourism minister of the Maldives, leased out over 50 islands and lagoons for tourism development without the public tenders the law of the Maldives normally requires. Tens of millions of dollars' worth of these lease fees were then embezzled by Adeeb and his accomplices.

The allegations against Soneva were later dropped as the processes through which Medhufaru Island and its surroundings were acquired in 2014 were in strict compliance with the legal frameworks and regulations of the Maldives. Before the development of Soneva Jani resort, which opened to guests in 2016, the conversion of the island lease from agricultural to tourism purposes was executed legally, adhering to all necessary legal and procedural standards. This was ratified through official letters from the Ministry of Tourism, Republic of Maldives, categorically exonerating both Soneva and Sonu Shivdasani from any alleged involvement in the island lease bribery and money laundering investigation into former Maldives President Abdulla Yameen and former Maldives Tourism Minister Ahmed Adeeb.

=== Soneva Kiri fire ===
The Soneva Kiri Resort, a privately held company of Sonu Shivdasani and his wife Eva Malmstrom Shivdasani, was under investigation by the Department of Special Investigation by the Natural Resources and Environment Division in Thailand. A report on the resort's safety standards were published in March 2022. A fire broke out at the Soneva Kiri Resort on Koh Kut island and gutted one of the site's villas. Incorrectly reported at the time, charges were alleged to have been brought against three executives of the resort, including Sonashah Shivdasani. The claims include causing a fire by negligence, causing damages to people's property, endangering other persons, and allowing others to use the building for hotel business without obtaining a license from the local officials. These allegations were since dropped and the case was subsequently closed. Soneva Kiri was found to operates within the legal framework established for land utilisation and environmental conservation. A memorandum from the Trat Provincial Land Office confirmed the legality of the resort's land acquisition and use. Following the fire in Villa 63 in 2021, Soneva Kiri reinforced the resort's safety measures and protocols. Throughout the investigation into the incident, Soneva Kiri fully cooperated with the authorities, as well as liaising effectively between its insurers and the family affected by the incident to reach a mutually satisfactory outcome.

=== Soneva Kiri Property Dispute ===
In March 2021, a case (KSL Capital Partners, case number 1:21-mc-00064, in the U.S. District Court for the District of Colorado) was brought by a Swiss businessman who petitioned under Section 1782 of the U.S. Code — which allows federal courts to order entities in their districts to turn over evidence to be used in certain foreign proceedings - for the court to obtain information from a private equity firm in order to pursue foreign proceedings against Sonu Shivdasani his company Bluebay Resorts (BVI) Ltd.

The Swiss businessman Jean Sebastian Ferrer Funke and his company Ecoprivate Business Ltd. alleged that Sonu Shivdasani deceived them into investing in a $6.2 million villa in Thailand and thus filed an ex parte petition for a federal court order to obtain evidence from KSL Capital Partners, a Denver-based private equity firm specializing in travel and leisure enterprises, which participated in a $230 million investment in Sonashah Shivdasani's Soneva Kiri Resort. Shivdasani was accused of running a scheme that used Bluebay as a vehicle to fraudulently induce Ferrer and Ecoprivate to purchase a Thai villa and surrounding land at the Soneva Kiri Resort for $6.2 million. The lawsuit claimed Shivdasani failed to deliver the property to them, resulting in Ferrer and Ecoprivate requesting access to KSL's documents for use in a contemplated criminal complaint against Shivdasani in Switzerland for fraud and criminal mismanagement, and for Ecoprivate to commence an arbitration proceeding against Bluebay. However, all allegations that Sonu Shivdasani made misrepresentations were dismissed by the tribunal. Some of the tribunal's key findings were: Ferrer's evidence related to Shivdasani's alleged misrepresentations were deemed unreliable; The tribunal found that Bluebay and Shivdasani did not seek to defraud Ecoprivate and Ferrer into purchasing the villa; and the tribunal found there was no illegality in the original acquisition of the resort land, accepting Shivdasani's evidence for this issue.
