= Suvarnabhumi Airport =

Main airport serving Bangkok, Thailand

Suvarnabhumi Airport ท่าอากาศยานสุวรรณภูมิ Tha-akatsayan Suwannaphum
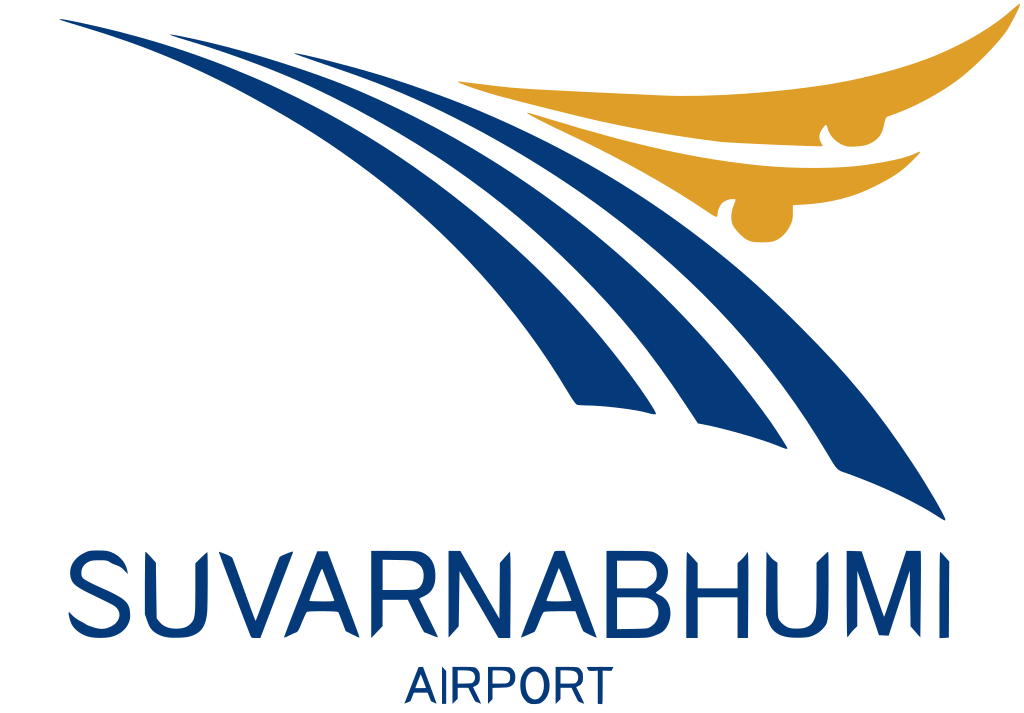

- Suvarnabhumi Airport in 2026
- IATA: BKK; ICAO: VTBS; WMO: 48429

Summary
- Airport type: Public
- Owner/Operator: Airports of Thailand
- Serves: Bangkok Metropolitan Region
- Location: Racha Thewa, Bang Phli, Samut Prakan, Thailand
- Opened: 28 September 2006; 20 years ago
- Hub for: K-Mile Air; Thai Airways International
- Focus city for: China Southern Airlines; Emirates; EVA Air
- Operating base for: Bangkok Airways; Thai AirAsia; Thai VietJet Air
- Elevation AMSL: 5 ft (1.5 m)
- Coordinates: 13°41′33″N 100°45′00″E
- Website: suvarnabhumi.airportthai.co.th

Maps
- Airport diagram

- Location in Samut Prakan province Location in Thailand Location in Southeast Asia
- Interactive map of Suvarnabhumi Airport

Runways
Direction	Length		Surface
Direction	m	ft	Surface
02R/20L	3,700	12,139	Asphalt
01/19	4,000	13,123	Asphalt
02L/20R	4,000	13,123	Asphalt

Statistics (2025)
- Total passengers: 62,902,183 ▲1.07%
- International passengers: 50,471,698 ▲0.38%
- Domestic passengers: 12,124,131 ▲4.08%
- Aircraft movements: 370,832 ▲3.82%
- Freight (tonnes): 1,529,033 ▲7.70%
- Source: Airports of Thailand

Suvarnabhumi Airport (IATA: BKK, ICAO: VTBS) is the main international airport serving Bangkok, the capital of Thailand. It is one of two airports serving Bangkok, the other being Don Mueang International Airport (DMK). Located mostly in Racha Thewa commune, Bang Phli district, Samut Prakan province, it covers an area of 3,520 ha (35.2 km^{2}; 8,700 acres), making it one of the biggest international airports in Southeast Asia, tenth biggest in the world and a regional hub for aviation. It has an Airport Rail Link, an Automated People Mover as well as being located close to Motorway 7.

Tentatively named Nong Nguhao (Note: Thai: หนองงูเห่า; lit. 'Cobra Swamp') before changing to Suvarnabhumi—a toponym that appears in many ancient Indian literary sources and Buddhist text—Suvarnabhumi is the busiest in the country, ninth busiest airport in Asia, and 20th busiest airport in the world, handling 62,234,693 passengers in 2024. As of 2025, it is served by the most airlines in the world, with 113 airlines operating from the airport.

The airport serves as a primary hub for Thai Airways International and K-Mile Air, and an operating base for Bangkok Airways, Thai VietJet Air and Thai AirAsia. It serves as a regional gateway and connecting point for various foreign carriers connecting to Asia, Oceania, Europe, and Africa. The airport is operated by Airports of Thailand.

== Etymology ==
The name Suvarṇabhūmi, derived from the Sanskrit words suvarṇa (gold) and bhūmi (land), literally means "land of gold". (Note: Sanskrit: सुवर्णभूमि Suvarṇabhūmi, IPA: [suʋɐrɳɐbʰuːmi], Suvarṇa is "gold", Bhūmi is 'land', thus Suvaṇṇabhūmi literally means "land of gold"; Spelled in various local languages as: Pali: Suvaṇṇabhūmi, IPA: [suʋɐɳːɐbʰuːmi]; Malay: Suwarna Bumi; Burmese: သုဝဏ္ဏဘူမိ [θṵwʊ̀ɰ̃na̰bùmḭ]; Khmer: សុវណ្ណភូមិ [soʔ.ʋan.naʔ.pʰuːm]; and Thai: สุวรรณภูมิ, RTGS: Suwannaphum.) The name was chosen by King Bhumibol Adulyadej (Rama IX) whose name includes Bhūmi, referring to the "Buddhist golden kingdom", thought to have been to the east of the Ganges, possibly somewhere in Southeast Asia. In Thailand, government proclamations and national museums insist that Suvarnabhumi was somewhere on the coast of the central plains, near the ancient city of U Thong, which might be the origin of the Indianised Dvaravati culture. Although the claims have not been substantiated, the Thai government named the new Bangkok airport Suvarnabhumi Airport, in celebration of this tradition.

== History ==
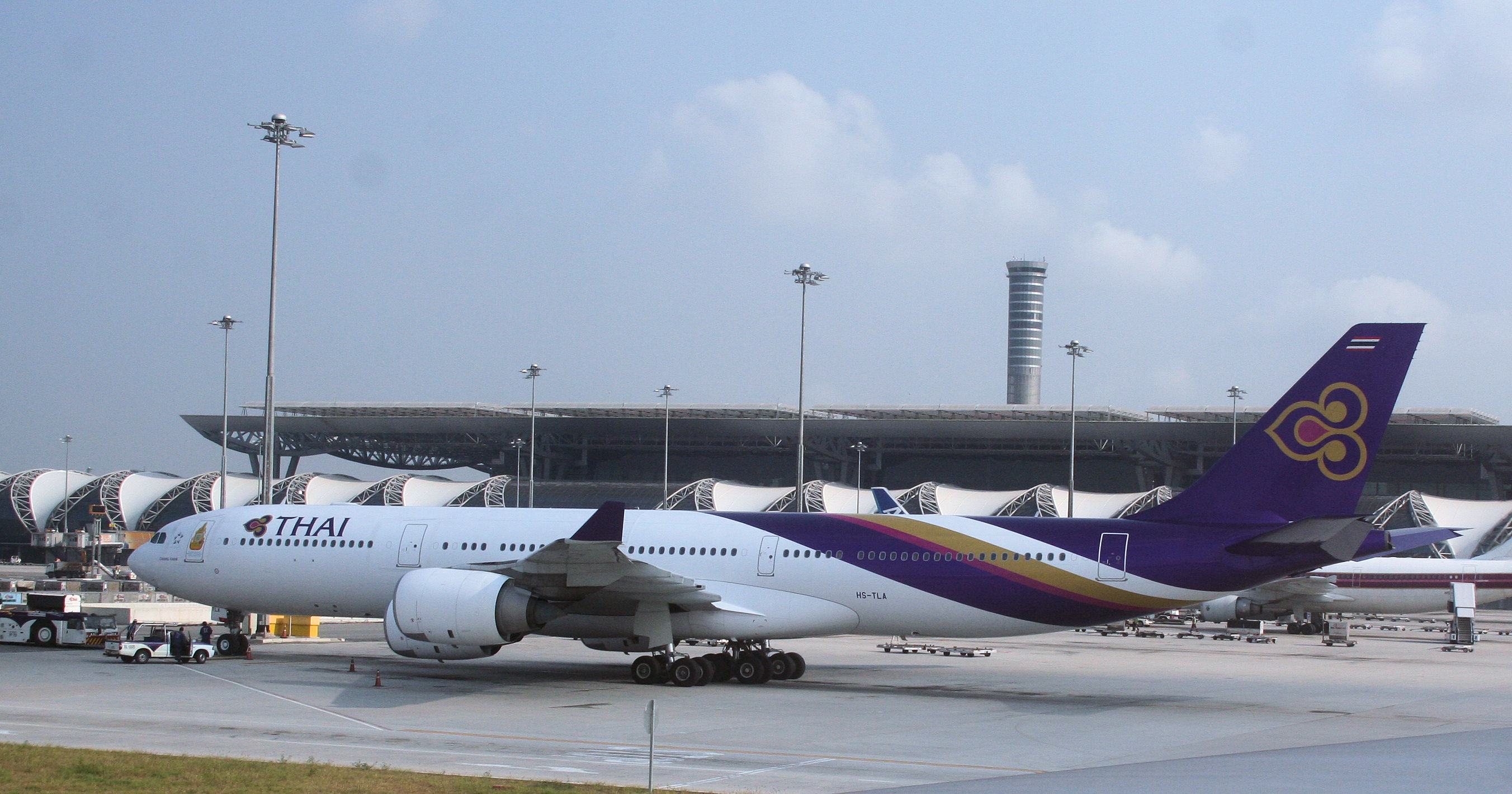
A Thai Airbus A340-500 (HS-TLA, Chiang Kham) at Suvarnabhumi Airport in 2008

Suvarnabhumi was officially opened for limited domestic flight service on 15 September 2006, and opened for most domestic and all international commercial flights on 28 September 2006.

The airport is located on what had formerly been known as Nong Nguhao in Racha Thewa in Bang Phli, Samut Prakan province, as well as the districts of Bang Kapi, Lat Krabang, Bang Na, and Prawet in the eastern side of Bangkok, about 25 kilometres (16 mi) from downtown. The terminal building was designed by Helmut Jahn of Murphy/Jahn Architects. It was constructed primarily by ITO JV. The airport had the world's tallest free-standing control tower (132.2 metres or 434 feet) from 2006 to 2014.

Suvarnabhumi was reassigned the IATA airport code, BKK, from Don Mueang after that airport ceased international commercial flights. Motorway 7 connects the airport, Bangkok, and the heavily industrial eastern seaboard of Thailand, where most export manufacturing takes place.

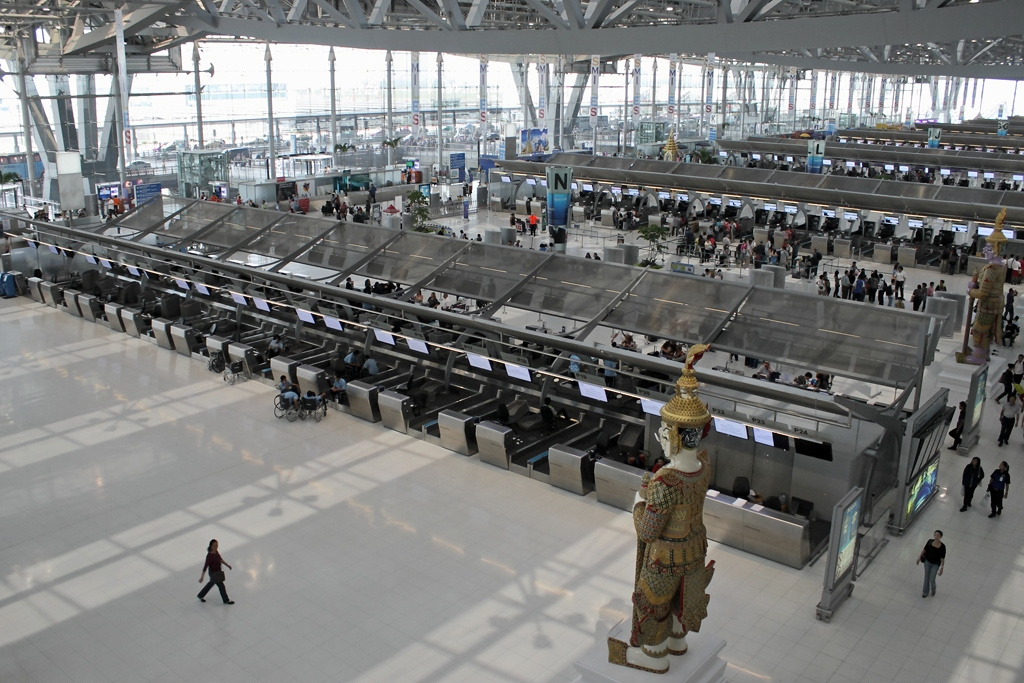
Check-in hall at Suvarnabhumi Airport, seen from the upper level

During the COVID-19 pandemic, the airport was temporarily converted to a hospital and vaccination center.

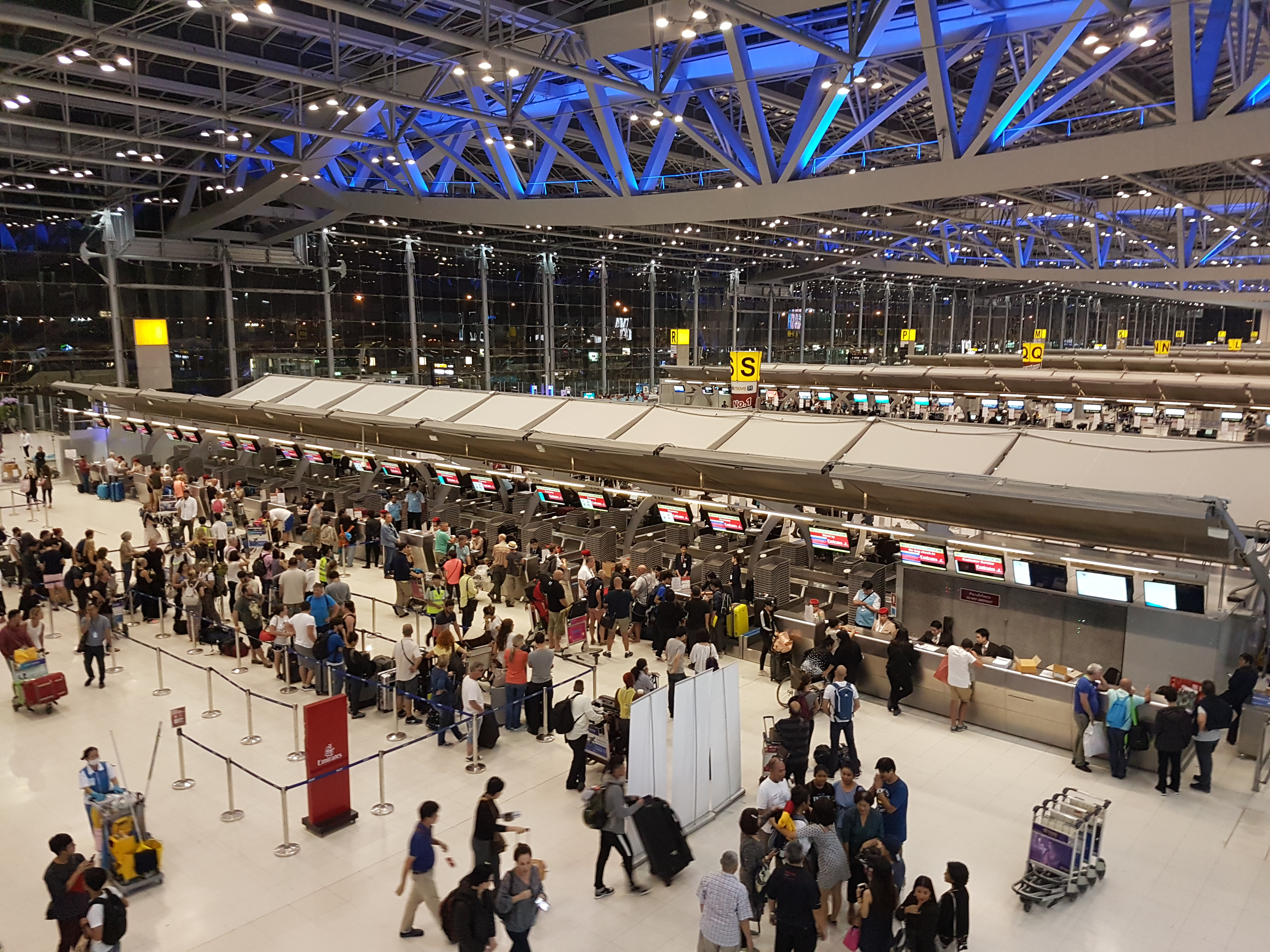
Check-in hall

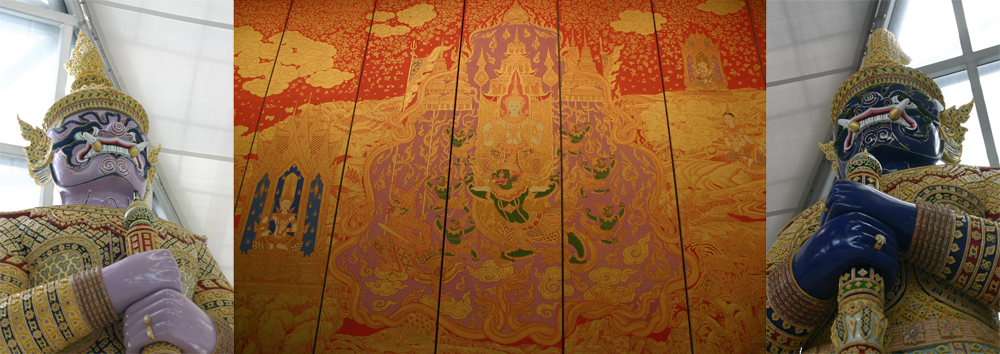
Art pieces at Suvarnabhumi Airport

=== Land purchase, initial early phase of construction ===
"The Japanese government would end up assisting the new airport project as ODA, and in 1996, the project took a step forward with the signing of a loan agreement between the Government of Thailand and the Japanese government. Then, in 1996, Second Bangkok International Airport Company Ltd. (SBIA) was established as the project implementation organization, and the project got underway."

It was scheduled to finish by 2000.

=== Airport tests and official opening ===
The airport was due to open in late 2004. Still, a series of budget overruns, construction flaws, and allegations of corruption plagued the project.

A further delay was caused by the discovery that the airport had been built over an old graveyard. Superstitious construction workers claimed to have seen ghosts there. On 23 September 2005, the Thai airport authority held a ceremony where 99 Buddhist monks chanted to appease the spirits.

Full tests of the airport took place on 3 and 29 July 2006. Six local airlines—Thai Airways International, Nok Air, Thai AirAsia, Bangkok Airways, PBair, and One-Two-Go Airlines—used the airport as a base for twenty domestic flights.

Suvarnabhumi officially opened at 03:00 on 28 September 2006, taking over all flights from Don Mueang. The first flight to arrive was a Lufthansa Cargo flight LH8442 from Mumbai at 03:05. The first Asian commercial arrival was Japan Airlines at 03:30. The next arrival was Aerosvit flight VV171 from Kyiv at 04:30, and the first cargo departure was Saudi Arabian Airlines flight SV-984 to Riyadh at 05:00. Aerosvit also had the first passenger departure (VV172 to Kyiv) around 05:30.

=== Initial difficulties ===
Difficulties were reported in the first few days of the airport's operation. On the first day alone, sluggish luggage handling was common—the first passenger arrival by Aerosvit took an hour for the luggage to start coming out, and some flights did not have their luggage coming out even after four hours. Flights were delayed (Thai Airways claimed that 17 of 19 flights were delayed that day), and there were failures with the check-in system. Subsequent problems included the failure of the cargo computer system, and the departure boards displaying the wrong information, resulting in confused passengers (unlike Don Mueang, there were no "final calls" issued).

Months after its opening, issues of congestion, construction quality, signage, provision of facilities, and soil subsidence continued to plague the project, prompting calls to reopen Don Mueang to allow for repairs to be made. Expert opinions varied widely on the extent of Suvarnabhumi's problems as well as their root cause. Most airlines stated that damage to the airport was minimal. Prime Minister Surayud Chulanont reopened Don Mueang for domestic flights voluntarily on 16 February 2007, with 71 weekly flights moved back initially, but no international flights.

=== Capacity and safety issues ===
==== Tarmac problems ====
In January 2007, ruts were discovered in the runways at Suvarnabhumi. The east runway was scheduled to close for repairs. Expert opinions varied as to the cause of the ruts. Airport authorities and airline representatives maintained that the airport was still safe and resisted suggestions that the airport should be completely closed and all flights moved back to Don Mueang.

On 27 January 2007, the Department of Civil Aviation declined to renew the airport's safety certificate, which had expired the previous day. The ICAO requires that international airports hold aerodrome safety certificates, but Suvarnabhumi continued to operate because the ICAO requirement had yet to be adopted as part of Thai law.

As of early 2016, tarmac problems persisted at Suvarnabhumi. Soft spots on the tarmac, taxiways, and apron area had not been permanently fixed. Aircraft were getting stuck on the soft surfaces that are the result of sub-standard materials. "The constant resurfacing of the tarmac, taxiways and apron area with asphalt is an unacceptable patchwork solution. We literally need a "concrete" solution", said Tony Tyler, IATA's director general and CEO.

==== Plans to re-open Don Mueang for domestic flights ====
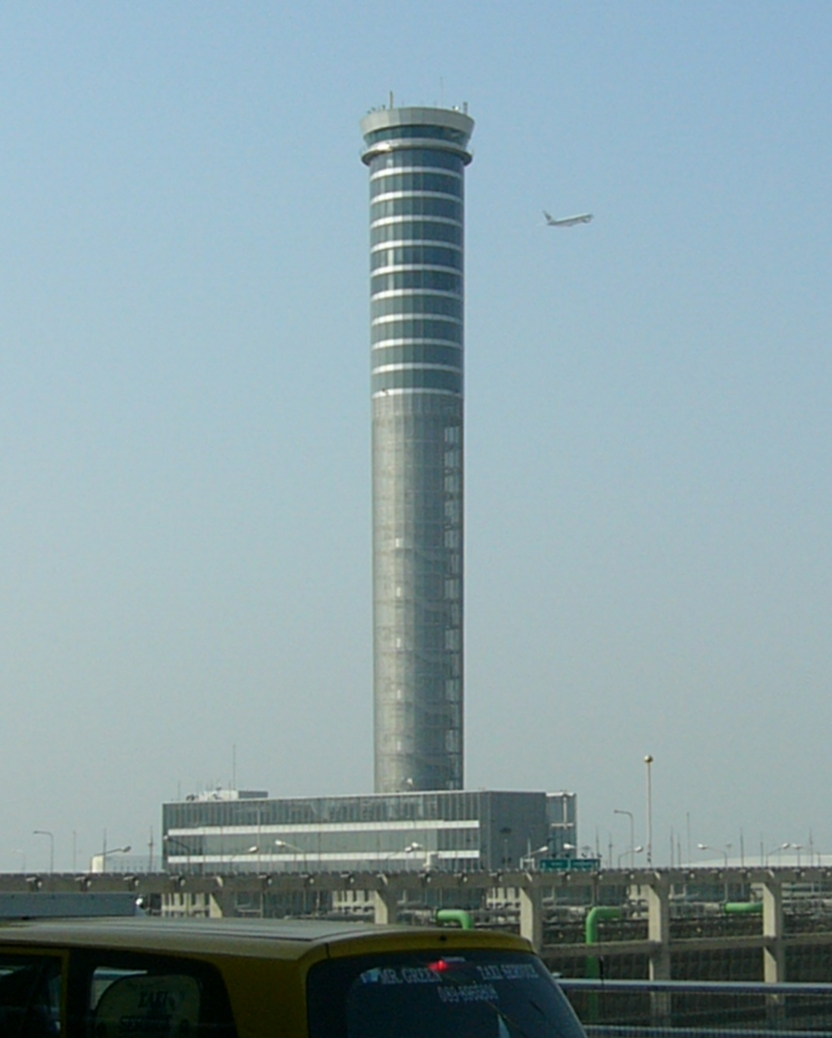
Airport traffic control tower (ATCT) at Suvarnabhumi Airport. At 132.2 meters, it is the world's third tallest ATC tower

In January 2007, Thai Airways announced a plan to move some of its domestic operations back to Don Mueang International Airport due to overcrowding. Three days later, the Ministry of Transport recommended temporarily reopening Don Mueang while repair work on the runways at Suvarnabhumi proceeded. At that time, Thai Airways said it would shift most of its domestic flights back to Don Mueang while keeping flights with high international passenger connections such as Chiang Mai and Phuket at Suvarnabhumi. On 28 March 2009, Thai Airways discontinued all domestic flights from Don Mueang. Bangkok Airways and One-Two-GO Airlines had similar plans, but Bangkok Airways remained at Suvarnabhumi. Thai AirAsia said it would not move unless it could shift both its international and domestic operations, prompting them to stay at Suvarnabhumi for the time being. Nok Air and PBair were undecided, but Nok Air later relocated all flights to Don Mueang, where they operate today. As of January 2010, only Nok Air and One-Two-GO operated domestic flights from Don Mueang Airport. PBair have ceased operations altogether. One-Two-GO was integrated into Orient Thai Airlines in July 2010, but continued to operate from Don Mueang Airport until liquidation in 2018. As of 1 October 2012, Air Asia has moved all of its Bangkok operations to Don Mueang International Airport (DMK) from Suvarnabhumi Airport (BKK).

==== Repair and upgrades ====
Airports of Thailand found that the cost of fixing 60 identified problems at the airport would be less than one percent of the total airline cost and the problems could be fixed in four to five years. Dr Narupol Chaiyut, a member of a committee overseeing service problems at the new airport, estimated that 70 percent of the problems would be fixed in 2007. Twenty of the sixty problems were successfully fixed by February 2007.

==== Installation of safety glass barriers ====
In September 2013, following a series of fatal falls, Airports of Thailand allocated 30 million baht to install 2.5-meter-high glass barriers along the fourth-floor departure hall. This measure was implemented to enhance safety standards after three incidents occurred within a five-month period. Although the installation significantly reduced the frequency of incidents in this area, sporadic attempts continued as individuals sought to circumvent the barriers or access other zones. In response, the airport maintained strict surveillance protocols, which facilitated successful interventions by security personnel in later years.

== Architectural design ==
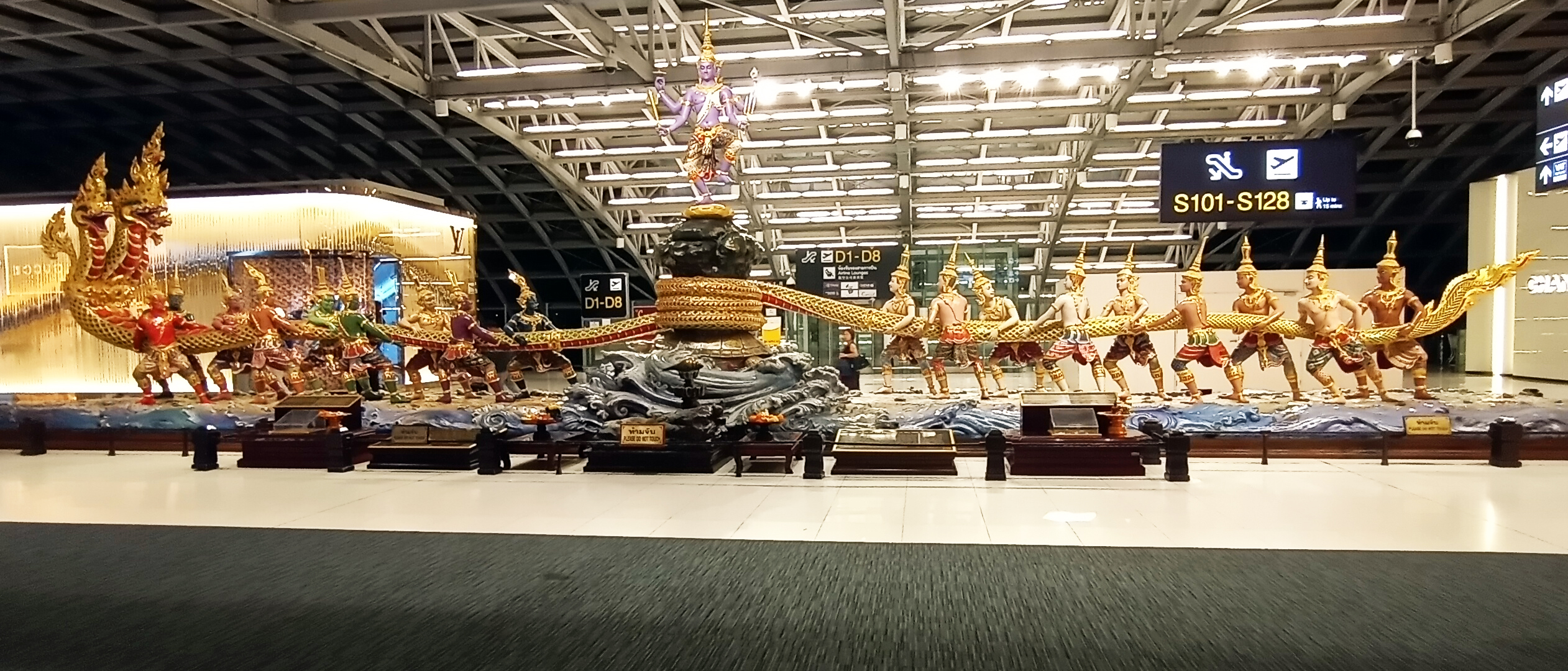
A depiction of the "Churning of the Ocean of Milk", Samudra manthana, at the airport

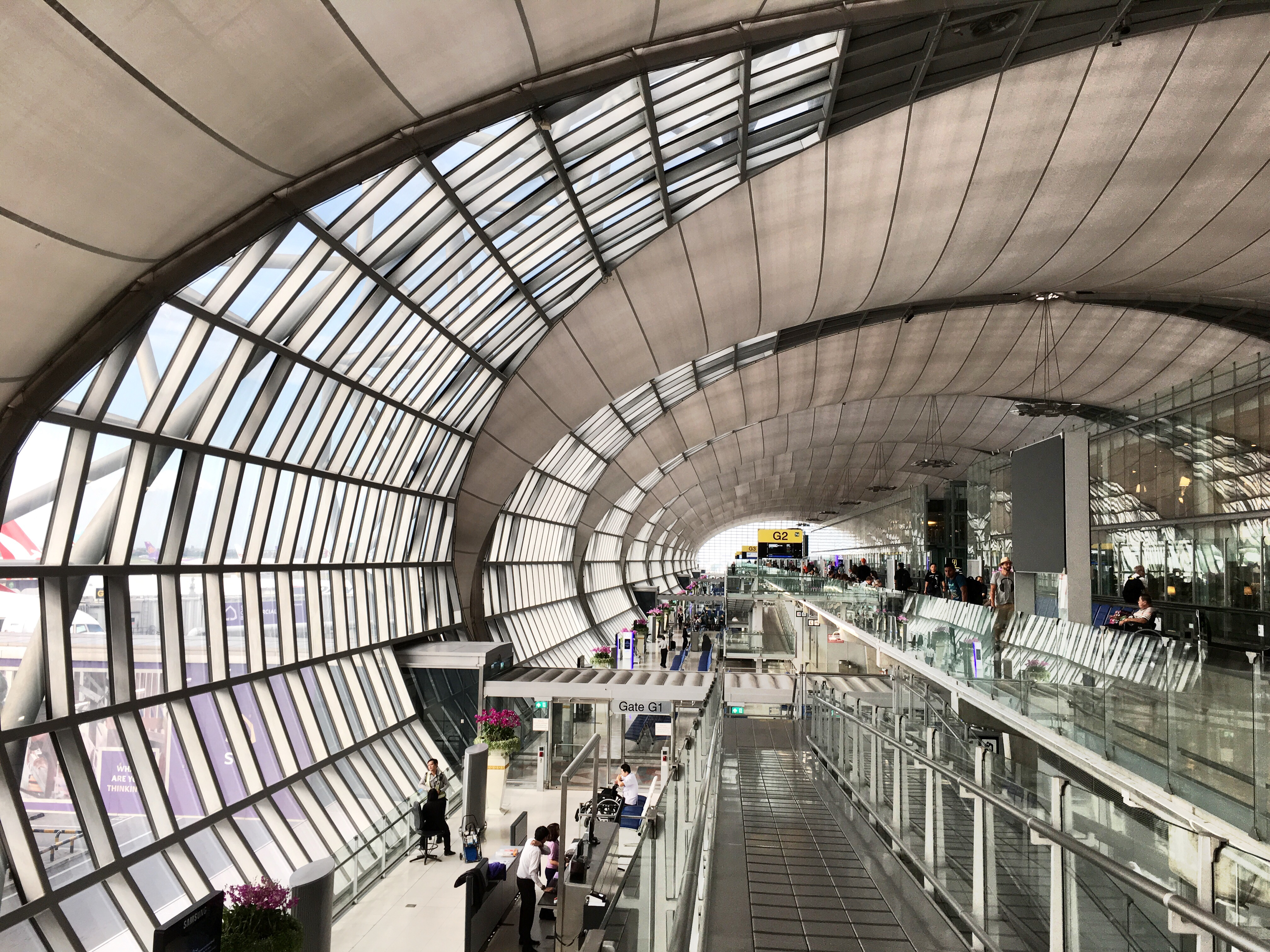
Concourse design: 5-pin arch-truss-girders with glazed facades and a translucent fabric membrane set-up, spanning across to bridge the 27 m spacing between the glass facades

Suvarnabhumi Airport's main terminal roof is designed with structural elements and bays placed in a cantilevered, wavelike form to appear to "float" over the concourse beneath. This overall design principle was to express the former essence of the site, from which water had to be drained before construction could begin. The eight composite 2,710-ton trusses supporting the canopy of the main terminal are essentially diagrams of the bending moments acting on them, with the greatest depth at mid-span and over the supports.

The result of Helmut Jahn's vision is a structure with performance materials serve in their total composition and in use more than in their conventional roles. This maximizes daylight use in comfort with substantial energy life-cycle cost savings. The installed cooling system reduced up to 50 percent compared to a conventional system. A translucent membrane with three layers was developed to mediate between the interior and exterior climate, dealing with noise and temperature transmission, while still allowing natural flow of daylight into building along with views of greenery outside.

== Airport ranking ==
Bangkok departure Eva B777 300ER

The airport was ranked number 48 among the world's top 100 airports in 2020. Other ASEAN airports in 2020 were ranked: Changi Airport, 1; Jakarta Soekarno–Hatta, 35; Kuala Lumpur International Airport, 63; Hanoi, 87. Suvarnabhumi was ranked 46 in 2019, 38 in 2017 and 36 in 2016. According to the Thailand Development Research Institute (TDRI) in 2018, the airport's ranking had not improved over the past six years. Customer complaints included lengthy immigration waiting times, transit day room issues, insufficient numbers of chairs and phone charging points, insufficient English-speaking staff, and poor information displays.

As of 23 March 2026, the airport was ranked 36th by the Skytrax World Airport Awards 2026.

== Events ==
- On 25 January 2007, due to work upgrading the taxiways which suffered from small cracks, a few incoming flights were delayed and several flights were safely diverted to U-Tapao International Airport in Rayong Province.
- On 26 November 2008, an illegal occupation of the airport took place by People's Alliance for Democracy, closing the departure lounge and blocking exits and leaving almost 3,000 passengers stranded in the main terminal and another 350,000 stranded inside the country, as all flights were grounded. The People's Alliance for Democracy seized the control tower at 12:00. On 2 December 2008, protesters agreed to leave the airport as they had been illegally protesting and permitted the resumption of flights. Security checks, clean-ups, and re-certification once the illegal occupation ended delayed the airport from being fully functional until 5 December 2008.
- On 5 January 2019, the airport gained international attention when a Saudi Arabian ex-Muslim, Rahaf Mohammed, fleeing an abusive family that punished children who did not follow their religion, was accosted by Thai authorities at the behest of Saudi Arabia and sent to one of the airport's hotels to await repatriation back to her family and country. Fearing that she could be killed for being a disgrace to her family and religion, she barricaded herself in the hotel room, opened a Twitter account to plead for her freedom, and requested assistance from United Nations agents to get her to the Western world, away from her family, as a resettled refugee. As her pleas for help went viral, Thai agents agreed to let her go to Canada to start a new life without Islam.
- In January 2021, a motorist drove his car through security gates and onto the tarmac at the airport while it was in use. It was later revealed that the driver had been under the influence of methamphetamine, which was also discovered in the trunk of the car. The driver claimed that he had taken a wrong turn.
- On 31 January 2025, Emirates opened a lounge on the 4th floor in SAT-1 (Satellite 1 Terminal). It is the largest outside of Dubai International Airport.

== Facilities ==
=== Airport terminal ===
Costing an estimated 155 billion baht (US$5 billion), the airport has three parallel runways (60 m wide, 4,000 m and 3,700 m long) and two parallel taxiways to accommodate simultaneous departures and arrivals.

The main passenger terminal building, with a capacity of handling 76 flight operations per hour, co-locates the international and domestic terminals, though assigning them to different parts of the concourse. In the initial phase of construction, it was capable of handling 45 million passengers and three million tonnes of cargo per year. The airport's main passenger terminal was, at the time of construction, the world's largest passenger terminal ever constructed in one phase at 563,000 square metres (6,060,000 sq ft). The airport air-traffic control tower was the tallest in the world at 135 metres (443 ft) from 2006 to 2014.

=== Hotel ===
A 600-room hotel, now operated as Hyatt Regency, is located above the airport rail link station and in front of the main passenger terminal building. It originally opened in 2006 as Novotel, but was rebranded as Hyatt Regency in February 2025.

=== Expansion plans ===
Suvarnabhumi Airport map based on OSM graphics, actualized up to mid-2023

By mid-2015, the airport was handling more than 800 flights per day, higher than its 600-flight capacity. It has exceeded its capacity of 45 million passengers per year.

Airports of Thailand (AOT) approved an investment budget for the expansion of Suvarnabhumi Airport and construction was expected to be completed by April 2023. The plan was to strengthen Suvarnabhumi Airport's position as a regional aviation hub. Phase Two would raise the airport's capacity to 65 million passengers a year and would be undertaken in parallel with the construction of a new domestic terminal. The new domestic terminal will be intended to accommodate more than 30 million passengers annually by 2027.

The two expansion projects are part of the overall airport enlargement that would see Suvarnabhumi raise its annual passenger handling capacity to 125 million passengers, 90 million international and 35 million domestic passengers by 2024 at an estimated cost of 163 billion baht (US$5.25 billion/€3.62 billion). The expansion includes the construction of one additional runway of 3,700 metres (12,100 ft), subsequent enlargement of domestic and international terminals, and improvements to parking bays, car parks, and other airport infrastructure.

In March 2024, Prime Minister Srettha Thavisin said the third runway would open in October 2024, with a long-term target capacity of 150 million passengers. The runway was opened for full aircraft operations on 1 November 2024, increasing the operational capacity from 68 to 94 flights/hour.

==== Midfield Satellite Concourse 1 (SAT-1) ====
A new midfield concourse called SAT-1 partially opened in September 2023 and was fully opened from early 2024. It is linked to the current main terminal via an underground automated people mover (APM) system titled Suvarnabhumi Airport Automated People Mover. (Note: Thai: ระบบขนส่งผู้โดยสารอัตโนมัติท่าอากาศยานสุวรรณภูมิ) The new people mover was provided by Siemens using the NeoVAL technology. The new satellite terminal has a total of 28 gates, with eight for the Airbus A380 and Boeing 747-8 super jumbo jet. Spanning around 251,400 square meters, it will increase the airport's annual passenger handling capacity from 45 million to 60 million. The SAT-1 terminal was nominated as one of six airport terminals for the Prix Versailles World's Most Beautiful Airports Architectural Award for 2024, which was announced at UNESCO.

==== Future expansion projects (2025 onwards) ====
On 29 October 2024, it was reported that Airports of Thailand Public Company Limited (AOT) revised Suvarnabhumi's masterplan for expansion. The revision included cancelling a planned second Midfield Satellite Concourse (which would have been south of the existing satellite concourse) in favor of a massive new terminal on the airport's southern end. AOT made the revision due to fears that a second Midfield Satellite Concourse would not be enough to meet future demand. The new South Terminal will cost 120 billion baht ($3.7 billion USD) and have a capacity of 70 million passengers annually. It is set to open by the end of 2031. Alongside the new South Terminal, AOT is also planning the east terminal expansion project, which will add 81,000 square meters of space for passengers. Lastly, AOT has confirmed a fourth runway to be constructed east of Runway 1/19. The new runway will cost 20 billion baht ($615 million USD) and will be at least 12,000 feet in length, similar to the other runways at Suvarnabhumi. Bidding for contracts for the fourth runway is set to open in 2027, likely meaning that the runway will be completed alongside the new South Terminal. When fully complete, these projects will allow Suvarnabhumi Airport to serve 150 million passengers every year.

== Airlines and destinations ==
=== Passenger ===
Airlines	Destinations
9 Air	Guangzhou, Guiyang
Aeroflot	Irkutsk, Khabarovsk, Krasnoyarsk, Moscow–Sheremetyevo, Novosibirsk, Saint Petersburg, Vladivostok, Yekaterinburg
Air Arabia	Sharjah
Air Astana	Almaty, Astana (resumes 11 December 2026)
Air Austral	Saint-Denis de La Réunion
Air Busan	Busan
Air Cambodia	Phnom Penh
Air Canada	Vancouver
Air China	Beijing–Capital, Beijing–Daxing, Chengdu–Tianfu, Hangzhou, Shanghai–Pudong
Air France	Paris–Charles de Gaulle
Air India	Delhi–Indira Gandhi, Mumbai–Shivaji
Air India Express	Bengaluru, Indore (begins 2 December 2026), Kochi, Pune, Varanasi, Visakhapatnam
Air Premia	Seoul–Incheon
Air Travel	Changsha
Aircalin	Nouméa, Paris–Charles de Gaulle
All Nippon Airways	Tokyo–Haneda, Tokyo–Narita
Arkia	Tel Aviv
Asiana Airlines	Seoul–Incheon
Austrian Airlines	Vienna
Bangkok Airways	Chiang Mai, Koh Samui, Krabi, Luang Prabang, Malé (resumes 28 March 2027), Phnom Penh, Phuket, Siem Reap, Sukhothai, Trat
Beijing Capital Airlines	Hangzhou, Nanjing
Belavia	Minsk
Bhutan Airlines	Gaya, Kolkata, Paro
Biman Bangladesh Airlines	Dhaka
British Airways	London–Gatwick
Cambodia Airways	Phnom Penh
Cathay Pacific	Hong Kong
Cebu Pacific	Clark, Manila
Centrum Air	Tashkent
Chengdu Airlines	Chengdu–Tianfu
China Airlines	Kaohsiung, Taipei–Taoyuan
China Eastern Airlines	Beijing–Daxing, Chengdu–Tianfu, Guangzhou, Kunming, Lanzhou, Nanjing, Shanghai–Pudong, Taiyuan, Wuhan
China Southern Airlines	Guangzhou, Jieyang, Shenzhen
Chongqing Airlines	Chongqing
Condor	Frankfurt, Sanya; Seasonal charter: Denpasar
Drukair	Paro, Siliguri
Eastar Jet	Seoul–Incheon
El Al	Tel Aviv
Emirates	Da Nang, Dubai–International, Hong Kong, Siem Reap
Ethiopian Airlines	Addis Ababa
Etihad Airways	Abu Dhabi
EVA Air	Amsterdam, London–Heathrow Taipei–Taoyuan, Vienna
Finnair	Helsinki, Melbourne
Garuda Indonesia	Jakarta–Soekarno-Hatta
Greater Bay Airlines	Hong Kong
Gulf Air	Bahrain
GX Airlines	Nanning
Hainan Airlines	Beijing–Capital, Chongqing, Haikou
HK Express	Hong Kong
Hong Kong Airlines	Hong Kong
Iberojet	Seasonal: Madrid
IndiGo	Bengaluru, Bhubaneswar, Chennai, Delhi–Indira Gandhi, Gaya, Guwahati, Hyderabad, Kolkata, Mumbai–Shivaji
ITA Airways	Rome–Fiumicino
Japan Airlines	Osaka–Kansai, Tokyo–Haneda, Tokyo–Narita
Jeju Air	Busan, Seoul–Incheon
Jetstar	Brisbane, Melbourne, Perth
Jin Air	Busan, Seoul–Incheon
Juneyao Air	Shanghai–Pudong
Kenya Airways	Guangzhou, Nairobi–Jomo Kenyatta
KLM	Amsterdam
Korean Air	Seoul–Incheon
Kuwait Airways	Kuwait City
Lao Airlines	Luang Prabang, Vientiane
Loong Air	Hangzhou, Wenzhou
LOT Polish Airlines	Warsaw–Chopin; Seasonal charter: Katowice
Lufthansa	Munich
Mahan Air	Tehran–Imam Khomeini
Malaysia Airlines	Kuala Lumpur–International
Maldivian	Malé (resumes 8 December 2026); Seasonal: Shenzhen
MIAT Mongolian Airlines	Ulaanbaatar
Myanmar Airways International	Mandalay, Yangon
Myanmar National Airlines	Yangon
Neos	Charter: Prague
Nepal Airlines	Kathmandu
Norse Atlantic Airways	Seasonal: London–Gatwick, Manchester, Oslo, Stockholm–Arlanda
Oman Air	Muscat
Peach	Osaka–Kansai
Philippine Airlines	Manila
Qantas	Sydney–Kingsford Smith
Qatar Airways	Doha
Qingdao Airlines	Qingdao
Riyadh Air	Riyadh
Royal Brunei Airlines	Bandar Seri Begawan
Royal Jordanian	Amman–Queen Alia, Kuala Lumpur–International
Ruili Airlines	Lijiang
S7 Airlines	Irkutsk; Seasonal: Novosibirsk, Vladivostok
SalamAir	Muscat
Saudia	Jeddah, Riyadh
Scandinavian Airlines	Seasonal: Copenhagen
SCAT Airlines	Şymkent
Scoot	Singapore
Shandong Airlines	Jinan, Qingdao
Shanghai Airlines	Changchun, Shanghai–Pudong
Shenzhen Airlines	Shenzhen, Yuncheng
Sichuan Airlines	Chengdu–Tianfu, Chongqing
Singapore Airlines	Singapore
Sky Angkor Airlines	Phnom Penh
SpiceJet	Delhi–Indira Gandhi, Kolkata (both begin 1 December 2026)
Spring Airlines	Chengdu–Tianfu, Guangzhou, Jieyang, Lanzhou, Nanning, Ningbo, Shanghai–Pudong, Shijiazhuang, Xi'an, Yangzhou
SriLankan Airlines	Colombo–Bandaranaike
Starlux Airlines	Taipei–Taoyuan
Swiss International Air Lines	Zurich
Thai AirAsia	Buriram, Chiang Mai, Chiang Rai, Hat Yai, Khon Kaen, Krabi, Nakhon Si Thammarat, Narathiwat, Phuket, Surat Thani, Udon Thani
Thai Airways International	Ahmedabad, Amsterdam, Beijing–Capital, Bengaluru, Brussels, Changsha, Chengdu–Tianfu, Chennai, Chiang Mai, Chiang Rai, Colombo–Bandaranaike, Copenhagen, Da Nang (resume 1 December 2026), Delhi–Indira Gandhi, Denpasar, Frankfurt, Fukuoka, Gaya, Guangzhou, Hanoi, Hat Yai, Ho Chi Minh City, Hong Kong, Hyderabad, Istanbul, Jakarta–Soekarno-Hatta, Kaohsiung, Kathmandu, Khon Kaen, Kolkata, Krabi, Kuala Lumpur–International, Kunming, London–Heathrow, Manila, Melbourne, Milan–Malpensa, Mumbai–Shivaji, Munich, Nagoya–Centrair, Osaka–Kansai, Oslo, Paris–Charles de Gaulle, Penang, Perth, Phnom Penh, Phuket, Sapporo–Chitose, Seoul–Incheon, Shanghai–Pudong, Singapore, Stockholm–Arlanda, Sydney–Kingsford Smith, Taipei–Taoyuan, Tokyo–Haneda, Tokyo–Narita, Ubon Ratchathani, Udon Thani, Vientiane, Xiamen, Yangon, Zurich
Thai VietJet Air	Chiang Mai, Chiang Rai, Da Nang, Fukuoka, Hangzhou, Hanoi, Hat Yai, Ho Chi Minh City, Khon Kaen, Kolkata, Krabi, Kuala Lumpur–International, Mumbai–Shivaji, Nakhon Si Thammarat, Osaka–Kansai, Phnom Penh, Phu Quoc, Phuket, Seoul–Incheon, Shanghai–Pudong, Surat Thani, Taipei–Taoyuan, Tokyo–Narita, Ubon Ratchathani, Udon Thani
TransNusa	Jakarta–Soekarno-Hatta
Trinity Airways	Daegu, Seoul–Incheon
Turkish Airlines	Istanbul, Phnom Penh
Turkmenistan Airlines	Ashgabat
United Airlines	Hong Kong, Los Angeles
Urumqi Air	Luoyang
US-Bangla Airlines	Dhaka
Uzbekistan Airways	Tashkent
VietJet Air	Hanoi, Ho Chi Minh City
Vietnam Airlines	Da Nang, Hanoi, Ho Chi Minh City
Vietravel Airlines	Hanoi, Ho Chi Minh City
XiamenAir	Changsha, Xiamen
Zipair Tokyo	Tokyo–Narita

== Passenger traffic and statistics ==
=== Busiest international routes ===
==== Pre-COVID 19 ====
Top 20 busiest international and domestic routes to and from Suvarnabhumi Airport by passenger volume (2019)
Rank	Airport	Passengers handled 2019	% change 2018/19
1	Hong Kong	3,756,449	▼6.57
2	Phuket	3,358,876	▲0.03
3	Singapore	3,258,422	▲3.04
4	Chiang Mai	2,864,525	▼1.61
5	Seoul–Incheon	2,689,306	▲4.93
6	Taipei–Taoyuan	1,928,536	▲3.58
7	Dubai–International	1,707,276	▼11.82
8	Shanghai–Pudong	1,600,930	▲7.18
9	Koh Samui	1,546,570	▼8.22
10	Guangzhou	1,510,461	▲8.96
11	Ho Chi Minh City	1,238,942	▲2.52
12	Tokyo–Haneda	1,230,506	▲9.81
13	Manila	1,179,861	▲17.34
14	Doha	1,166,972	▲13.66
15	New Delhi	1,107,099	▲2.01
16	Tokyo–Narita	1,089,048	▼8.70
17	Kuala Lumpur–International	1,078,045	▼5.26
18	Phnom Penh	976,966	▲26.52
19	Beijing–Capital	956,320	▲0.51
20	Krabi	929,294	▲12.46

==== COVID-19 pandemic ====
Top 20 busiest international routes and domestic routes to and from Suvarnabhumi Airport by passenger volume (2023)
Rank	Airport	Passengers handled 2023	% change 2022/23
1	Phuket	2,916,880	▲19.20
2	Seoul–Incheon	2,891,717	▲129.68
3	Singapore	2,838,693	▲19.20
4	Hong Kong	2,688,822	▲397.64
5	Chiang Mai	2,383,102	▲7.55
6	Taipei–Taoyuan	1,963,084	▲364.57
7	Koh Samui	1,653,028	▲74.31
8	Dubai–International	1,398,078	▲101.68
9	Tokyo–Narita	1,355,815	▲93.79
10	Ho Chi Minh City	1,302,279	▲88.99
11	Doha	1,146,882	▲60.32
12	Phnom Penh	1,096,421	▲56.67
13	Delhi–Indira Gandhi	1,008,263	▲53.75
14	Hanoi	968,508	▲127.38
15	Kuala Lumpur	965,222	▲82.28
16	Tokyo–Haneda	946,969	▲146.47
17	Manila	926,615	▲101.26
18	Krabi	796,900	▲29.64
19	Osaka–Kansai	774,562	▲428.36
20	Hat Yai	755,319	▼24.62

Top 10 busiest international routes to and from Suvarnabhumi Airport by cargo volume (2019)
Rank	Airport	Tons of cargo handled 2019	% change 2018/19
1	Hong Kong	172,977	▼13.50
2	Singapore	99,397	▼9.29
3	Taipei–Taoyuan	92,475	▼11.61
4	Tokyo–Narita	61,431	▼15.68
5	Seoul–Incheon	50,125	▼6.47
6	Doha	46,884	▲7.86
7	Shanghai–Pudong	39,479	▼13.01
8	Tokyo–Haneda	39,042	▼13.80
9	Dubai–International	27,479	▼11.36
10	London–Heathrow	25,450	▼9.44

=== Traffic by calendar year ===
Suvarnabhumi accounted for the largest share of air traffic at Thailand's airports in 2023, handling 51.7 million passengers in 2023, up by 80 percent from the previous year despite its passenger capacity of only 45 million a year.International Passengers handled 2024 more than 700000 people at 21 city and Domestic Passenser handled 2024 more than 6200 people at 16 Airport in 14 Province

Comparison of passenger volume, aircraft movements and cargo volume at Suvarnabhumi Airport, by year
Year	Passengers	Change from previous year	Movements	Cargo (tons)	Notes
2007	41,210,881	–	–	1,220,001	
2008	38,603,490	▼6.3251%	–	1,173,084	
2009	40,500,224	▲4.9133%	–	1,045,194	
2010	42,784,967	▲5.6413%	–	1,310,146	
2011	47,910,744	▲11.9803%	299,566	–	
2012	53,002,328	▲10.6272%	312,493	–	Airports Council International low-cost airlines moved their hubs to DMK in October 2012.
2013	51,363,451	▼3.0921%	288,004	1,236,223	
2014	46,423,352	▼9.6179%	289,568	1,234,176	
2015	52,902,110	▲13.9558%	317,066	1,230,563	
2016	55,892,428	▲5.6530%	336,356	1,306,435	
2017	60,860,704	▲8.8884%	350,508	1,439,913	
2018	63,379,077	▲4.1379%	369,476	1,494,599	
2019	65,425,879	▲3.2294%	380,051	1,324,268	
2020	16,706,235	▼74.4654%	152,614	904,362	
2021	5,663,701	▼66.0983%	111,729	1,120,357	
2022	28,754,350	▲407.6954%	221,331	1,184,157	
2023	51,699,104	▲79.7957%	307,505	1,137,373	
2024	62,234,693	▲16.15%	357,181	1,388,272	
2025	62,902,183	▲1.07%	370,832	1,529,033	

== Traffic and statistics ==
Busiest international routes (2023/2024)
Rank	Airport	Passengers 2023	% change 2023/24	Passengers 2024
1	Changi Airport	2,838,693	▲14.72	3,256,607
2	Hong Kong International Airport	2,688,822	▲17.97	3,171,875
3	Incheon International Airport	2,891,717	▲2.40	2,960,986
4	Taoyuan International Airport	1,963,084	▲27.19	2,496,909
5	Shanghai Pudong International Airport	703,115	▲155.09	1,793,555
6	Dubai International Airport	1,398,078	▲8.12	1,511,622
7	Narita International Airport	1,355,815	▲8.67	1,473,323
8	Guangzhou Baiyun International Airport	454,400	▲203.32	1,378,285
9	Hamad International Airport	1,146,882	▲18.36	1,357,456
10	Tan Son Nhat International Airport	1,302,279	▼5.39	1,232,078
11	Ninoy Aquino International Airport	926,515	▲20.42	1,115,734
12	Phnom Penh International Airport	1,096,421	▼0.86	1,086,986
13	Kuala Lumpur International Airport	965,222	▲12.76	1,078,272
14	Indira Gandhi International Airport	1,008,263	▲6.33	1,072,056
15	Haneda Airport	946,969	▲9.11	1,033,240
16	Noi Bai International Airport	1,302,279	▼26.97	950,942
17	Kansai International Airport	774,562	▲18.47	917,594
18	Yangon International Airport	744,086	▲5.28	783,352
19	Kunming Changshui International Airport	243,370	▲201.63	734,077
20	Chengdu Tianfu International Airport	246,281	▲187.98	709,244
21	Beijing Capital International Airport	372,203	▲88.13	700,234
^{Source: Airport Traffic report 2023}

Busiest domestic routes (2023/2024)
Rank	Airport	Passengers 2023	% change 2023/24	Passengers 2024
1	Phuket International Airport	2,916,880	▲2.04	2,976,664
2	Chiang Mai International Airport	2,383,102	▲2.34	2,438,917
3	Samui International Airport	1,653,028	▲10.05	1,819,304
4	Krabi International Airport	796,900	▼1.39	785,816
5	Hat Yai International Airport	755,319	▼0.18	753,970
6	Chiang Rai International Airport	689,944	▼2.77	670,859
7	Khon Kaen Airport	708,353	▼8.67	655,209
8	Udon Thani International Airport	641,969	▼3.96	616,766
9	Ubon Ratchathani Airport	425,392	▼3.63	440,868
10	Surat Thani International Airport	309,837	▼27.76	223,838
11	Lampang Airport	89,330	▼5.09	84,970
12	Trat Airport	70,180	▲9.02	76,512
13	Sukhothai Airport	64,712	▲2.41	66,276
14	Narathiwat Airport	100,329	▼75.91	24,171
15	Mae Hong Son Airport	4,722	▲109.16	9,877
16	Soneva Kiri Ko Mai Si Airport	8,263	▼24.64	6,227
17	Suvarnabhumi Airport	270	▲735.92	2,257
18	Buriram Airport	1,172	▼32.67	789
19	Nakhon Si Thammarat Airport	64,993	▼99.77	145
20	Hua Hin Airport	26	▲61.54	42
^{Sources:}

== Incidents and accidents ==
- 8 September 2013: Thai Airways International Flight 679, an Airbus A330-300, (HS-TEF, Song Dao), arriving from Guangzhou Baiyun International Airport (CAN) had a runway excursion from runway 19L while landing in heavy rain with extensive damage to the airplane and the runway. The aircraft was evacuated using the emergency slides with only minor injuries among the 288 passengers and 14 crew members. Preliminary investigation determined the cause of the accident to be the right landing gear collapsing as a result of a damaged bogie. In the aftermath of the accident, Thai Airways had the logos of the aircraft painted over in black, prompting widespread criticism of attempted cover-up. An airline official initially said that the practice was part of the "crisis communication rule" recommended by Star Alliance. This was denied by the group, and Thai Airways later clarified that the "de-identifying" of aircraft was its own practice and not Star Alliance policy. The controversy prompted discussion over the appropriateness and effectiveness of the practice as a brand-protection policy. The airframe has since been converted to a roadside attraction called Airways Land, featuring a cafe and event space, on Mittraphap Road in Sida District, Nakhon Ratchasima Province.
- 1 August 2016: Thai Regional Airline Flight 106, a Piper PA-31 Navajo (HS-FGB) arriving from Nakhon Ratchasima Airport with two passengers, crashed at Lam Phak Chi, Nong Chok district, Bangkok. In the incident, there was one fatality (the captain in command) and four injuries.
- 21 May 2024: Singapore Airlines Flight 321, a Boeing 777-300ER (9V-SWM), was en route from London Heathrow to Singapore Changi where the flight encountered severe turbulence over Myaungmya District, Myanmar, resulting in one death and over 100 injuries. The aircraft was diverted.

== Ground transportation ==
=== Rail ===
The Airport Rail Link (ARL) (Thai: รถไฟฟ้าแอร์พอร์ต เรล ลิงก์) is an airport rail link line in Bangkok Metropolitan Region connecting Suvarnabhumi Airport to the city center. The commuter rail line starts at Suvarnabhumi station underneath the airport terminal, before ascending onto an elevated viaduct to Lat Krabang station where it meets the eastern line railway station of the same name. (Each Airport Rail Link station, except Suvarnabhumi and Ratchaprarop stations, is located above an eastern line railway station.) The line continues west, directly running above the eastern line railway for the rest of the line. It runs towards Ban Thap Chang station, then towards Hua Mak station where it meets Yellow Line, then towards Ramkhamhaeng station, then towards Makkasan station where it meets Blue Line, then towards Ratchaprarop station, then towards Phaya Thai station where the line terminates and meets Sukhumvit Line. It is owned by State Railway of Thailand (SRT) and, since 2021, operated by Asia Era One Company Limited. The 28.6-kilometer (17.8 mi)-long Airport Rail Link opened for service on 23 August 2010.

In the future, Airport Rail Link will extend from Phaya Thai towards Krung Thep Aphiwat Central Terminal and Don Mueang International Airport. Its rail will also be used for the proposed Don Mueang–Suvarnabhumi–U-Tapao high-speed railway.

=== Bus ===
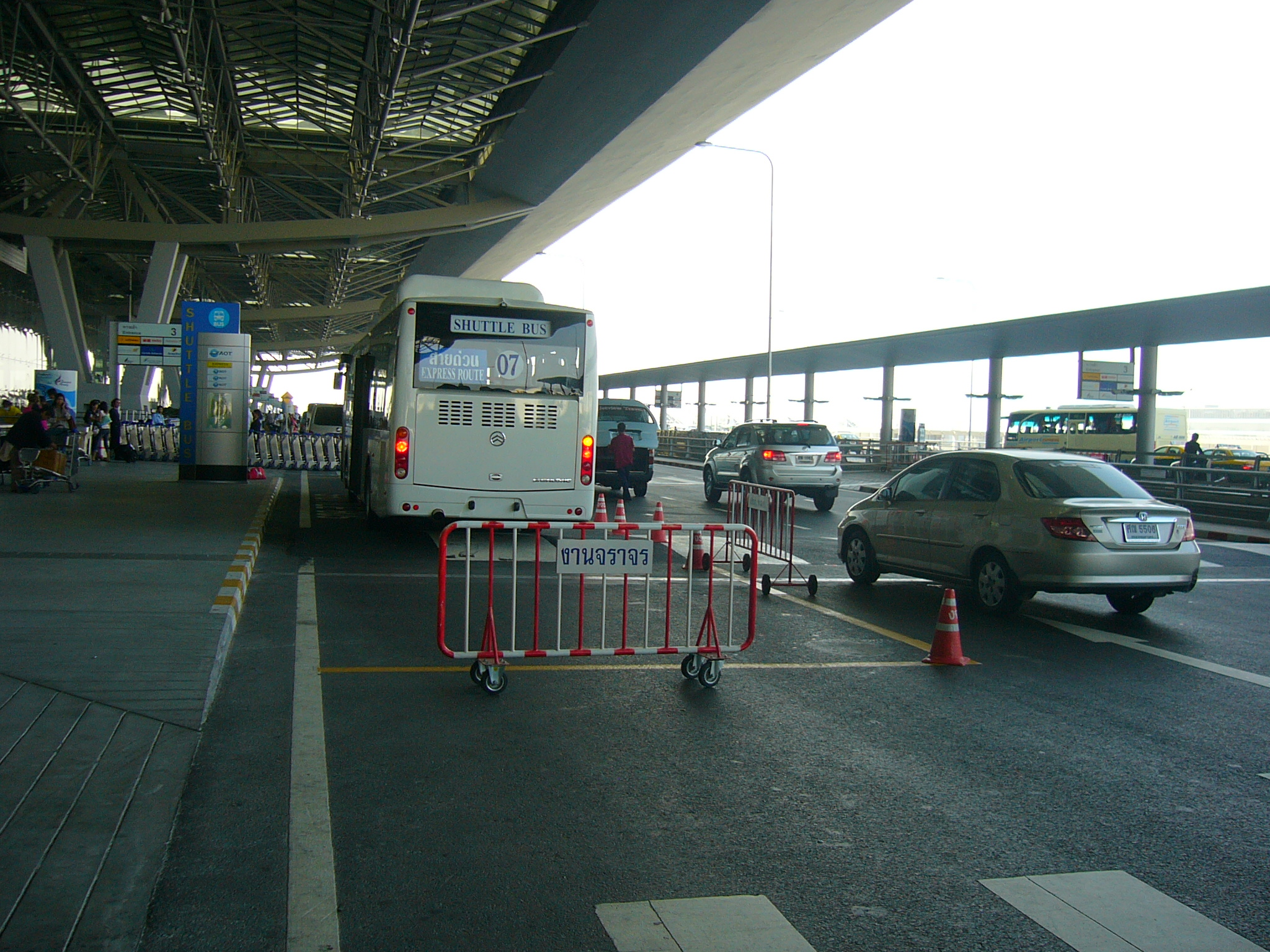
Shuttle bus to Downtown Bangkok

S1 bus route is an air-conditioned bus route operated by Bangkok Mass Transit Authority (BMTA). The route traverse between the airport and Sanam Luang, with stops around Democracy Monument, Lan Luang Road and Wat Ratchanatdaram

== Sky Lane Cycle Track ==
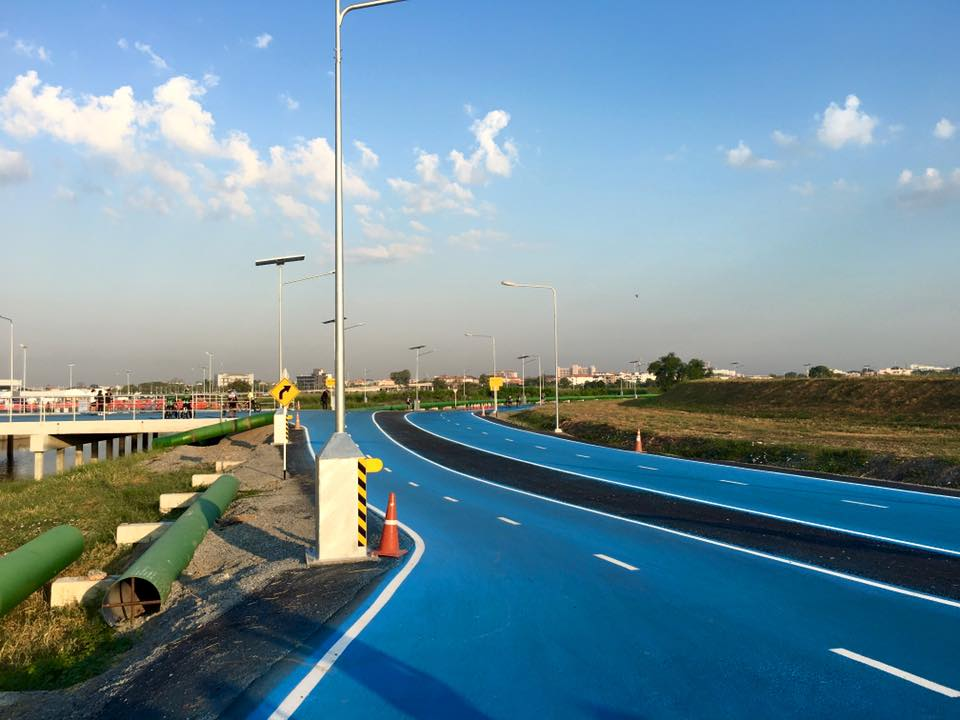
Sky Lane at Suvarnabhumi Airport

In December 2015, Airports of Thailand introduced the Sky Lane (Thai: สกายเลน), a cycling track around the Suvarnabhumi airport perimeter. The entrance to the Sky Lane is located in the northeastern corner of the airport area. Cyclists can bring their bicycles and bike here for free. The Sky Lane is a controlled-access, one-direction, two-lane track built only for cycling, so the riders can be ensured that they will not be bothered by any vehicle. The Sky Lane's length is 23.5 km, making it the longest in Asia. Sky Lane's facilities, which are specially designed for cyclists, include medical facilities, shops, food and beverage, track, parking lot and a rest area. The entrance gate is open from 06:00 to 18:00. On 23 November 2018, King Vajiralongkorn (Rama X) presided over the official opening of the cycling lane at Suvarnabhumi airport and denominated the track as Happy and Healthy Bike Lane (Thai: สนามลู่ปั่นจักรยานเจริญสุขมงคลจิต).
