= Soneva =

Maldives resort chain

- Type: Private
- Industry: Hospitality, tourism, hotel
- Founded: 1995 (31 years ago) in Maldives
- Founder: Sonu Shivdasani; Eva Malmstrom Shivdasani
- Number of locations: 3
- Number of employees: 722 (2016)
- Website: www.soneva.com

Soneva, formerly Soneva Resorts and Residences, is a resort chain founded in Maldives in 1995 by Sonu Shivdasani OBE and his wife Eva Malmström Shivdasani. The Shivdasanis stepped away fully from the business in May 2025, after KSL Capital Partners took a majority interest in Soneva Group.

== History ==
Soneva started as a resort brand under the company Six Senses BVI, founded by Sonu and Eva Shivdasani in 1995.

In 2012, the Shivdasanis sold the Six Senses and Evason branded resort and spa management contracts, and related intellectual property rights, to Pegasus Capital Advisors. The Shivdasanis also sold Soneva Gili (now known as Gili Lankanfushi) and concentrated on resorts with residences, as part of the "One Owner, One Operator, One Philosophy, One Brand" strategy under Soneva. Following the change of Maldivian law in December 2010, Soneva Fushi became one of the first resorts in the Maldives to offer residences to foreigners for purchase under leasehold. A 4-bedroom villa at Soneva Fushi was the first leasehold residential property to be sold in the Maldives in March 2011.

Soneva Fushi is regarded as the first luxury hotel in the Maldives, setting of the trend of luxury holidays in the nation. It was the first "Robinson Crusoe" styled resort in the Maldives and also offered the first wine cellar in the Maldives.

- 1995: Creation of Six Senses BVI and Soneva brand
- 1995: Soneva Fushi opens on the island of Kunfunadhoo, Maldives, with 48 villas
- 2001: Soneva Gili, the first resort in the Maldives to be completely over water, opens
- 2001: First Evason hotel opens in Phuket
- 2004: First Six Senses property opens in Hua Hin
- 2007: Eco Centro opens at Soneva Fushi; the Maldives' first integrated waste management centre
- 2008: Soneva Fushi debuts the first astronomy observatory in the Maldives
- 2008: Soneva introduces 2% carbon levy to offset carbon emissions
- 2008: Soneva bans branded bottled water
- 2009: Soneva Kiri opens in Koh Kood, Thailand
- 2010: Soneva Foundation is founded
- 2011: Sale of private residences at Soneva Fushi begins
- 2012: Split and sale of Six Senses, Evason, and Soneva Gili (now known as Gili Lankanfushi). Soneva is retained by Sonu and Eva Shivdasani as a separate brand under the “one owner, one brand” philosophy.
- 2014: Soneva Fushi opens first Art and Glass studio in the Maldives
- 2015: Soneva in Aqua sets sail
- October 2016: Soneva Jani opens with residences available for purchase The resort currently feature 24 over water villas and two on land - expansions plans are currently underway to build more beach villas.
- December 2020: Soneva Jani Chapter 2 opens, including 28 overwater retreats - with the new accommodation came the launch of Soneva's first all-inclusive product which includes all food and experiences.
- April 2023: Soneva Fushi launches conservation, education and science facility AquaTerra.
- February 2025: installation of renewable energy systems at Soneva Jani and Soneva Fushi, supplying 50% of the resorts’ electricity needs in order to reduce diesel consumption by 2,000,000 liters and carbon emissions by 5,000 tons per annum.
- May 2025: KSL Capital Partners takes a majority stake in Soneva, with Sonu Shivdasani and Eva Malmstrom Shivdasani stepping back from all involvement with the business.

== Lawsuits & Allegations ==
=== Lawsuit regarding the crash of Thai Flying Service Flight 209 to Soneva Kiri Resort ===
On August 22, 2024, the Thai Flying Service Flight 209 crashed soon after taking off from Bangkok. The flight was a domestic Thai passenger charter flight operated by Thai Flying Service on behalf of the Soneva Kiri resort from Bangkok's Suvarnabhumi Airport to the resort's private airstrip on Ko Mai Si in Ko Kut district. All nine occupants on the plane were killed, including two Thai pilots and seven passengers: two Thai resort employees and five Chinese nationals, including two children.

The flight was offered by Soneva Kiri to the five Chinese nationals as part of the tour package. Soneva confirmed in the booking email that they will arrange the flight from Bangkok to the resort. Two employees of Soneva Kiri were among the seven passengers on the plane, accompanying the Chinese guests to the resort. However, Soneva denied their responsibility in the air crash and refused to provide any compensation to the Chinese guests on the plane. The family of Chinese victims have got no payment from insurance either, as there were no insurance policies for individual passengers.

The family members of five Chinese victims sued Soneva Kiri and Thai Flying Services in August 2025, after a lengthy and meaningless interaction with Soneva and Thai Flying Services. The lawsuit could take years to resolve.

Soneva Kiri Resort changed its ownership in May 2025. However, other resorts under Soneva remain in operation.

=== Collaboration with the now jailed Maldives ex-Tourism Minister Ahmed Adeeb ===
In 2018 Sonashah Shivdasani and his Soneva Jani Resort in the Maldives were highlighted in an OCCRP (Organized Crime and Corruption Reporting Project) report as partners to the former Minister of Tourism in the Maldives, Ahmed Adeeb, who is currently imprisoned for corruption. Soneva is a privately held company of Sonu and Eva Shivdasani. Records show that the Shivdasanis obtained the Maldives island of Medhufaru and its surroundings, now the location of their Soneva Jani resort, via a no-bid contract in 2014. The Shivdasanis were among one of many companies that unlawfully benefited from Adeeb's activities, all which were headed by politically connected members of the elite. Ahmed Adeeb, the now imprisoned former tourism minister of the Maldives, leased out over 50 islands and lagoons for tourism development without the public tenders the law of the Maldives requires. Tens of millions of dollars' worth of these lease fees were then embezzled by Adeeb and his accomplices.

=== Lawsuit regarding fire at the Soneva Kiri Resort due to inadequate fire safety ===
The Soneva Kiri Resort, a privately held company of Sonu and his wife Eva Shivdasani, was not constructed in line with the legal safety standards required, and has been under investigation by the Department of Special Investigation by the Natural Resources and Environment Division in Thailand. The consequences of the resort's inadequate safety standards were made manifest in March 2022. A massive fire broke out at the Soneva Kiri Resort on Koh Kut island and gutted one of the site's villas. Charges have been brought against three executives of the resort, including Sonashah Shivdasani. The claims include causing a fire by negligence, causing damages to people's property, endangering other persons, and allowing others to use the building for hotel business without obtaining a license from local authorities. In a press article (The Nation, 2 July 2022), RTP's Assistant Commissioner General Sompong Chingduang was quoted as saying: “Investigation revealed that the resort’s Villa 63, where the fire started, had never been inspected for fire safety and that the company had been renting it out to guests without notifying the registrar as required by the Hotel Act of 2004.” . According to press reports Sonu Shivadsani is a fugitive and has refused to appear to face charges.

=== Scandal alleging that Sonu Shivdasani ran a scheme to fraudulently induce victims to purchase properties at the Soneva Kiri Resort ===
In March 2021, a case (KSL Capital Partners, case number 1:21-mc-00064, in the U.S. District Court for the District of Colorado) was brought by a Swiss businessman who petitioned under Section 1782 of the U.S. Code — which allows federal courts to order entities in their districts to turn over evidence to be used in certain foreign proceedings - for the court to obtain information from a private equity firm in order to pursue foreign proceedings against Sonu Shivdasani his company Bluebay Resorts (BVI) Ltd.

The Swiss businessman Jean Sebastian Ferrer Funke and his company Ecoprivate Business Ltd. alleged that Sonu Shivdasani deceived them into investing in a $6.2 million villa in Thailand and thus filed an ex parte petition for a federal court order to obtain evidence from KSL Capital Partners, a Denver-based private equity firm specializing in travel and leisure enterprises, which participated in a $230 million investment in Sonashah Shivdasani's Soneva Kiri Resort. Ferrer petitioned for an order under Section 1782 of the U.S. Code — which allows federal courts to order entities in their districts to turn over evidence to be used in certain foreign proceedings — directing KSL Capital Partners to produce documents as the applicants pursue litigation and arbitration against Shivdasani and his company Bluebay Resorts (BVI) Ltd. According to the petition, Ferrer is one of several victims of the alleged Soneva Kiri Resort scheme.

Shivdasani is accused of running a scheme that used Bluebay as a vehicle to fraudulently induce Ferrer and Ecoprivate to purchase a Thai villa and surrounding land at the Soneva Kiri Resort for $6.2 million. However, Shivdasani failed to deliver the property to them, resulting in Ferrer and Ecoprivate requesting access to KSL's documents for use in a contemplated criminal complaint against Shivdasani in Switzerland for fraud and criminal mismanagement, and for Ecoprivate to commence an arbitration proceeding against Bluebay. In a subsequent U.S. discovery action, on 28 July 2023, Ecoprivate Business Ltd. and Jean Sebastian Ferrer Funke (‘Applicants’) were again granted their application in obtaining an order, under 28 U.S.C. § 1782, to serve subpoenas on The Clearing House Payments Company L.L.C., the Federal Reserve Bank of New York, Barclays Bank PLC, and HSBC Bank USA, N.A. The Applicants contended that the records they seek are relevant to two foreign proceedings: a contemplated criminal proceeding in Switzerland and a contemplated action to enforce an arbitral award in the United Kingdom.

== Locations ==
Soneva owns and manages Soneva Fushi (Baa Atoll), Soneva Jani (Noonu Atoll) and Soneva Secret (Makunudhoo Atoll) in the Maldives.

Soneva also owns and manages a two bedroom luxury yacht, the Soneva in Aqua.

== Sustainability ==
Soneva has been described as one of the world's most sustainable resort brands and has implemented various sustainability policies since its inception.

- 1995: commits to using only recycled and sustainable materials in the construction of the flagship resort Soneva Fushi.
- 1998: banned single use plastic straws on its islands.
- 2008: Soneva introduces 2% carbon levy to offset carbon emissions.
- 2008: Soneva bans branded bottled water.
- 2009: Eco Centro opens at Soneva Fushi; the Maldives' first integrated waste management centre.
- 2013: Soneva Fushi launches conservation, education and science facility AquaTerra.
- 2014: Soneva Fushi opens first Art and Glass studio in the Maldives. The studio only using waste glass from Soneva resorts and other resorts in the Maldives.
- 2025: installation of renewable energy systems at Soneva Jani and Soneva Fushi, supplying 50% of the resorts’ electricity needs in order to reduce diesel consumption by 2,000,000 liters and carbon emissions by 5,000 tons per annum.

== The Soneva Foundation ==
The Soneva Foundation is a UK registered charity (number 113811) founded in 2010. It is funded by Soneva's 2% carbon levy on room revenue and profits from the sale of water bottled on the property.

One project is focused on the restoration of forests in northern Thailand, in Chiang Mai where 452,000 trees were planted. A Framework Species Methodology was used, and 90 different species of trees were planted with guidance from the Forest Restoration Research Unit at Chiang Mai University. Three main sites were restored: at Si Lanna National Park, The Royal Project at Nong Hoi, and the Pai River Watershed Wildlife Sanctuary.

The Soneva Foundation has also implemented 488 projects in 53 countries to improve access to safe drinking water or basic sanitation. These projects turned into the WHOLE WORLD Water (WWW) campaign, which was co-founded by the foundation, together with Karena Albers and Jenifer Willig in 2013. Hotels and restaurants who join the campaign filter and bottle their own drinking water in reusable glass bottles, and donate 10 percent of the profits in sales to the WWW fund. In many places including the Maldives, this process saves the property money as they cut down on costs associated with the transportation and disposal of imported plastic-bottled water. Several properties have joined the campaign, including Fairmont Hotels, several Ritz-Carlton properties, Virgin Limited Edition hotels, Raffles Hotels and Auberge du Soleil

The Soneva Foundation also holds the annual SLOW LIFE Symposium, from which WHOLE WORLD Water was formed. Business leaders, scientists, NGOs, renowned thinkers and policy makers convene with the goal of implementing positive change in the world that is also good for business.
