= List of AirAsia Group destinations =

This is a list of current and confirmed prospective destinations that AirAsia and its subsidiaries Indonesia AirAsia, Thai AirAsia, Philippines AirAsia, AirAsia Cambodia, AirAsia X and Thai AirAsia X are flying to.

== Destinations ==
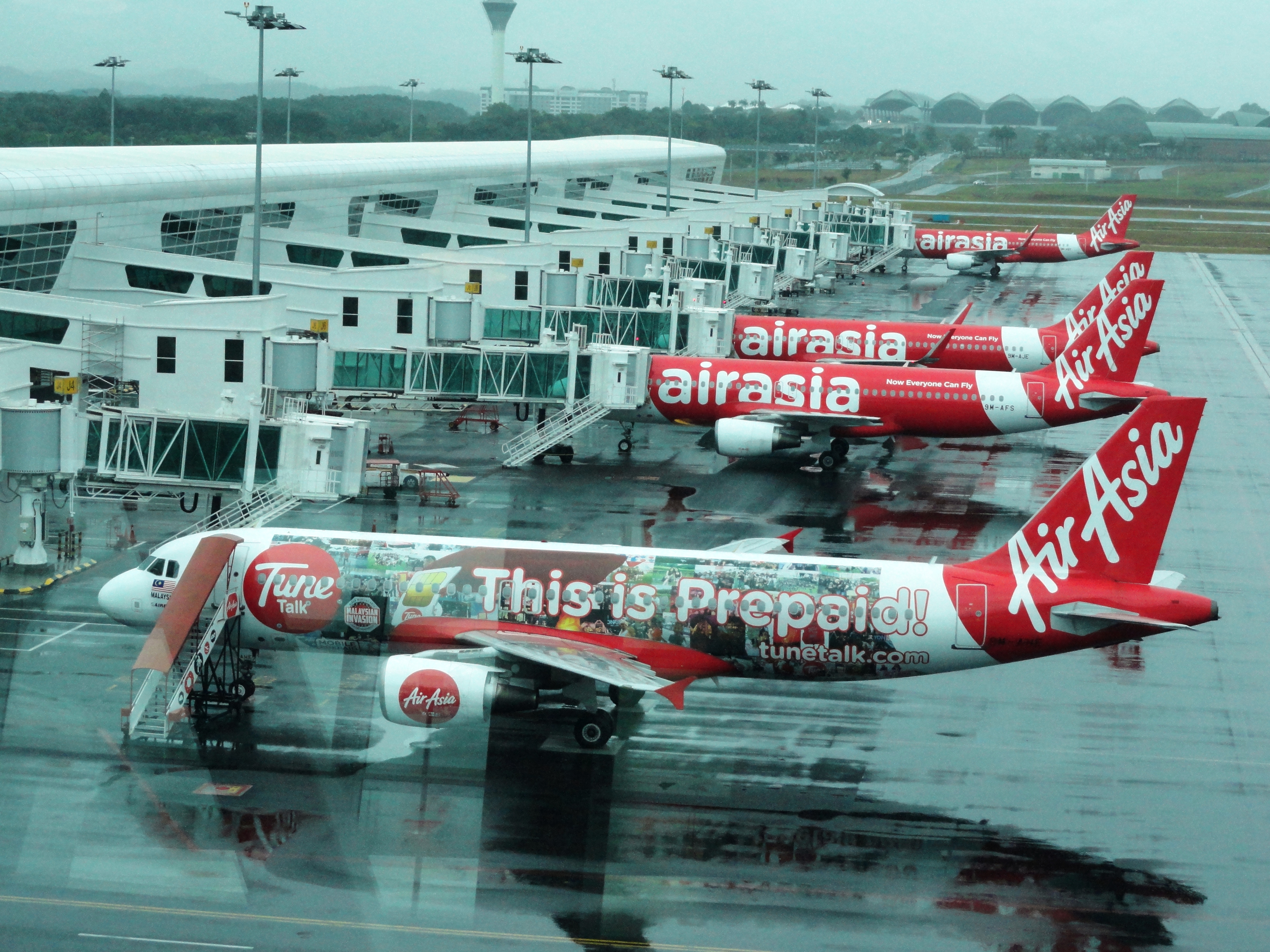
Kuala Lumpur International Airport, the airline's largest hub

IATA	Airline
AK	AirAsia
D7	AirAsia X
FD	Thai AirAsia
QZ	Indonesia AirAsia
Z2	Philippines AirAsia
XJ	Thai AirAsia X
KT	AirAsia Cambodia
DJ	AirAsia Japan (defunct)
XT	Indonesia AirAsia X (defunct)

Hubs
Charter routes
Seasonal routes
Future routes
Terminated routes

City	Country/Region	IATA	ICAO	Airport	AK	D7	FD	QZ	Z2	DJ	XJ	XY	KT	Refs
Abu Dhabi	United Arab Emirates	AUH	OMAA	Abu Dhabi International Airport										
Adelaide	Australia	ADL	YPAD	Adelaide Airport		✓		Yes						
Ahmedabad	India	AMD	VAAH	Sardar Vallabhbhai Patel International Airport	Yes		Yes							
Almaty	Kazakhstan	ALA	UAAA	Almaty International Airport		Yes					Yes			
Alor Setar	Malaysia	AOR	WMKA	Sultan Abdul Halim Airport	Yes									
Amritsar	India	ATQ	VIAR	Sri Guru Ram Dass Jee International Airport	Yes									
Auckland	New Zealand	AKL	NZAA	Auckland Airport										
Bacolod	Philippines	BCD	RPVB	Bacolod–Silay Airport					Yes					
Bahrain	Bahrain	BAH	OBBI	Bahrain International Airport		Yes								
Balikpapan	Indonesia	BPN	WALL	Sultan Aji Muhammad Sulaiman International Airport	Yes			Yes						
Banda Aceh	Indonesia	BTJ	WITT	Sultan Iskandar Muda International Airport	Yes									
Bandar Seri Begawan	Brunei	BWN	WBSB	Brunei International Airport	Yes			Yes						
Bandung	Indonesia	BDO	WICC	Husein Sastranegara Airport										
Bangkok	Thailand	DMK	VTBD	Don Mueang International Airport	Yes		Yes	Yes	Yes		Yes			
Bangkok	Thailand	BKK	VTBS	Suvarnabhumi Airport			Yes							
Banjarmasin	Indonesia	BDJ	WAOO	Syamsudin Noor International Airport	✓									
Batam	Indonesia	BTH	WIDD	Hang Nadim International Airport	Yes									
Beijing	China	PEK	ZBAA	Beijing Capital International Airport										
Beijing	China	PKX	ZBAD	Beijing Daxing International Airport	Yes	Yes	Yes							
Bengaluru	India	BLR	VOBL	Kempegowda International Airport	Yes		Yes							
Berau	Indonesia	BEJ	WAQT	Kalimarau Airport				Yes						
Bhubaneswar	India	BBI	VEBS	Biju Patnaik International Airport										
Bintulu	Malaysia	BTU	WBGB	Bintulu Airport	Yes									
Brisbane	Australia	BNE	YBBN	Brisbane Airport										
Buriram	Thailand	BFV	VTUO	Buriram Airport			Yes							
Busan	South Korea	PUS	RKPK	Gimhae International Airport		Yes								
Cagayan de Oro	Philippines	CGY	RPMY	Laguindingan International Airport					Yes					
Cairns	Australia	CNS	YBCS	Cairns International Airport										
Can Tho	Vietnam	VCA	VVCT	Can Tho Airport										
Caticlan	Philippines	MPH	RPVE	Godofredo P. Ramos Airport					Yes					
Cebu	Philippines	CEB	RPVM	Mactan–Cebu International Airport					Yes					
Changsha	China	CSX	ZGHA	Changsha Huanghua International Airport		Yes	Yes							
Chengdu	China	CTU	ZUUU	Chengdu Shuangliu International Airport										
Chengdu	China	TFU	ZUTF	Chengdu Tianfu International Airport		Yes								
Chennai	India	MAA	VOMM	Chennai International Airport	Yes		Yes							
Chiang Mai	Thailand	CNX	VTCC	Chiang Mai International Airport	Yes		Yes							
Chiang Rai	Thailand	CEI	VTCT	Chiang Rai International Airport	Yes		Yes							
Chongqing	China	CKG	ZUCK	Chongqing Jiangbei International Airport		Yes	Yes							
Chumphon	Thailand	CJM	VTSE	Chumphon Airport			Yes							
Christchurch	New Zealand	CHC	NZCH	Christchurch Airport										
Clark	Philippines	CRK	RPLC	Clark International Airport					Yes					
Colombo	Sri Lanka	CMB	VCBI	Bandaranaike International Airport	Yes		Yes							
Da Lat	Vietnam	DLI	VVDL	Lien Khuong Airport	Yes									
Da Nang	Vietnam	DAD	VVDN	Da Nang International Airport	Yes		Yes	Yes	Yes					
Darwin	Australia	DRW	YPDN	Darwin International Airport										
Davao	Philippines	DVO	RPMD	Francisco Bangoy International Airport					Yes					
Delhi	India	DEL	VIDP	Indira Gandhi International Airport		Yes					Yes			
Denpasar	Indonesia	DPS	WADD	Ngurah Rai International Airport	Yes	Yes	Yes	Yes						
Dhaka	Bangladesh	DAC	VGHS	Shahjalal International Airport	Yes		Yes							
Dumaguete	Philippines	DGT	RPVD	Sibulan Airport										
Fukuoka	Japan	FUK	RJFF	Fukuoka Airport	Yes		Yes							
Gaya	India	GAY	VEGY	Gaya Airport										
General Santos	Philippines	GES	RPMR	General Santos International Airport										
Goa	India	GOI	VOGO	Goa International Airport	✓									
Gold Coast	Australia	OOL	YBCG	Gold Coast Airport										
Guwahati	India	GAU	VEGT	Lokpriya Gopinath Bordoloi International Airport	Yes		Yes							
Guangzhou	China	CAN	ZGGG	Guangzhou Baiyun International Airport	Yes		Yes		✓					
Guilin	China	KWL	ZGKL	Guilin Liangjiang International Airport	Yes									
Guiyang	China	KWE	ZUGY	Guiyang Longdongbao International Airport										
Haikou	China	HAK	ZJHK	Haikou Meilan International Airport										
Hangzhou	China	HGH	ZSHC	Hangzhou Xiaoshan International Airport	Yes	Yes	Yes							
Hanoi	Vietnam	HAN	VVNB	Noi Bai International Airport	Yes		Yes		Yes					
Hat Yai	Thailand	HDY	VTSS	Hat Yai International Airport			Yes							
Ho Chi Minh City	Vietnam	SGN	VVTS	Tan Son Nhat International Airport	Yes		Yes							
Hong Kong	Hong Kong SAR, China	HKG	VHHH	Hong Kong International Airport	Yes	Yes	Yes		Yes					
Honolulu	United States	HNL	PHNL	Honolulu International Airport										
Hua Hin	Thailand	HHQ	VTPH	Hua Hin Airport			Yes							
Hyderabad	India	HYD	VOHS	Rajiv Gandhi International Airport	Yes									
Iloilo	Philippines	ILO	RPVI	Iloilo International Airport					Yes					
Ipoh	Malaysia	IPH	WMKI	Sultan Azlan Shah Airport	Yes									
Istanbul	Turkey	SAW	LTFJ	Sabiha Gökçen International Airport		Yes								
Jaipur	India	JAI	VIJP	Jaipur Airport			Yes							
Jakarta	Indonesia	CGK	WIII	Soekarno–Hatta International Airport	Yes			Yes						
Jeddah	Saudi Arabia	JED	OEJN	King Abdulaziz International Airport		Yes								
Jeju	South Korea	CJU	RKPC	Jeju International Airport										
Johor Bahru	Malaysia	JHB	WMKJ	Senai International Airport	Yes		Yes	Yes						
Kalibo	Philippines	KLO	RPVK	Kalibo International Airport					Yes					
Kaohsiung	Taiwan	KHH	RCKH	Kaohsiung International Airport	Yes		Yes		Yes					
Karachi	Pakistan	KHI	OPKC	Jinnah International Airport		✓								
Kathmandu	Nepal	KTM	VNKT	Tribhuvan International Airport										
Khon Kaen	Thailand	KKC	VTUK	Khon Kaen Airport			Yes							
Kochi	India	COK	VOCI	Cochin International Airport	Yes		Yes							
Kolkata	India	CCU	VECC	Netaji Subhash Chandra Bose International Airport	Yes		Yes							
Kota Bharu	Malaysia	KBR	WMKC	Sultan Ismail Petra Airport	Yes									
Kota Kinabalu	Malaysia	BKI	WBKK	Kota Kinabalu International Airport	Yes			Yes	Yes					
Kozhikode	India	CCJ	VOCL	Kozhikode International Airport	Yes									
Krabi	Thailand	KBV	VTSG	Krabi International Airport	Yes		Yes							
Kuala Lumpur	Malaysia	KUL	WMKK	Kuala Lumpur International Airport	Yes	Yes	Yes	Yes	Yes					
Kuala Lumpur	Malaysia	SZB	WMSA	Sultan Abdul Aziz Shah Airport	✓									
Kuala Terengganu	Malaysia	TGG	WMKN	Sultan Mahmud Airport	Yes									
Kuantan	Malaysia	KUA	WMKD	Sultan Haji Ahmad Shah Airport										
Kuching	Malaysia	KCH	WBGG	Kuching International Airport	Yes			Yes						
Kunming	China	KMG	ZPPP	Kunming Changshui International Airport	Yes		Yes							
Labuan	Malaysia	LBU	WBKL	Labuan Airport	Yes									
Labuan Bajo	Indonesia	LBJ	WATO	Komodo International Airport	Yes			Yes						
Langkawi	Malaysia	LGK	WMKL	Langkawi International Airport	Yes									
Loei	Thailand	LOE	VTUL	Loei Airport			Yes							
Lanzhou	China	LHW	ZLLL	Lanzhou Zhongchuan International Airport										
Lombok	Indonesia	LOP	WADL	Lombok International Airport	Yes									
London	United Kingdom	STN	EGSS	London Stansted Airport										
London	United Kingdom	LGW	EGKK	London Gatwick Airport		Yes								
Luang Prabang	Laos	LPQ	VLLB	Luang Prabang International Airport			Yes							
Lucknow	India	LKO	VILK	Chaudhary Charan Singh Airport	Yes		Yes							
Macau	Macau SAR, China	MFM	VMMC	Macau International Airport	Yes		Yes		Yes					
Majalengka	Indonesia	KJT	WICA	Kertajati International Airport	Yes			Yes						
Makassar	Indonesia	UPG	WAAA	Sultan Hasanuddin International Airport	Yes									
Malé	Maldives	MLE	VRMM	Velana International Airport	Yes		Yes							
Manado	Indonesia	MDC	WAMM	Sam Ratulangi International Airport	Yes									
Mandalay	Myanmar	MDL	VYMD	Mandalay International Airport										
Manila	Philippines	MNL	RPLL	Ninoy Aquino International Airport	Yes				Yes					
Mauritius	Mauritius	MRU	FIMP	Sir Seewoosagur Ramgoolam International Airport										
Medan	Indonesia	KNO	WIMM	Kualanamu International Airport	Yes			Yes						
Medina	Saudi Arabia	MED	OEMA	Prince Mohammad bin Abdulaziz International Airport		Yes								
Meixian	China	MXZ	ZGMX	Meixian Airport										
Melaka	Malaysia	MKZ	WMKM	Malacca International Airport										
Melbourne/Geelong	Australia	AVV	YMAV	Avalon Airport										
Melbourne	Australia	MEL	YMML	Melbourne Airport		Yes		Yes						
Miri	Malaysia	MYY	WBGR	Miri Airport	Yes									
Mumbai	India	BOM	VABB	Chhatrapati Shivaji Maharaj International Airport										
Muscat	Oman	MCT	OOMS	Muscat International Airport										
Nagoya	Japan	NGO	RJGG	Chubu Centrair International Airport							Yes			
Nairobi	Kenya	NBO	HKJK	Jomo Kenyatta International Airport		Yes								
Nakhon Si Thammarat	Thailand	NST	VTSF	Nakhon Si Thammarat Airport			Yes							
Nakhon Phanom	Thailand	KOP	VTUW	Nakhon Phanom Airport			Yes							
Nan	Thailand	NNT	VTCN	Nan Airport			Yes							
Nanchang	China	KHN	ZSCN	Nanchang Changbei International Airport										
Nanjing	China	KHN	ZSNJ	Nanjing Lukou International Airport										
Nanning	China	NNG	ZGNN	Nanning Wuxu International Airport	Yes									
Narathiwat	Thailand	NAW	VTSC	Narathiwat Airport			Yes							
Naypyidaw	Myanmar	NYT	VYNT	Naypyidaw International Airport										
Nha Trang	Vietnam	CXR	VVCR	Cam Ranh International Airport	Yes		Yes							
Ningbo	China	NGB	ZSNB	Ningbo Lishe International Airport	Yes									
Okinawa	Japan	OKA	ROAH	Naha Airport			Yes							
Osaka	Japan	KIX	RJBB	Kansai International Airport		Yes			Yes		Yes			
Padang	Indonesia	PDG	WIPT	Minangkabau International Airport	Yes									
Palembang	Indonesia	PLM	WIPP	Sultan Mahmud Badaruddin II International Airport	Yes									
Paris	France	ORY	LFPO	Orly Airport										
Pattaya	Thailand	UTP	VTBU	U-Tapao International Airport	Yes		✓							
Pekanbaru	Indonesia	PKU	WIBB	Sultan Syarif Kasim II International Airport	Yes									
Penang	Malaysia	PEN	WMKP	Penang International Airport	Yes		Yes	Yes						
Perth	Australia	PER	YPPH	Perth Airport	Yes	✓		Yes						
Phnom Penh	Cambodia	PNH	VDPP	Phnom Penh International Airport										
Phnom Penh	Cambodia	KTI	VDTI	Techo International Airport	Yes		Yes	Yes					Yes	
Phuket	Thailand	HKT	VTSP	Phuket International Airport	Yes		Yes							
Phitsanulok	Thailand	PHS	VTPP	Phitsanulok Airport			Yes							
Phu Quoc	Vietnam	PQC	VVPQ	Phu Quoc International Airport	Yes								Yes	
Pontianak	Indonesia	PNK	WIOO	Supadio International Airport	Yes									
Port Blair	India	IXZ	VOPB	Veer Savarkar International Airport										
Puerto Princesa	Philippines	PPS	RPVP	Puerto Princesa International Airport					Yes					
Quanzhou	China	JJN	ZSQZ	Quanzhou Jinjiang Airport	Yes									
Ranong	Thailand	UNN	VTSR	Ranong Airport			Yes							
Riyadh	Saudi Arabia	RUH	OERK	King Khalid International Airport							Yes			
Roi Et	Thailand	ROI	VTUV	Roi Et Airport			Yes							
Roxas City	Philippines	RXS	RPVR	Roxas Airport					Yes					
Sakon Nakhon	Thailand	SNO	VTUI	Sakon Nakhon Airport			Yes							
Sandakan	Malaysia	SDK	WBKS	Sandakan Airport	Yes									
Sapporo	Japan	CTS	RJCC	New Chitose Airport		Yes					Yes			
Sanya	China	SYX	ZJSY	Sanya Phoenix International Airport			Yes							
Semarang	Indonesia	SRG	WARS	Jenderal Ahmad Yani International Airport										
Sendai	Japan	SDJ	RJSS	Sendai Airport							Yes			
Seoul	South Korea	ICN	RKSI	Incheon International Airport	Yes	Yes	Yes		Yes		Yes			
Shanghai	China	PVG	ZSPD	Shanghai Pudong International Airport	Yes	Yes			✓		Yes			
Shantou	China	SWA	ZGOW	Jieyang Chaoshan International Airport	Yes		Yes							
Shenzhen	China	SZX	ZGSZ	Shenzhen Bao'an International Airport	Yes		Yes		✓					
Shenyang	China	SHE	ZYTX	Shenyang Taoxian International Airport							Yes			
Siborong-Borong	Indonesia	DTB	WIMN	Silangit International Airport				Yes						
Sibu	Malaysia	SBW	WBGS	Sibu Airport	Yes									
Siem Reap	Cambodia	REP	VDSR	Siem Reap International Airport										
Siem Reap	Cambodia	SAI	VDSA	Siem Reap–Angkor International Airport	Yes		Yes						Yes	
Sihanoukville	Cambodia	KOS	VDSV	Sihanoukville International Airport	Yes								Yes	
Singapore	Singapore	SIN	WSSS	Singapore Changi Airport	Yes		Yes	Yes						
Solo	Indonesia	SOC	WARQ	Adisoemarmo International Airport										
Sorong	Indonesia	SOQ	WASS	Domine Eduard Osok Airport				Yes						
Surabaya	Indonesia	SUB	WARR	Juanda International Airport				Yes						
Surat Thani	Thailand	URT	VTSB	Surat Thani Airport			Yes							
Sydney	Australia	SYD	YSSY	Sydney Airport		Yes					Yes			
Tacloban	Philippines	TAC	RPVA	Daniel Z. Romualdez Airport					Yes					
Tagbilaran	Philippines	TAG	RPVT	Tagbilaran Airport										
Tagbilaran	Philippines	TAG	RPSP	Bohol–Panglao International Airport					Yes					
Taipei	Taiwan	TPE	RCTP	Taoyuan International Airport	Yes	Yes	Yes		Yes					
Tanjung Pandan	Indonesia	TJQ	WIKT	H.A.S. Hanandjoeddin International Airport				Yes						
Tarakan	Indonesia	TRK	WAQQ	Juwata Airport				Yes						
Tashkent	Uzbekistan	TAS	UTTT	Islam Karimov Tashkent International Airport		Yes								
Tawau	Malaysia	TWU	WBKW	Tawau Airport	Yes									
Tbilisi	Georgia	TBS	UGTB	Tbilisi International Airport							Yes			
Tehran	Iran	IKA	OIIE	Tehran Imam Khomeini International Airport										
Thiruvananthapuram	India	TRV	VOTV	Trivandrum International Airport	Yes									
Tianjin	China	TSN	ZBTJ	Tianjin Binhai International Airport		Yes					Yes			
Tiruchirapalli	India	TRZ	VOTR	Tiruchirapalli Airport	Yes									
Tokyo	Japan	HND	RJTT	Haneda Airport		Yes								
Tokyo	Japan	NRT	RJAA	Narita International Airport			Yes		Yes		Yes			
Trang	Thailand	TST	VTST	Trang Airport			Yes							
Ubon Ratchathani	Thailand	UBP	VTUU	Ubon Ratchathani Airport			Yes							
Udon Thani	Thailand	UTH	VTUD	Udon Thani Airport			Yes							
Varanasi	India	VNS	VEBN	Lal Bahadur Shastri Airport			Yes							
Vientiane	Laos	VTE	VLVT	Wattay International Airport	Yes		Yes							
Visakhapatnam	India	VTZ	VOVZ	Visakhapatnam Airport										
Xiamen	China	XMN	ZSAM	Xiamen Gaoqi International Airport										
Wenzhou	China	WNZ	ZSWZ	Wenzhou Longwan International Airport										
Wuhan	China	WUH	ZHHH	Wuhan Tianhe International Airport	Yes									
Xi'an	China	XIY	ZLXY	Xi'an Xianyang International Airport		Yes	Yes							
Yangon	Myanmar	RGN	VYYY	Yangon International Airport	Yes		Yes							
Yogyakarta	Indonesia	YIA	WAHI	Yogyakarta International Airport	Yes			Yes						
Zamboanga	Philippines	ZAM	RPMZ	Zamboanga International Airport										
