= Indonesia AirAsia =

Low-cost airline of Indonesia

PT Indonesia AirAsia

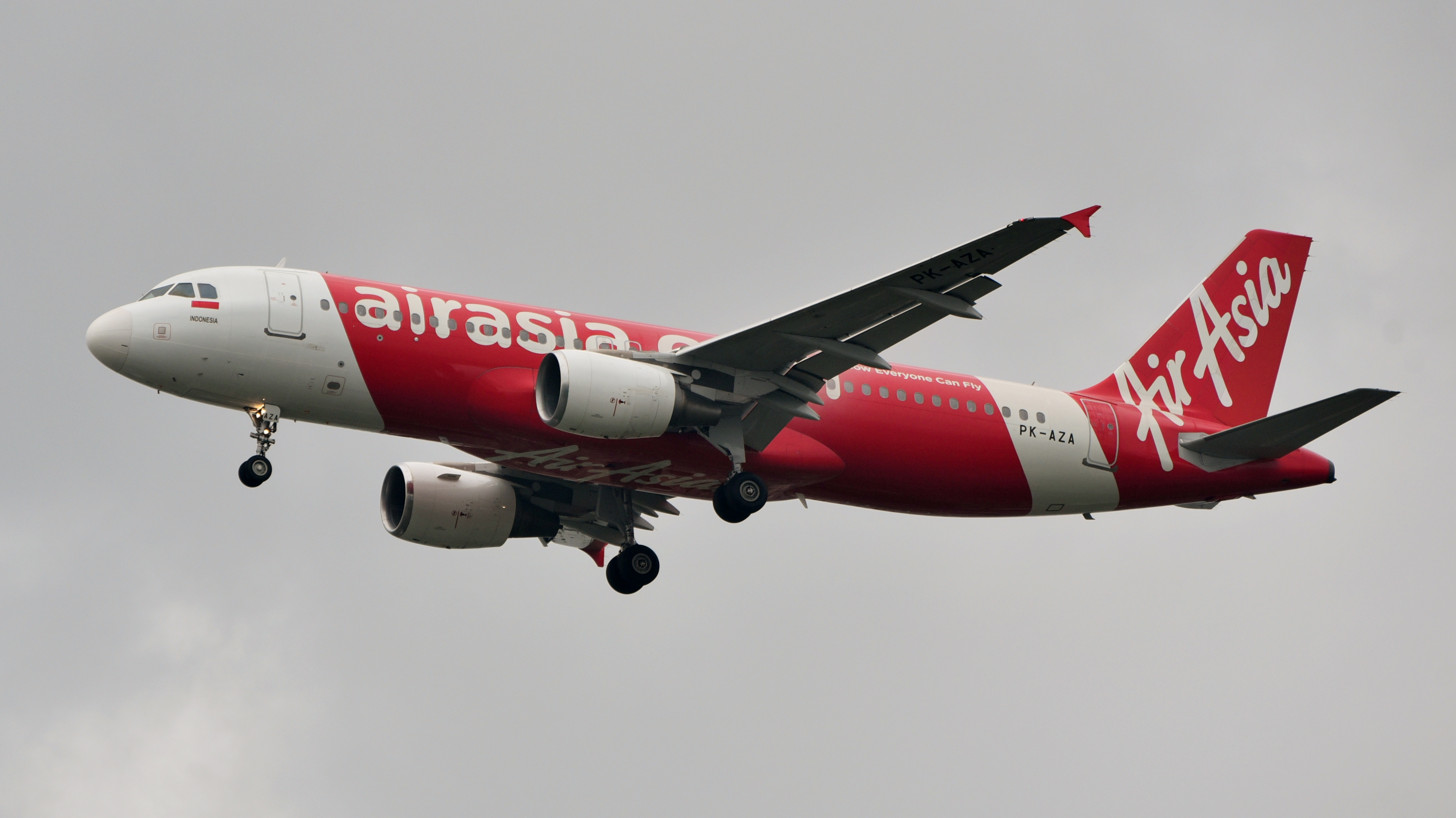
- Indonesia Airasia Airbus A320
IATA	ICAO	Call sign
QZ	AWQ	WAGON AIR
- Founded: 1999; 27 years ago (as Awair)
- Commenced operations: 22 June 2000; 26 years ago (as Awair); 1 December 2005; 20 years ago (as Indonesia AirAsia)
- Operating bases: Denpasar; Medan; Jakarta–Soekarno-Hatta; Surabaya
- Frequent-flyer program: BIG Loyalty Programme
- Fleet size: 27
- Destinations: 33
- Parent company: PT AirAsia Indonesia Tbk.
- Headquarters: Tangerang, Banten, Indonesia
- Key people: Cpt. Achmad Sadikin Abdurachman (CEO)
- Employees: 1,715
- Website: www.airasia.com

Indonesia AirAsia is an Indonesian low-cost airline based in Tangerang, Banten in Jakarta, nearby its main operating base at Soekarno–Hatta International Airport. It operates scheduled domestic and international services, being an Indonesian subsidiary of Malaysia-based AirAsia. Indonesia AirAsia is listed in category 1 by the Indonesian Civil Aviation Authority for airline safety quality.

== History ==
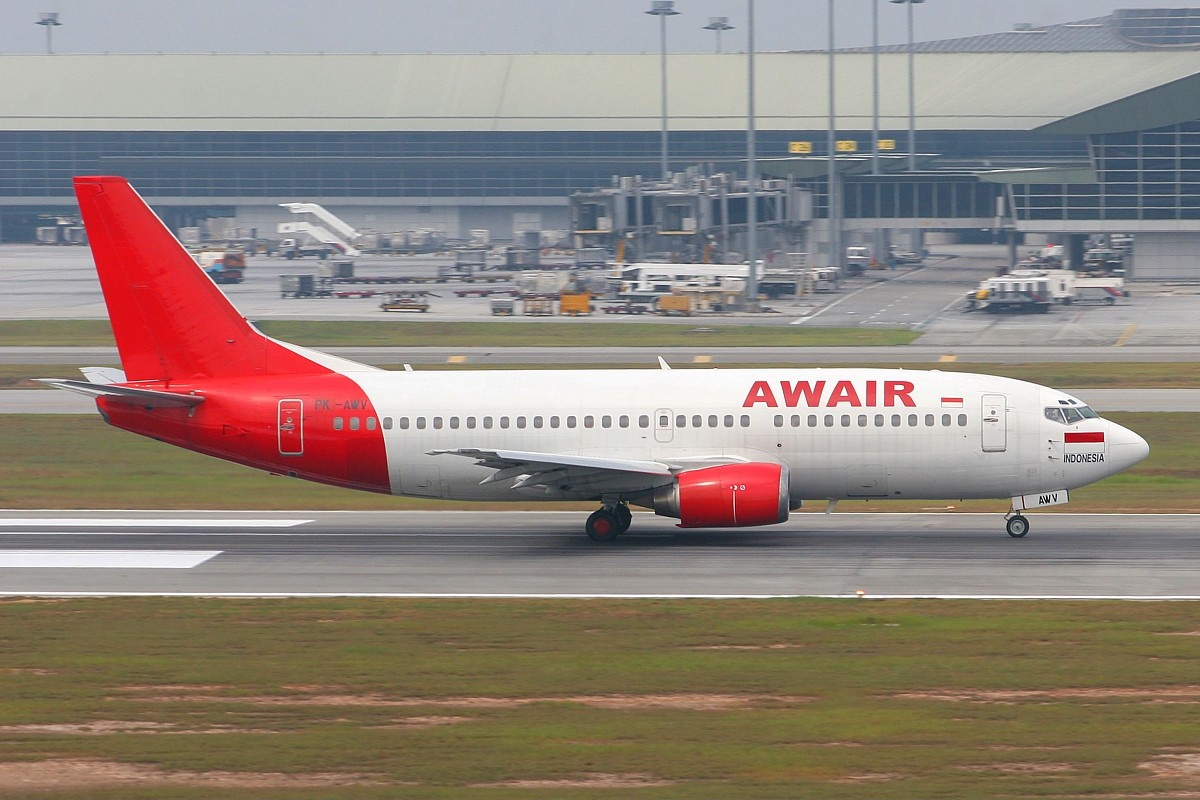
An Awair Boeing 737-300 in September 2005; the airline would later be known as Indonesia AirAsia

=== Awair (1999–2005) ===
The airline was established as Awair (Air Wagon International) in 1999 by then-President of Indonesia Abdurrahman Wahid, who was chairman of Nahdlatul Ulama, the largest Muslim organisation in Indonesia. Wahid had a 40% stake in the airline which he relinquished after being elected president of Indonesia in late October 1999. The airline started operations on 22 June 2000 with Airbus A300, A310 and A320 aircraft, but all flights were suspended in March 2002. Awair restarted operating domestically within Indonesia as an associate of AirAsia in January 2005.

=== Indonesia AirAsia ===
On 1 December 2005, Awair changed its name to Indonesia AirAsia in line with other AirAsia branded airlines in the region. AirAsia Berhad has a 49% share in the airline, with Fersindo Nusaperkasa owning 51%. Indonesia's laws disallow majority foreign ownership on domestic civil aviation operations.

The airline, along with many others in Indonesia, was previously banned from flying to the EU. However, its ban was lifted in July 2010, together with Batavia Air. In 2011, the company appointed CIMB Securities Indonesia and Credit Suisse Securities Indonesia as joint-lead underwriters for the 20 percent IPO in the fourth quarter of that year.

=== Batavia Air acquisition (2012–2013) ===
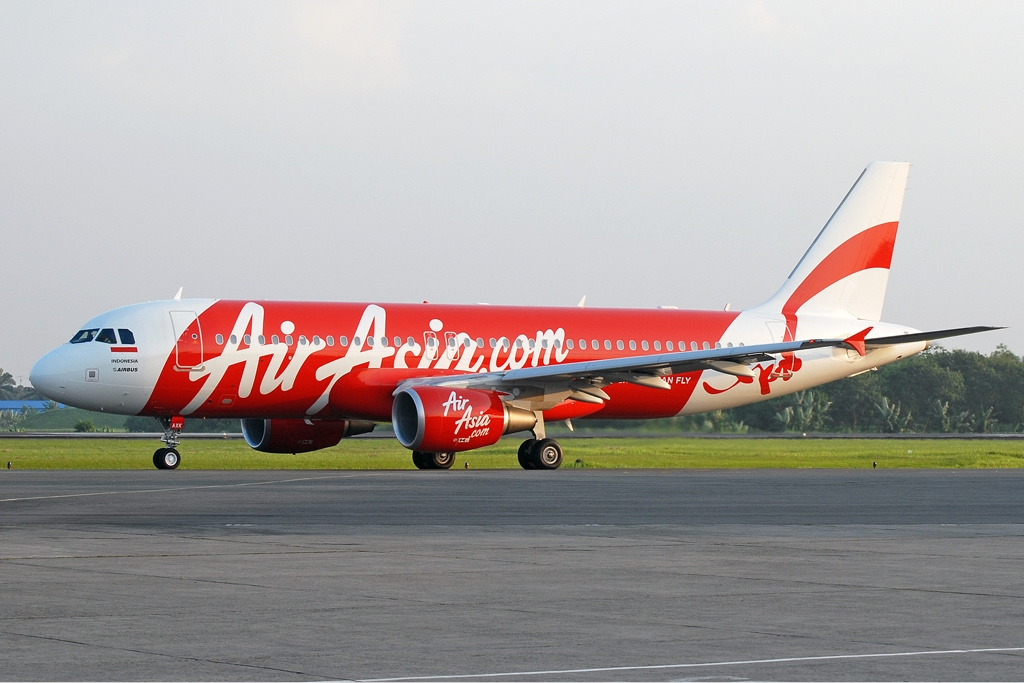
Indonesia AirAsia Airbus A320 in the old red and white livery

A buy out of Batavia Air was announced on 26 July 2012, that was to be done in two stages; AirAsia would buy 76.95% shares from Metro Batavia in a partnership with Fersindo Nusaperkasa (Indonesia AirAsia). Following that, by 2013, AirAsia was to acquire the remaining 23.05% held by other shareholders. The acquisition of Batavia Air by AirAsia Berhad and Fersindo created some controversy with Indonesian regulators at the time, concerned that Batavia would be majority-owned by a non-Indonesian entity.

By 11 October 2012 the deal between AirAsia Berhad, Fersindo Nusaperkasa (Indonesia AirAsia) and PT Metro Batavia had been dropped, citing high risks associated with the ailing airline.

When the cancellation of the planned takeover between Batavia and AirAsia was announced on 11 October 2012, a joint statement was issued announcing a plan to proceed with an alliance encompassing ground handling, distribution and inventory systems in Indonesia. The statement also announced a plan to deliver operational alliances between Batavia and the AirAsia group.

Batavia and Indonesia AirAsia announced a plan to form a separate joint venture to provide a regional pilot training centre in Indonesia. No details were provided on that new alliance when it was announced in early October 2012.

On 15 February 2013, the airline confirmed that it no longer had intentions to buy Batavia Air, following PT Metro Batavia's bankruptcy announcement on 30 January 2013.

=== Indonesia AirAsia X (2015) ===
In January 2015, the airline launched a long haul subsidiary named Indonesia AirAsia X, in a joint venture with its Malaysian counterpart, AirAsia X. The Indonesia AirAsia subsidiary became the country's first long haul low-cost carrier and was based at Ngurah Rai Airport in Denpasar, Bali. It flew its maiden flight on 30 January of that year with a flight from Denpasar to Taipei with an Airbus A330-300.

On 28 June 2016, Indonesia AirAsia launched the Auto Bag Drop facility at Ngurah Rai International Airport. On 12 August 2016, AirAsia Indonesia moved its flight operations from Terminal 3 to Terminal 2 at Soekarno–Hatta International Airport in preparation of the opening of the main section of Terminal 3. The airline later consolidated its flight operations at Terminal 2 on 12 December 2018, following the full opening of the Garuda Indonesia-occupied Terminal 3.

On 2 May 2019, Indonesia AirAsia inaugurates Lombok as its fifth operating base in Indonesia in addition to its existing bases in Soekarno–Hatta International Airport in Jakarta, Ngurah Rai International Airport in Bali, Kuala Namu International Airport in Medan and Juanda International Airport in Surabaya.

=== COVID-19 pandemic (2020–2022) ===
In March 2020, its long haul subsidiary, Indonesia AirAsia X, ceased flights due to the effects of the COVID-19 pandemic. The long haul arm later announced its permanent closure in October 2022, following restructuring plans of the AirAsia Group.

In July 2021, the company announced that it will temporarily stop all flights for a month from 6 July 2021 to support the government's effort to limit a spike in COVID-19 cases. The airline later resumed operations on October 2, 2021 following a two month suspension of flights.

In January 2022, Indonesia AirAsia announced the resumption of all remaining routes that were suspended from July 2022. In April 2022, the airline again announced a terminal change at Soekarno Hatta International Airport, thereby splitting its operations between Terminal 1 for domestic flights and Terminal 3 for international flights.

In February 2023, the airline announced the reactivation of its remaining eight parked aircraft from its fleet of 25 Airbus A320-200s, with a plan to acquire eight further Airbus A320s. Furthermore, the airline stated its intentions to resume long haul service to Japan and South Korea, as well as introduce new services to China and India with the acquisition of Airbus A330-900 aircraft from Thai AirAsia in 2023. But as of July 2026, these plans have not come into fruition.

== Corporate affairs ==
The airline's head office is in Tangerang, Banten, adjacent to Soekarno–Hatta International Airport. It has the AirAsia logo on its roof and uses natural lighting. As of 2013 over 2,000 employees work there. Prior to the building's 2013 opening, the airline's employees worked in several offices in Jakarta. They were divided between Terminal 1A of Soekarno-Hatta Airport, Soewarna, and Menara Batavia.

== Destinations ==
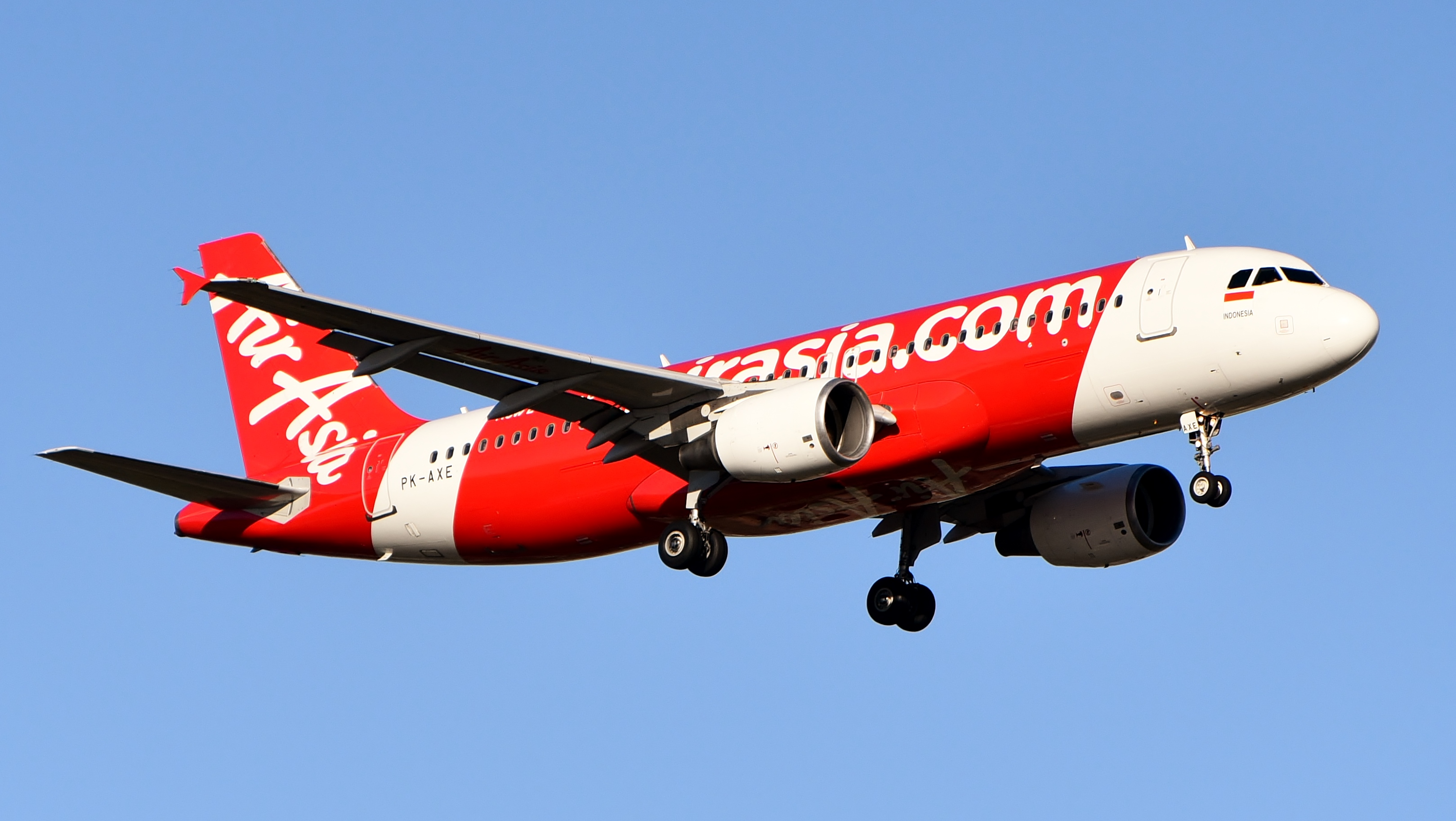
Indonesia AirAsia Airbus A320-200

As of July 2026, Indonesia AirAsia flies (or has flown) to the following destinations:

Country	City	Airport	Notes	Refs
Australia	Adelaide	Adelaide Airport	Terminated	
Australia	Cairns	Cairns Airport	Terminated	
Australia	Darwin	Darwin International Airport	Terminated	
Australia	Melbourne	Melbourne Airport	Terminated	
Australia	Perth	Perth Airport		
Brunei	Bandar Seri Begawan	Brunei International Airport		
Cambodia	Phnom Penh	Phnom Penh International Airport	Airport closed	
Cambodia	Phnom Penh	Techo International Airport		
China	Shenzhen	Shenzhen Bao'an International Airport	Terminated	
Hong Kong	Hong Kong	Hong Kong International Airport		
India	Kolkata	Netaji Subhas Chandra Bose International Airport	Terminated	
Indonesia	Ambon	Pattimura Airport	Terminated	
Indonesia	Balikpapan	Sultan Aji Muhammad Sulaiman Sepinggan Airport		
Indonesia	Banda Aceh	Sultan Iskandar Muda International Airport	Terminated	
Indonesia	Bandar Lampung	Radin Inten II International Airport		
Indonesia	Bandung	Husein Sastranegara Airport	Terminated	
Indonesia	Bandung	Kertajati International Airport	Terminated	
Indonesia	Banjarmasin	Syamsudin Noor International Airport	Terminated	
Indonesia	Banyuwangi	Banyuwangi Airport	Terminated	
Indonesia	Berau	Kalimarau Airport		
Indonesia	Denpasar	Ngurah Rai International Airport	Base	
Indonesia	Jakarta	Soekarno–Hatta International Airport	Base	
Indonesia	Kendari	Haluoleo Airport		
Indonesia	Kupang	El Tari Airport	Terminated	
Indonesia	Labuan Bajo	Komodo International Airport		
Indonesia	Luwuk	Syukuran Aminuddin Amir Airport		
Indonesia	Makassar	Sultan Hasanuddin International Airport		
Indonesia	Manado	Sam Ratulangi International Airport	Terminated	
Indonesia	Mataram	Lombok International Airport		
Indonesia	Medan	Kualanamu International Airport	Base	
Indonesia	Medan	Polonia International Airport	Airport closed	
Indonesia	Padang	Minangkabau International Airport	Terminated	
Indonesia	Palembang	Sultan Mahmud Badaruddin II International Airport	Terminated	
Indonesia	Palu	Mutiara SIS Al-Jufrie Airport		
Indonesia	Pekanbaru	Sultan Syarif Kasim II International Airport	Terminated	
Indonesia	Pontianak	Supadio International Airport	Terminated	
Indonesia	Samarinda	Aji Pangeran Tumenggung Pranoto International Airport	Terminated	
Indonesia	Semarang	Jenderal Ahmad Yani International Airport	Terminated	
Indonesia	Silangit	Raja Sisingamangaraja XII Airport		
Indonesia	Solo	Adisoemarmo International Airport	Terminated	
Indonesia	Sorong	Domine Eduard Osok Airport	Terminated	
Indonesia	Surabaya	Juanda International Airport	Base	
Indonesia	Tanjung Pandan	H.A.S. Hanandjoeddin International Airport	Terminated	
Indonesia	Tarakan	Juwata Airport		
Indonesia	Yogyakarta	Adisutjipto Airport	Terminated	
Indonesia	Yogyakarta	Yogyakarta International Airport	Terminated	
Macau	Macau	Macau International Airport	Terminated	
Malaysia	Johor Bahru	Senai International Airport		
Malaysia	Kota Kinabalu	Kota Kinabalu International Airport		
Malaysia	Kuala Lumpur	Kuala Lumpur International Airport		
Malaysia	Kuching	Kuching International Airport		
Malaysia	Penang	Penang International Airport		
Philippines	Manila	Ninoy Aquino International Airport	Terminated	
Singapore	Singapore	Changi Airport	Terminated	
Thailand	Bangkok	Don Mueang International Airport		
Thailand	Bangkok	Suvarnabhumi Airport	Terminated	
Thailand	Phuket	Phuket International Airport		
Vietnam	Da Nang	Da Nang International Airport		
Vietnam	Ho Chi Minh City	Tan Son Nhat International Airport	Terminated	

== Fleet ==
=== Current fleet ===
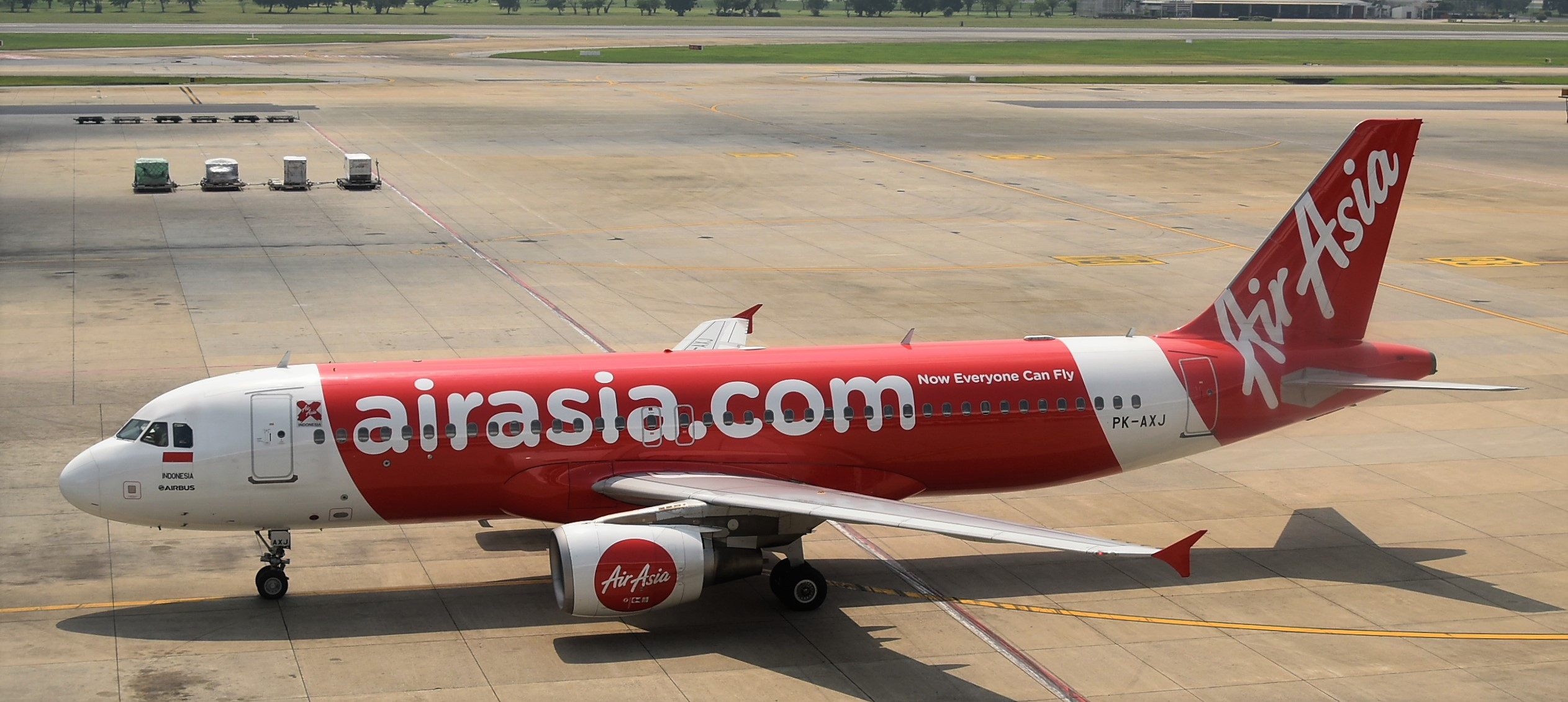
An Indonesia AirAsia Airbus A320-200 at Bangkok Don Mueang International Airport

As of July 2026, Indonesia AirAsia operates the following aircraft:

Indonesia AirAsia fleet
Aircraft	In service	Orders	Passengers	Notes
Airbus A320-200	27	-	180	
Total	27	-		

=== Former fleet ===
As of August 2025, Indonesia AirAsia operated 26 Airbus A320.

=== Special liveries ===
Image	Livery	Aircraft
Airasia PK-AXU in Lombok livery	Lombok livery	Airbus A320-200
	Connecting Labuan Bajo to the world	Airbus A320-200
PK-AZS_(22_Jan_2025)	Sustainable ASEAN Tourism livery	Airbus A320-200
	AirAsia Mobile Apps livery	Airbus A320-200

== Incidents and accidents ==
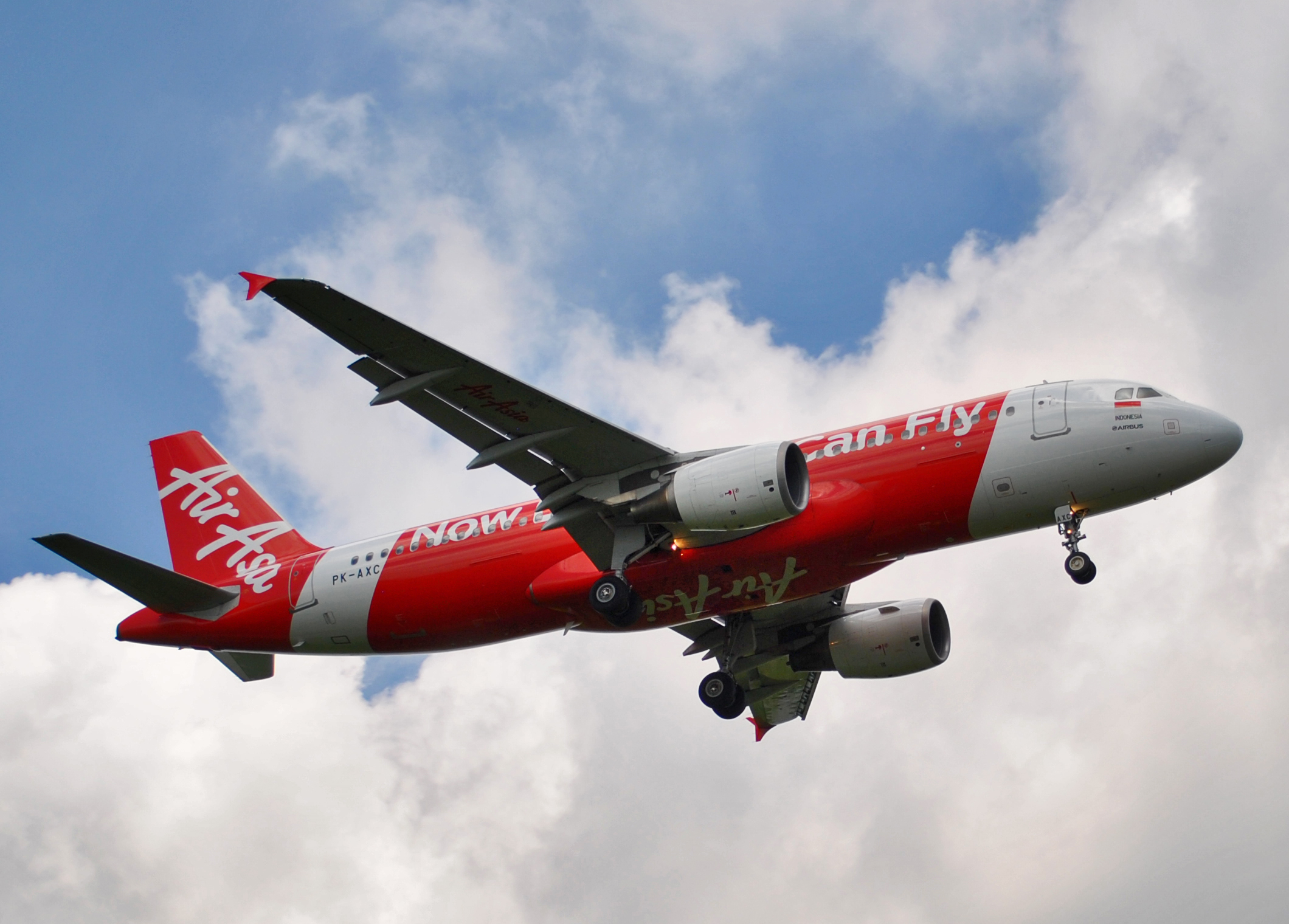
PK-AXC, the aircraft involved as Indonesia AirAsia Flight 8501, 2014

- 28 December 2014: Indonesia AirAsia Flight 8501, an Airbus A320-200 registered PK-AXC (MSN 3648) with 155 passengers and 7 crew on board, crashed into the Java Sea whilst en route from Juanda International Airport in Surabaya to Changi Airport in Singapore, killing all 162 on board. Regulatory licenses for the Surabaya-Singapore route as well as Medan-Palembang route have been suspended for Indonesia AirAsia since January 2015 due to suspected licensing breaches; however, the Medan-Palembang route has been resumed.

== See also ==
- Philippines AirAsia
- AirAsia X
- Thai AirAsia
- Indonesia AirAsia X
- Aviation in Indonesia
