= Indonesia AirAsia X =

Low-cost airline of Indonesia (2014–2019)

PT Indonesia AirAsia Extra
IATA	ICAO	Call sign
XT	IDX	RED PHOENIX
- Founded: October 2014
- Commenced operations: 19 January 2015
- Ceased operations: 14 January 2019
- Operating bases: Denpasar; Jakarta–Soekarno-Hatta
- Parent company: AirAsia X
- Headquarters: Jakarta, Indonesia
- Key people: Dendy Kurniawan (CEO)
- Website: www.airasia.com

Indonesia AirAsia X was a joint venture of Malaysian long haul low-fare airline AirAsia X and Indonesia AirAsia. The airline ceased all operations on 14 January 2019.

== History ==
Indonesia AirAsia X is the medium and long-haul operation of the brand Indonesia AirAsia. The franchise keeps costs down by using a common ticketing system, aircraft livery, employee uniforms, and management style. It served two scheduled long haul international flights from Bali's I Gusti Ngurah Rai International Airport to Mumbai and Tokyo until they were both ceased. It also served short haul flights using an Airbus A320-200 from Jakarta, Denpasar and Surabaya, replacing some of Indonesia AirAsia's flights.

Indonesia AirAsia X planned to launch its first destination to Melbourne on 26 December 2014, but had not achieved authorisation from both the Australian or Indonesian governments to fly the route. This led to huge disruption to passengers during the peak holiday season, with many flights delayed or cancelled outright. In January 2015, Taipei was announced as the airline's first route from Bali. The inaugural flight was commenced on 19 January 2015, but ended flights in September 2015.

In late November 2018, the airline announced that it would cease scheduled operations beginning in January 2019. The carrier would still remain in operation, but would operate as a non-scheduled commercial airline going forward. The airline operated its last scheduled flight to Tokyo on 14 January 2019. Indonesia AirAsia X ceased all operations on October 17, 2020, and was liquidated as part of the restructuring of AirAsia along with AirAsia Japan, which also ceased for a similar reason.

== Destinations ==
During its five-year existence, Indonesia AirAsia X flew to the following destinations:

Australia

- Melbourne – Melbourne Airport
- Sydney – Sydney Airport

India

- Mumbai – Chhatrapati Shivaji Maharaj International Airport

Indonesia

- Denpasar – Ngurah Rai International Airport (base)
- Jakarta – Soekarno–Hatta International Airport (main base)
- Surabaya – Juanda International Airport,
- Surakarta – Adisumarmo International Airport
- Yogyakarta – Adisucipto Airport

Japan

- Tokyo – Narita International Airport

Malaysia

- Johor Bahru – Senai International Airport
- Kuala Lumpur – Kuala Lumpur International Airport
- Penang – Penang International Airport

Saudi Arabia

- Jeddah – King Abdulaziz International Airport

Thailand

- Bangkok – Don Mueang International Airport

Taiwan

- Taipei – Taoyuan International Airport

== Fleet ==
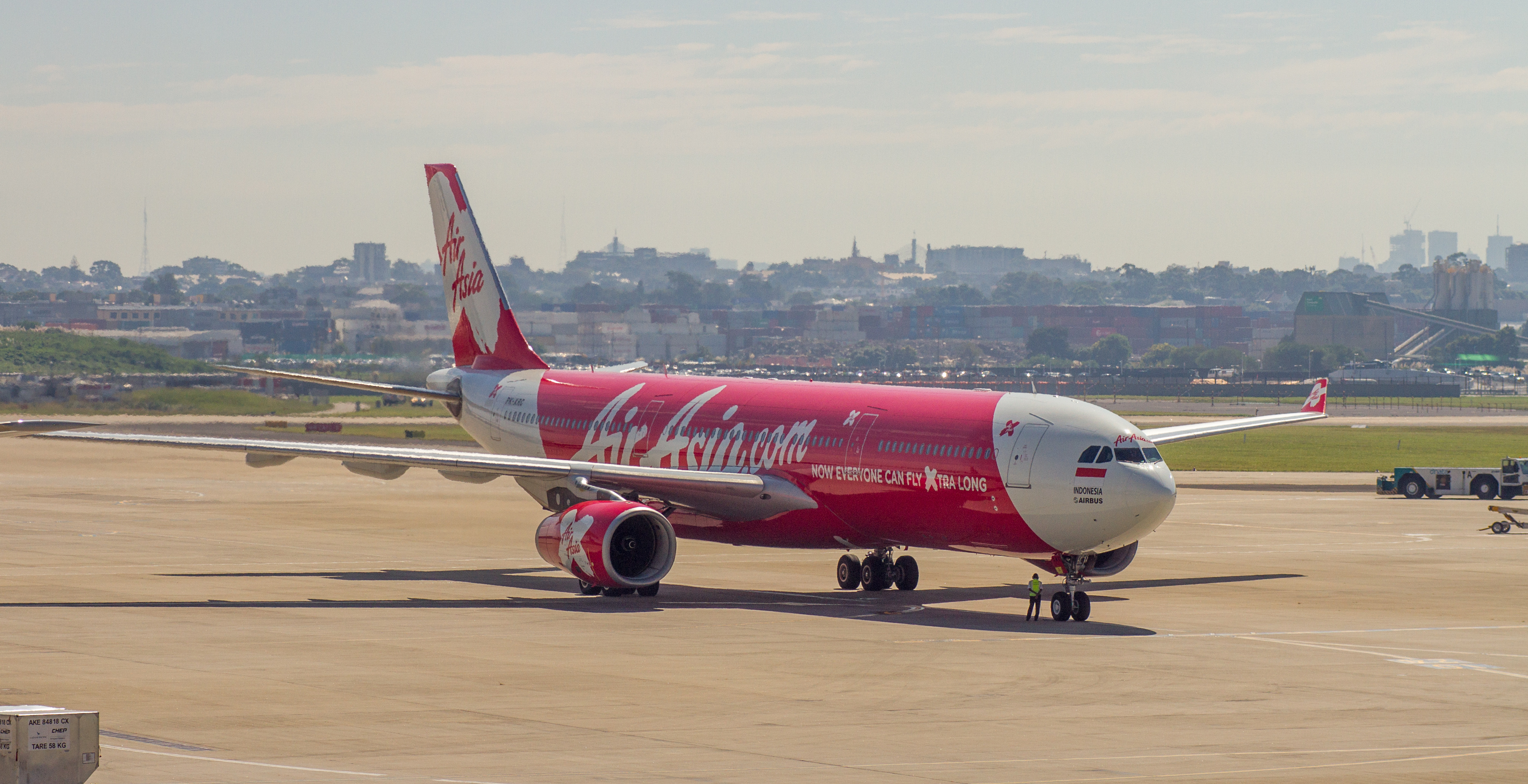
An Indonesia AirAsia X Airbus A330-300 taxiing at Sydney Airport in 2016

The Indonesia AirAsia X fleet comprised two Airbus A330-300s. Indonesia AirAsia X had also operated five Airbus A320-200s to fulfill the Indonesian government regulation for a new airline to operate at least 10 aircraft within its first year of operation. The aircraft were transferred back to Indonesia AirAsia in October 2018.

As of August 2019 (shortly before closure), Indonesia AirAsia X operated the following aircraft:

Indonesia AirAsia X fleet
Aircraft	In service	Orders	Passengers			Notes
Aircraft	In service	Orders	P	Y	Total	Notes
Airbus A330-300	2	—	12	365	377	
Total	2	—				

== See also ==
- AirAsia
- AirAsia X
- Indonesia AirAsia
- Tune Ventures
- Transport in Indonesia
