= Thai AirAsia X =

Low-cost airline of Thailand, operating long-haul flights

Thai AirAsia X ไทยแอร์เอเชีย เอกซ์

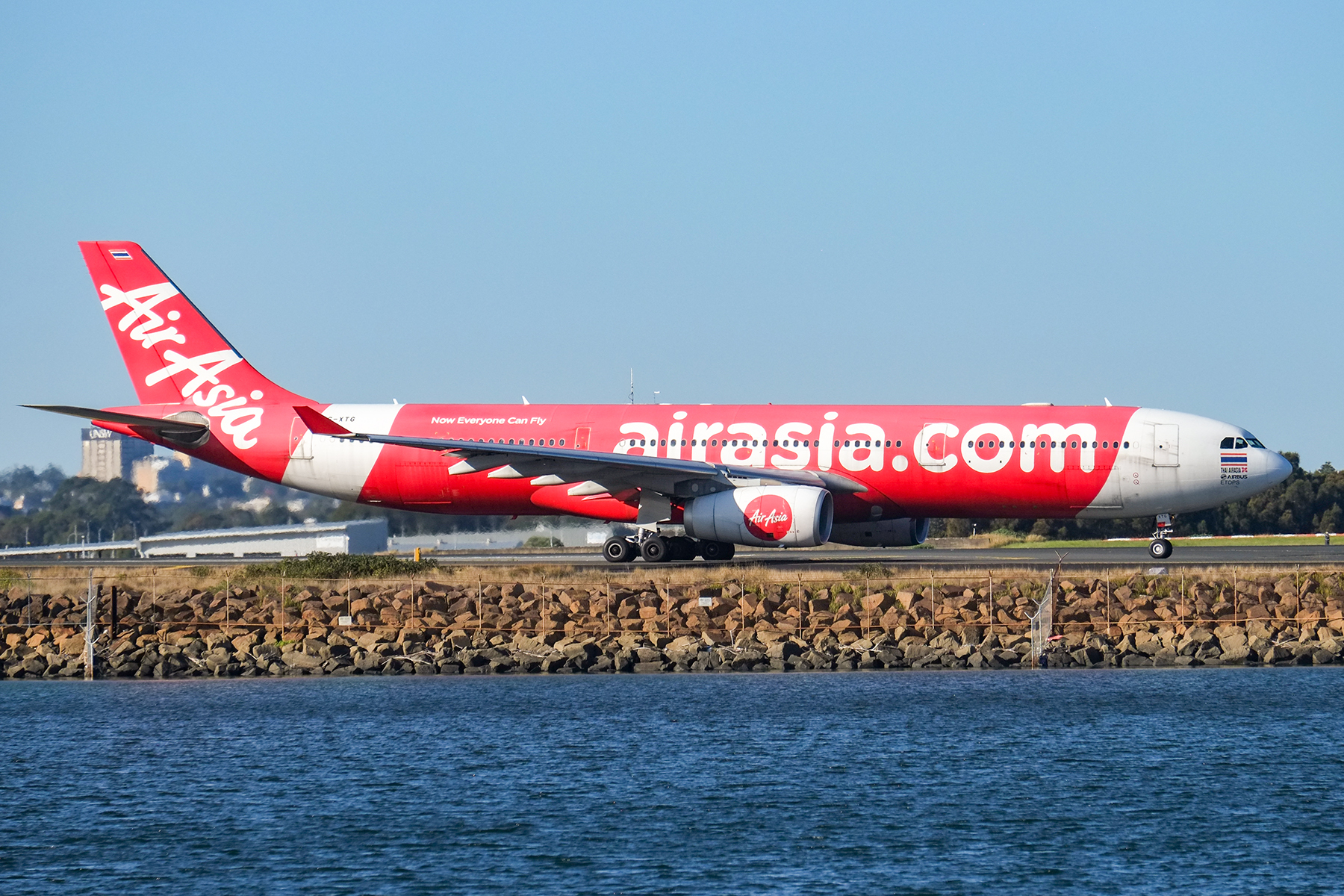
- Thai AirAsia X Airbus A330
IATA	ICAO	Call sign
XJ	TAX	EXPRESS WING
- Founded: 18 September 2013; 13 years ago
- Commenced operations: 17 June 2014; 12 years ago
- Operating bases: Don Mueang International Airport
- Frequent-flyer program: AirAsia Rewards
- Fleet size: 11
- Destinations: 11
- Parent company: AirAsia Group Berhad (49%); Tassapon Bijleveld and local Thai investors (51%)
- Headquarters: Don Mueang, Bangkok, Thailand
- Key people: Patima Jeerapaet; Nadda Buranasiri
- Website: www.airasia.com

Thai AirAsia X is a Thai long-haul low-cost airline based at Don Mueang International Airport in Bangkok. It is a joint venture of AirAsia X from Malaysia and Thai AirAsia.

== History ==
On 18 September 2013, AirAsia X signed a shareholders agreement with Tassapon Bijleveld and Julpas Krueospon to establish a joint venture co-operation for a long-haul low-cost airline, a Thai company named Thai AirAsia X Company Limited was started in which AirAsia took a 49% share. Thai AirAsia X is the medium and long-haul operation of the brand Thai AirAsia. The franchise can keep costs down by using a common ticketing system, aircraft livery, employee uniforms, and management style.

On 3 February 2014, Thai AirAsia X received an Air Operators Certificate (AOC) from the Department of Civil Aviation of Thailand which allowed the airline to apply for permits and slots for the intended routes. On 17 June 2014, Thai AirAsia X operated its first flight from Bangkok to Seoul with an Airbus A330-300. Following destinations were Osaka and Tokyo on 1 September 2014.

In December 2016, Thai AirAsia X announced the end of services to the Middle East by subsequently cancelling all flights to Tehran and Muscat.

In August 2019, Thai AirAsia X took delivery of its first Airbus A330neo aircraft.

Due to lockdown measures, all domestic flights in July 2021 were canceled. In October 2021, Thai Asia X announced the resumption of flights at Suvarnabhumi Airport for the next month.

On 26 April 2022 Thai AirAsia X announced that it would be moving its Bangkok operations from Don Mueang International Airport to Suvarnabhumi Airport. On 19 May 2022 Thai AirAsia X filed for bankruptcy with the Central Bankruptcy Court in Bangkok, however the process would have no impact on passengers, as operations continue as usual.

== Destinations ==
As of May 2026, Thai AirAsia X flies (or has flown) to the following destinations:

Country	City	Airport	Notes	Refs
Australia	Brisbane	Brisbane Airport	Terminated	
Australia	Melbourne	Melbourne Airport	Terminated	
Australia	Sydney	Sydney Airport	Terminated	
China	Harbin	Harbin Taiping International Airport	Seasonal	
China	Nanchang	Nanchang Changbei International Airport	Terminated	
China	Shanghai	Shanghai Pudong International Airport		
China	Shenyang	Shenyang Taoxian International Airport	Terminated	
China	Tianjin	Tianjin Binhai International Airport	Terminated	
Croatia	Zagreb	Zagreb Airport	Terminated	
Georgia	Tbilisi	Tbilisi International Airport	Terminated	
India	Delhi	Indira Gandhi International Airport		
Iran	Tehran	Imam Khomeini International Airport	Terminated	
Japan	Fukuoka	Fukuoka Airport	Terminated	
Japan	Nagoya	Chubu Centrair International Airport		
Japan	Osaka	Kansai International Airport		
Japan	Sapporo	New Chitose Airport		
Japan	Sendai	Sendai Airport		
Japan	Tokyo	Narita International Airport		
Kazakhstan	Almaty	Almaty International Airport		
Oman	Muscat	Muscat International Airport	Terminated	
Saudi Arabia	Riyadh	King Khalid International Airport		
South Korea	Seoul	Incheon International Airport	Terminated	
Thailand	Bangkok	Don Mueang International Airport	Base	
Thailand	Bangkok	Suvarnabhumi Airport	Terminated	
Thailand	Phuket	Phuket International Airport	Terminated	

== Fleet ==
=== Current fleet ===
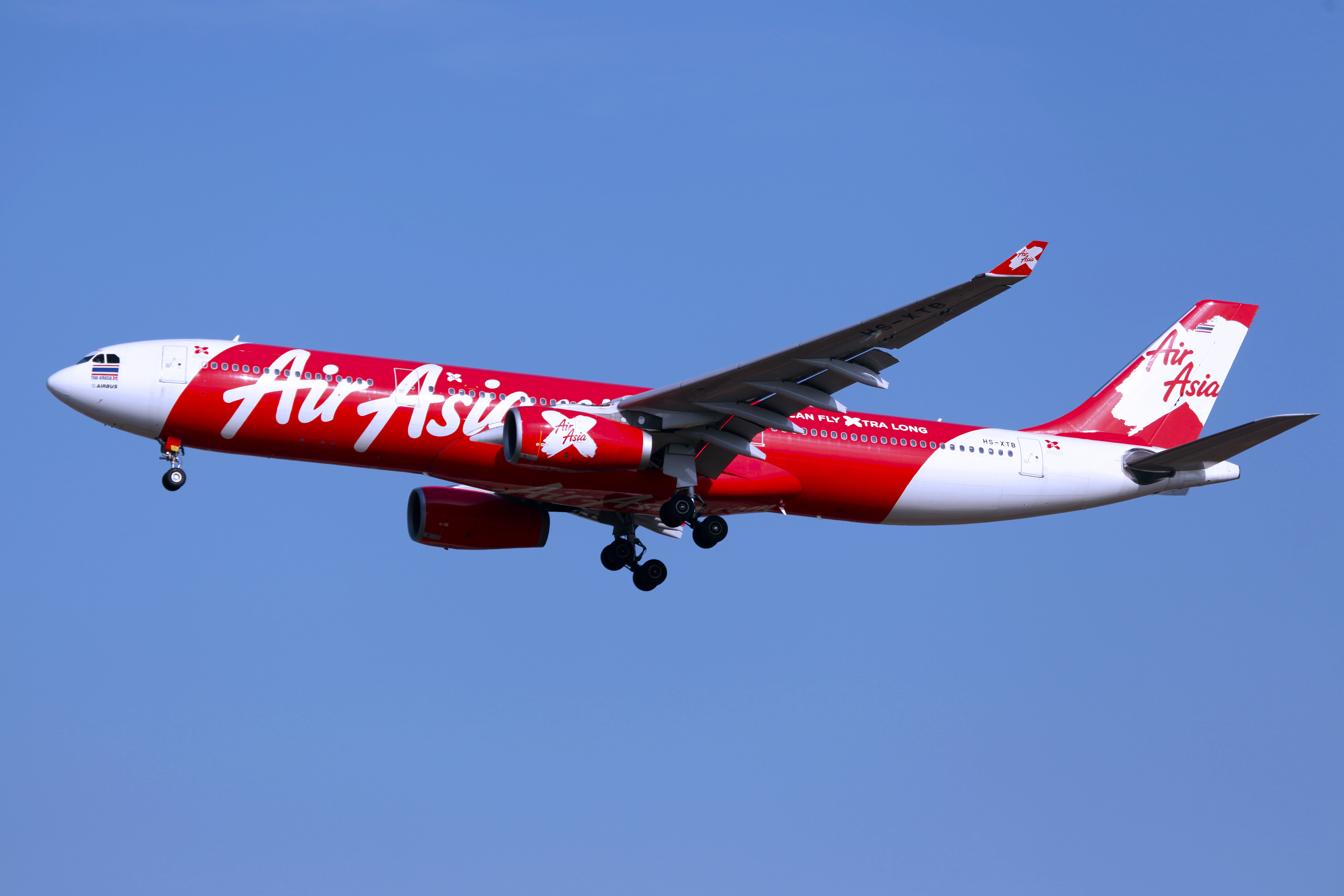
Thai AirAsia X Airbus A330-300

As of August 2025, Thai AirAsia X operates the following aircraft:

Thai AirAsia X fleet
Aircraft	In service	Orders	Passengers			Notes
Aircraft	In service	Orders	P	E	Total	Notes
Airbus A330-300	11	—	12	365	377	
Airbus A330-300	11	—	—	367	367	
Total	11	—				

== See also ==
- AirAsia
- AirAsia X
- Thai AirAsia
- Tune Ventures
- Transport in Thailand
