= AirAsia =

Low-cost airline of Malaysia

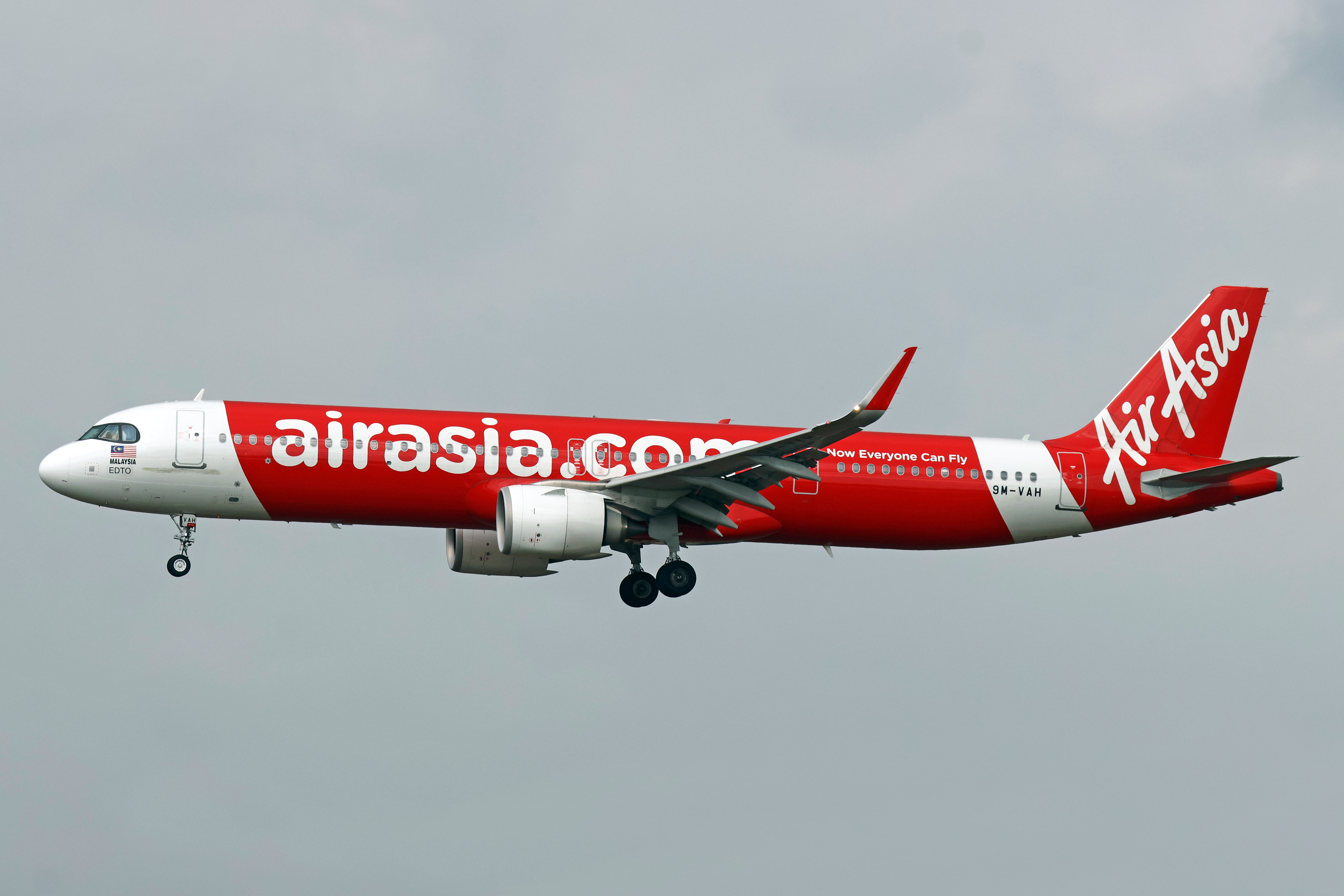
- An AirAsia Airbus A321neo
IATA	ICAO	Call sign
AK	AXM	RED CAP
- Founded: 20 December 1993; 32 years ago
- Commenced operations: 18 November 1996; 30 years ago
- Operating bases: Johor Bahru; Kota Kinabalu; Kuala Lumpur (T2); Kuching; Penang
- Frequent-flyer program: AirAsia Rewards
- Subsidiaries: AirAsia Cambodia; AirAsia X; Indonesia AirAsia; Philippines AirAsia; Thai AirAsia; Thai AirAsia X
- Fleet size: 111
- Destinations: 166 (including subsidiaries)
- Parent company: Tune Group
- Traded as: MYX: 5238
- ISIN: MYL5238OO000
- Headquarters: Kuala Lumpur International Airport, Selangor, Malaysia
- Revenue: ▲RM 1.50 billion (2024)
- Operating income: ▼RM −919 million (2024)
- Net income: ▼RM −491 million (2024)
- Total assets: ▲RM 28.98 billion (2024)
- Total equity: ▲RM −10.1 billion (2024)
- Employees: 23,000 (2023)
- Website: www.airasia.com

Notes
- Financials are from Bursa Malaysia.

AirAsia Group Berhad (MYX: 5238), operating as AirAsia, is a Malaysian multinational low-cost airline headquartered near Kuala Lumpur, Malaysia. Established in 1993 and commencing operations in 1996, the airline is the largest in Malaysia by fleet size and destinations. It operates scheduled domestic and international flights to over 166 destinations across 25 countries. Its primary hub is Kuala Lumpur International Airport (KLIA), where it operates from Terminal 2, the low-cost carrier terminal.

Following the merger of AirAsia X into AirAsia Group, the company operates both short-haul and long-haul services under a unified airline network. Its regional operations include affiliates such as Thai AirAsia, Indonesia AirAsia, Philippines AirAsia and AirAsia Cambodia, which have bases in cities including Bangkok, Jakarta, Manila and Phnom Penh respectively. The group also operates cargo and logistics services through Teleport, connecting Southeast Asia with markets across Asia, Australia, Africa and the Middle East.

== History ==
=== 1993–2001: Foundation and early years ===
AirAsia was established on 20 December 1993, by DRB-HICOM, a Malaysian government-owned conglomerate, as a full-service carrier. The airline commenced operations on 18 November 1996, with its inaugural flight from Kuala Lumpur to Langkawi, utilising a Boeing 737-300. In its early years, AirAsia faced challenges such as high operating costs and heavy competition from established carriers like Malaysia Airlines.

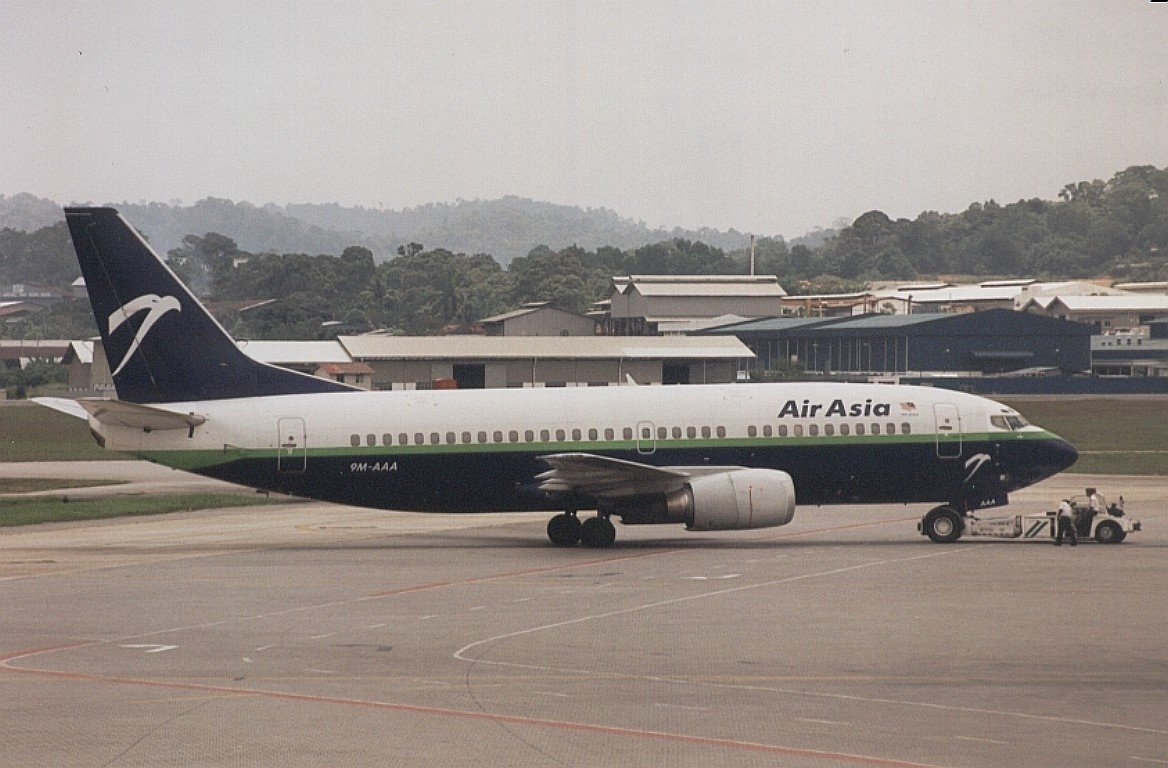
A Boeing 737-300 in AirAsia's original livery at Sultan Abdul Aziz Shah Airport, which served as a previous hub, during the airline's period as a government-owned full-service carrier

By the late 1990s, AirAsia had accumulated substantial debts, amounting to approximately MYR 40 million (around US$10.5 million). Efforts to stabilise the airline included route expansion, leasing aircraft for Hajj charters and internal discussions about potential management changes.

However, these initiatives were insufficient to address the airline's structural issues. The situation deteriorated further following the global aviation downturn after the September 11 attacks. By September 2001, AirAsia’s debt had risen to around US$11 million, leaving the company on the brink of collapse.

=== 2001–2002: Transformation into a low-cost carrier ===
On 5 September 2001, Tony Fernandes and Kamarudin Meranun acquired AirAsia through their company Tune Air Sdn Bhd for a nominal sum of one ringgit (approximately US$0.26), taking on its considerable liabilities. Fernandes, a former executive at Time Warner (now known as Warner Bros. Discovery), saw an opportunity to transform AirAsia into a low-cost carrier, inspired by the success of airlines such as Southwest Airlines and Ryanair. This acquisition marked a turning point in AirAsia’s history, setting the stage for its reinvention as a budget airline.

After the acquisition, Fernandes and his team rebranded the airline as a low-cost carrier on 15 January 2002 by adopting a no-frills service model, enabling AirAsia to offer fares that were significantly lower than those of its competitors, particularly Malaysia Airlines. Promotional fares started as low as MYR 10 (approximately US$2.60), which attracted a large number of passengers.

In its first year under the low-cost model, AirAsia achieved profitability, marking a significant recovery from its previous financial challenges. The airline focused on point-to-point routes and utilised secondary airports, which helped lower operational costs and improve overall efficiency.

=== 2003–2006: Expansion into new markets ===
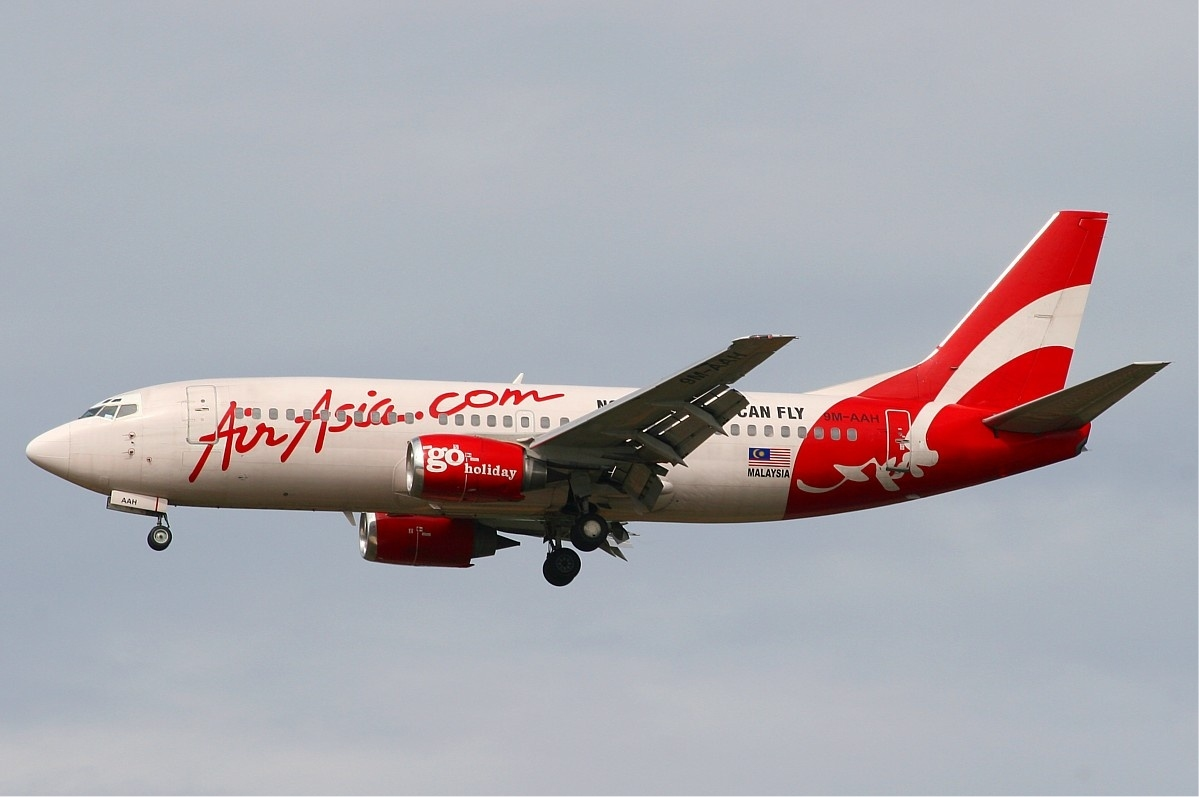
An AirAsia Boeing 737-375 in the livery used between 2002 and 2005, reflecting the airline's transition to a low-cost carrier model following the Tune Group acquisition

Between 2003 and 2006, AirAsia embarked on a rapid expansion of its routes and infrastructure. In December 2003, the airline established a second hub at Senai International Airport in Johor Bahru, expanding its operational reach. AirAsia also began international operations with flights to Phuket in December 2003, to Bangkok in February 2004, and to Manila and Xiamen by April 2005.

In 2002, the airline became the first in Asia to introduce ticketless travel via online bookings. The airline also launched SMS booking services, allowing customers to book flights directly from their mobile phones. In 2003, Thai AirAsia was founded, and in 2005, Indonesia AirAsia was launched. These affiliates allowed the airline to enter new markets, strengthening its regional presence across Southeast Asia.

By the end of 2006, AirAsia’s fleet had seen substantial growth, consisting of 35 Boeing 737-300s and eight Airbus A320s. Additionally, the airline placed orders for 100 more Airbus A320 aircraft, which helped increase its capacity and frequency of flights, supporting its expanding network.

=== 2006–2012: Further expansion ===
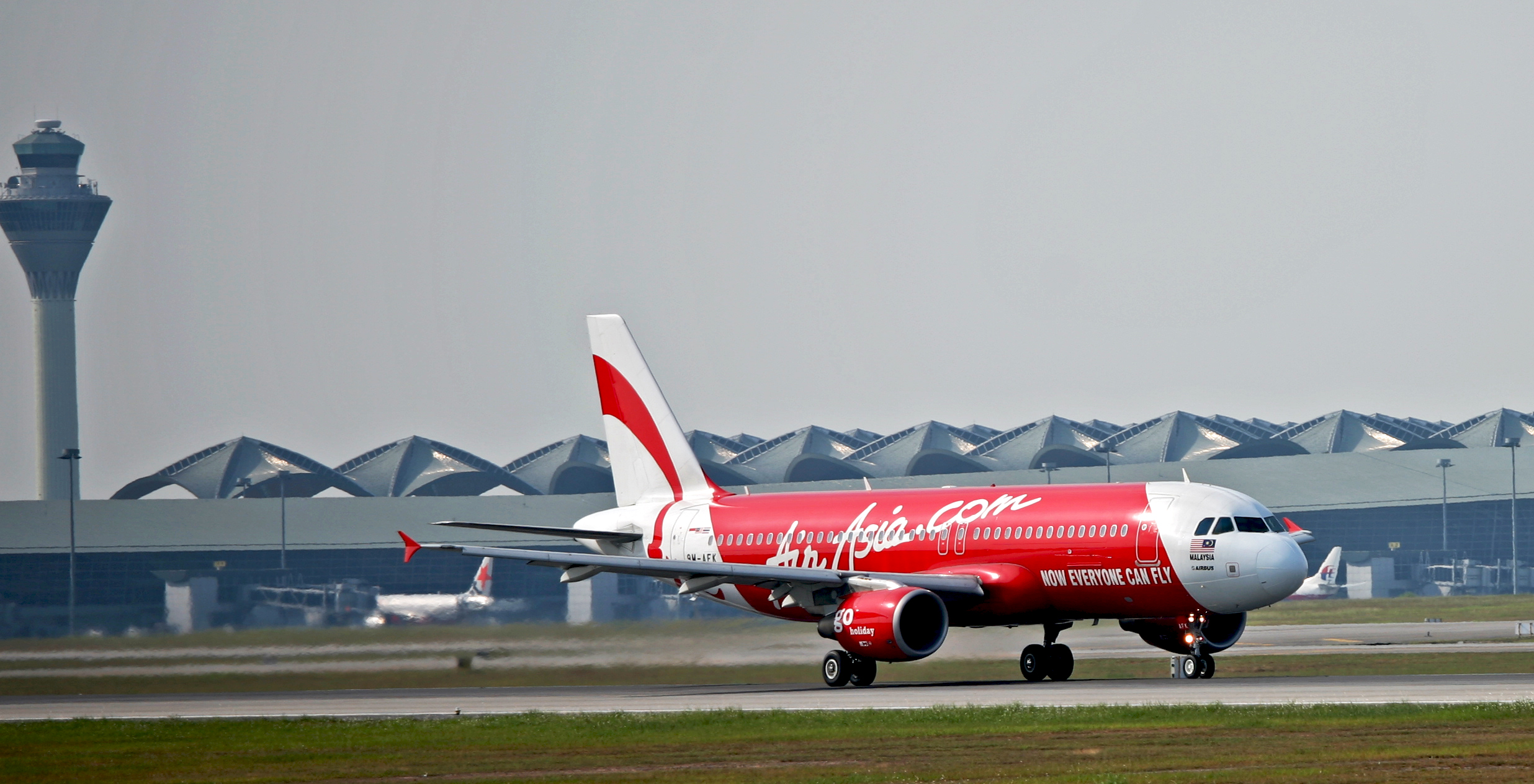
An Airbus A320 departing Kuala Lumpur International Airport. The A320 has served as the workhorse of AirAsia's fleet since 2005.

In late 2006, AirAsia's CEO Tony Fernandes introduced a five-year plan designed to strengthen the airline's presence across Asia. The strategy focused on enhancing connectivity between existing destinations and expanding into new markets such as Vietnam, Indonesia, Southern China and India. As part of this effort, Kota Kinabalu became a hub on 7 July 2006, followed by Kuching on 20 July 2006. These initiatives led to a significant increase in passenger traffic, with AirAsia carrying about 13.9 million passengers in 2007, compared to 9.3 million in 2006.

In February 2008, four years after AirAsia first started operating in Singapore through affiliate Thai AirAsia's flights from Bangkok, the main airline began operating the Kuala Lumpur–Singapore route.

AirAsia expanded its offerings further in 2009 by launching Redbox, the world’s first low-cost courier service. The same year, the airline began flights from Penang to Hong Kong, adding Penang as another hub in its network.

In 2011, AirAsia entered into a controversial share swap agreement with Malaysia Airlines, aiming to reduce competition between the two carriers. However, due to regulatory concerns, this partnership was dissolved in early 2012.

=== 2013–2019: Strategic developments and challenges ===
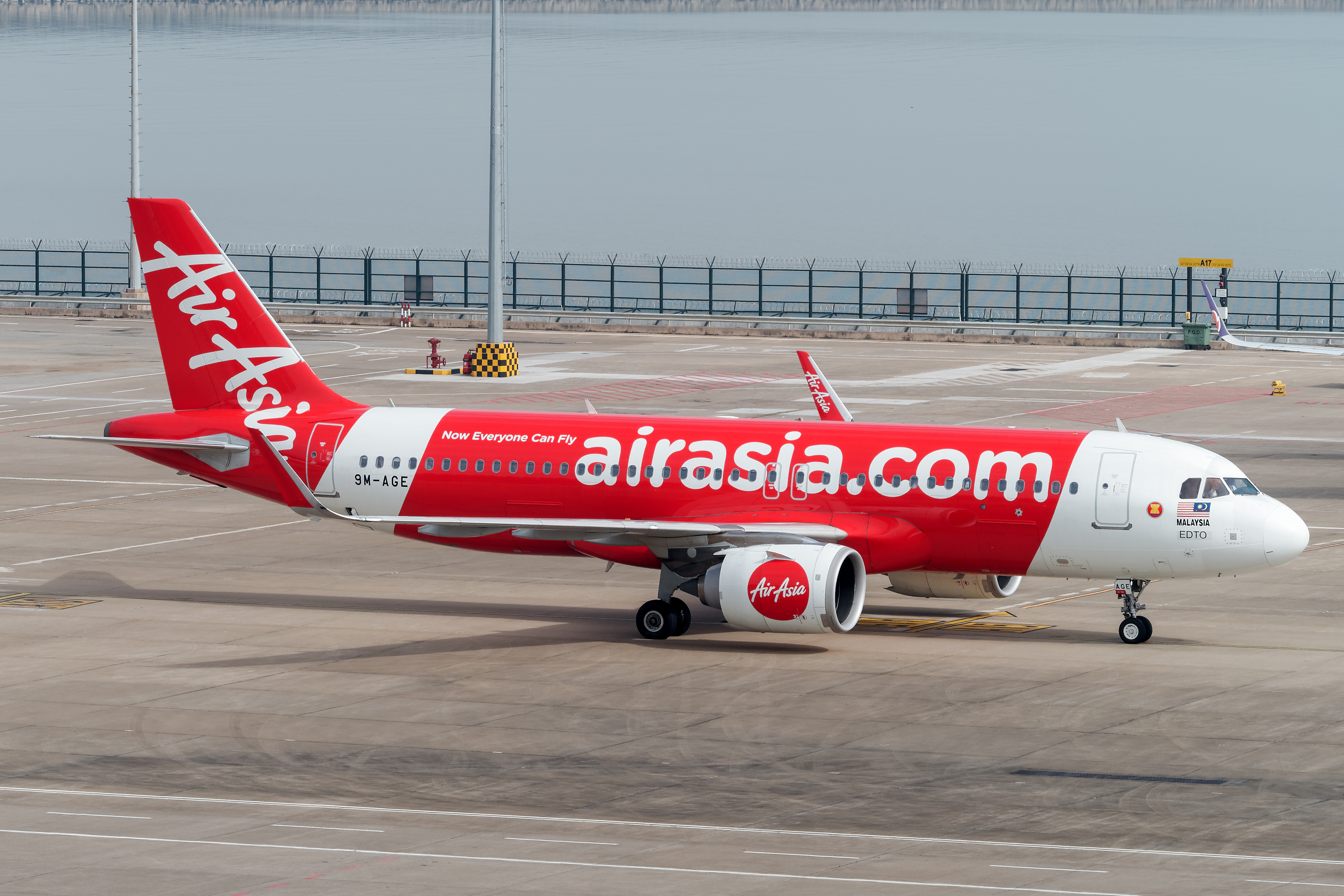
An Airbus A320neo featuring AirAsia's current livery, introduced in 2016.

Between 2013 and 2019, AirAsia continued its expansion strategy, both by launching new routes and growing its affiliate network. Notably, the airline established Philippines AirAsia and AirAsia Japan in 2012, followed by AirAsia India in 2014. Despite its focus on growth, AirAsia’s efforts to establish airlines in countries such as China, Myanmar, Sri Lanka, Singapore, South Korea and Vietnam were hindered by various challenges and practical constraints.

In 2014, AirAsia became the first Malaysian airline to offer onboard Wi-Fi services through its subsidiary, Tune Box. This innovation responded to the increasing demand for connectivity among travellers, reinforcing AirAsia's reputation as a leader in in-flight services.

By 2018, AirAsia introduced Teleport, a logistics venture under its digital division, to enhance its cargo and e-commerce capabilities. Teleport has since become a significant logistics provider, utilising AirAsia’s network to serve businesses and e-commerce platforms across Asia Pacific and beyond, including key hubs such as Hong Kong, Shanghai, Incheon, Narita, Bangalore and Sydney.

The airline was awarded the title of World's Best Low-Cost Airline by Skytrax for eleven consecutive years, from 2009 to 2019.

=== 2020–2023: Navigating the pandemic and recovery ===
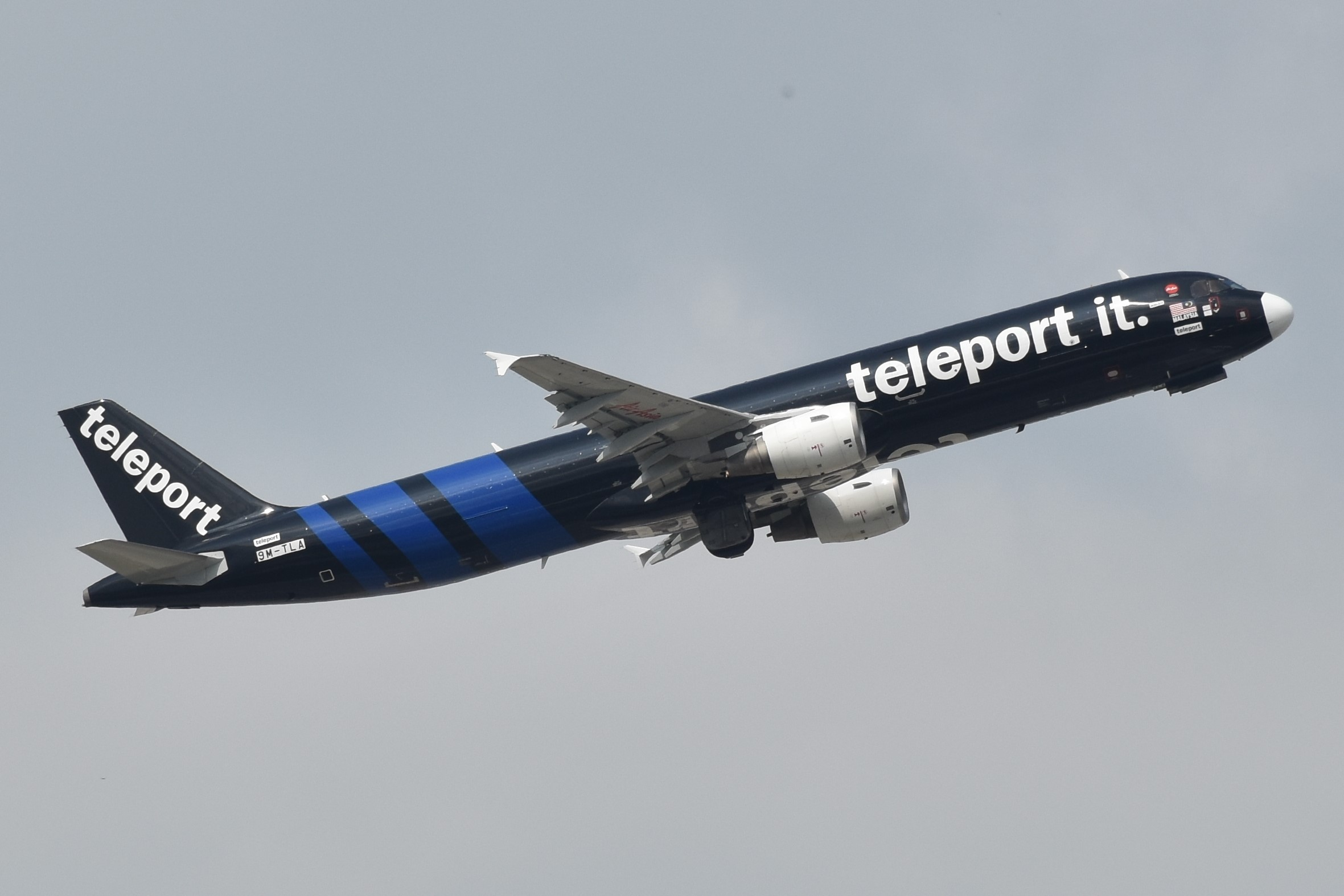
Teleport, established in 2018 as AirAsia's dedicated freight division

The COVID-19 pandemic had a significant impact on global aviation, including AirAsia. In March 2020, the airline suspended most of its flights due to travel restrictions, resulting in significant revenue losses. The airline grounded its fleet and implemented various cost-cutting measures, including layoffs and salary reductions for employees. AirAsia also focused on maintaining liquidity by securing loans and receiving government support.

In late 2020, the airline launched the Airasia Super App, diversifying its business model beyond air travel to include services such as food delivery, e-commerce and logistics. This move was aimed at adapting to changing consumer behaviors and maintaining a steady revenue stream in the face of reduced air travel.

As vaccination rates increased and travel restrictions began to ease in 2021, AirAsia gradually resumed its operations. The airline restarted domestic flights within Malaysia in April 2021, focusing initially on rebuilding its domestic network before reintroducing international routes. By late 2022, AirAsia began reinstating international routes, prioritising key markets within ASEAN and beyond. The airline targeted popular destinations in Thailand, Indonesia and India to restore its pre-pandemic network.

On 3 January 2022, AirAsia proposed its corporate name change to Capital A, which subject to shareholders' approval. The proposed name has been approved by the Companies Commission of Malaysia (SSM) and reserved by the company on 28 December 2021. On 28 January 2022, the company changed its corporate name from AirAsia Group Bhd to Capital A Bhd to reflect the expansion of its business portfolio beyond the core budget airline. However, its airline business continued to use the AirAsia brand.

AirAsia's recovery continued throughout 2022, as demand for travel rebounded. By the end of the year, the airline had carried approximately 9.95 million passengers. In 2023, AirAsia significantly increased its capacity, with a nine-fold increase in available seats compared to the previous year. This expansion was driven by the resumption of routes and the addition of new aircraft to its fleet. Additionally, the airline expanded its international network by reintroducing routes between Thailand and China.

=== 2024–present: Strategic reorganisation and global ambitions ===
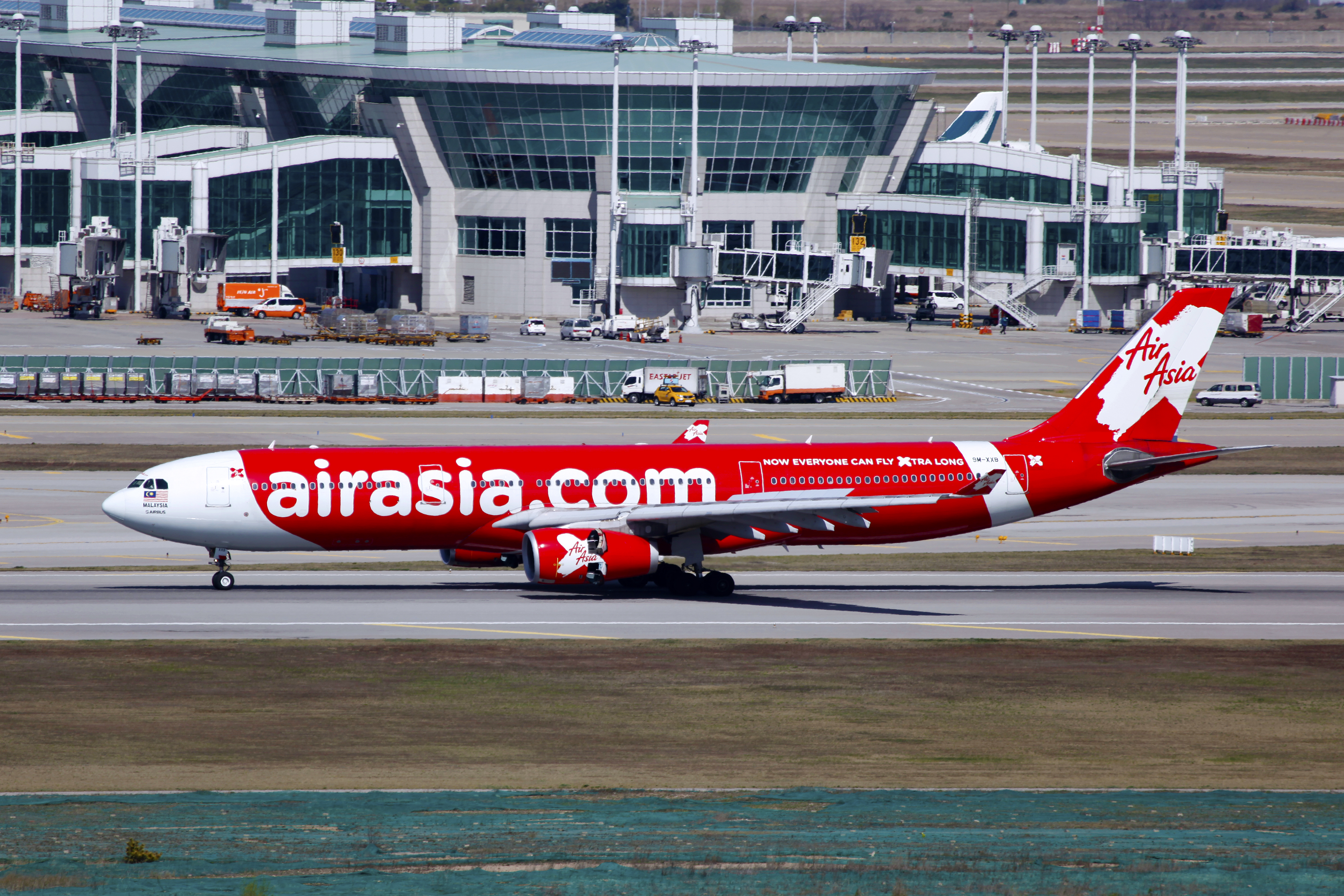
An AirAsia X Airbus A330 photographed at Seoul-Incheon International Airport. Following the completion of the merger between AirAsia and AirAsia X in July 2026, the AirAsia X brand was retired.

On 8 January 2024, AirAsia X signed a non-binding agreement with Capital A to fully acquire AirAsia Bhd and AirAsia Aviation Group Limited (AAAGL), which oversees AirAsia’s affiliates outside Malaysia. The plan involves merging AirAsia Malaysia, Indonesia AirAsia, Philippines AirAsia and AirAsia Cambodia under the AirAsia X brand. Initially, the creation of a new entity, AirAsia Group Berhad, was proposed, but by August 2024, the decision was made to directly acquire AirAsia and AAAGL instead. This acquisition is projected to provide access to over 200 aircraft and 361 future aircraft orders from Capital A's aviation portfolio, integrating narrow-body and wide-body aircraft into a unified fleet.

In March 2024, AirAsia launched its first flights to Perth in Australia using Airbus A321neo aircraft. By late 2024, AirAsia outlined plans to position Kuala Lumpur International Airport as a key global aviation hub. As part of this expansion strategy, the airline aimed to increase its fleet size from 79 to 92 aircraft by the end of 2024, while boosting daily flights from 230 to 258. Additionally, AirAsia plans to add eight new destinations to its network, bringing the total number of destinations to 106, up from 98.

Capital A, AirAsia's parent company, took significant steps to address its financial challenges after being classified under Practice Note 17 (PN17) by Bursa Malaysia, the Malaysian stock exchange, due to difficulties arising from the COVID-19 pandemic. PN17 requires companies facing financial distress to submit a recovery plan to remain publicly listed. In December 2024, Capital A submitted a regularisation plan that included reducing accumulated losses and transferring its aviation businesses to AirAsia X, with the aim of exiting PN17 by the first quarter of 2025 once all necessary approvals were obtained. The completion deadline was, however, extended several times, from the original January 25, 2025 date to March 25, May 31, July 31, August 31, September 30, and October 31, to allow additional time for securing the required approvals. On October 29, 2025, Capital A announced that all conditions for the share sale and purchase agreements (SSPAs) had been fulfilled or waived, enabling the consolidation of all AirAsia-branded airlines under AirAsia X and marking a key step toward the company’s exit from PN17 status.

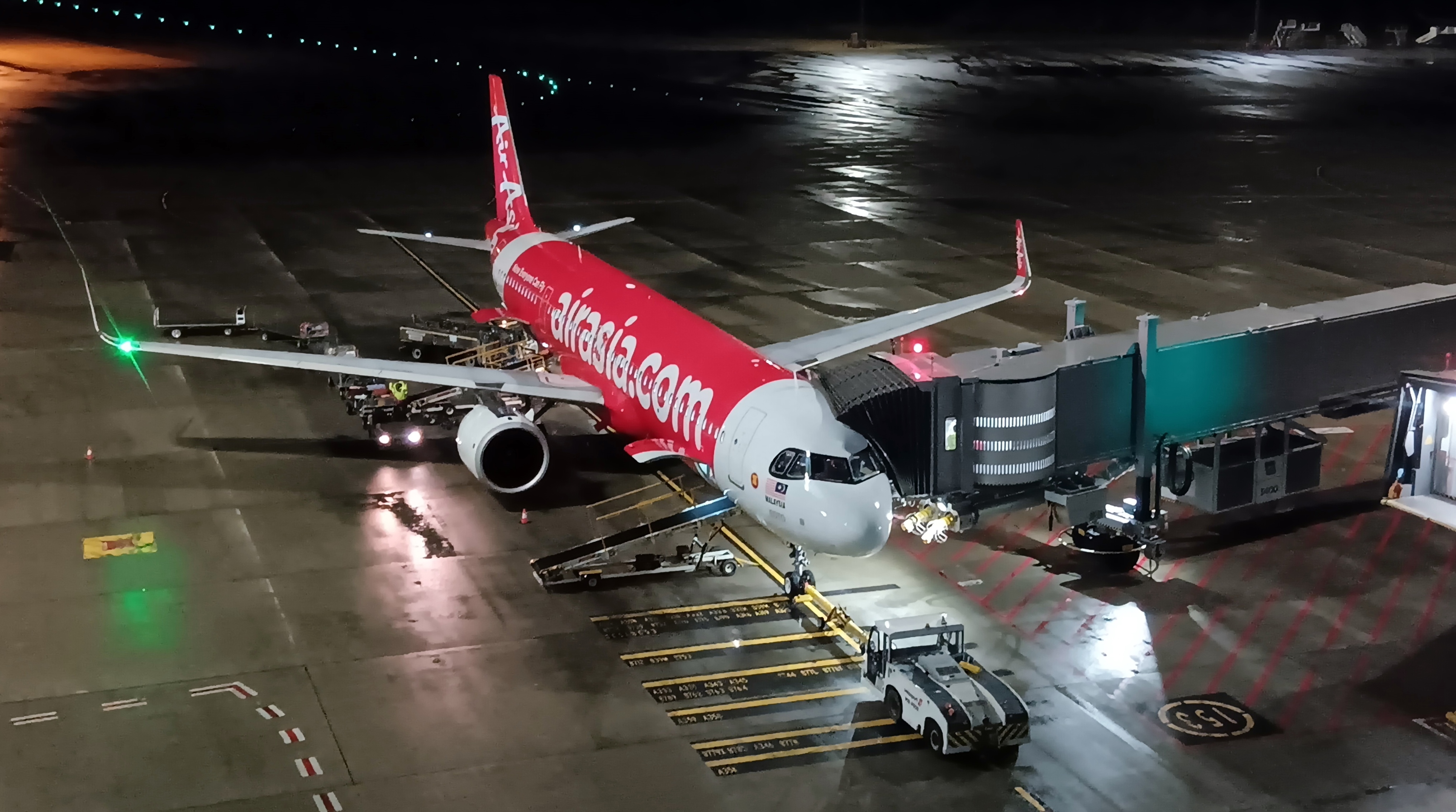
An AirAsia Airbus A321neo at Perth Airport, Western Australia

As part of its long-term growth strategy, AirAsia has outlined plans to expand its presence across additional ASEAN markets. This includes Vietnam, where the group is reportedly in discussions with local partners to establish a domestic operation despite several unsuccessful attempts over the past two decades. Preliminary discussions have also been reported regarding the establishment of local affiliates in Laos, Brunei and Myanmar, which would extend the group’s operational footprint across nearly all ASEAN countries.

Beyond Southeast Asia, AirAsia is pursuing expansion into the Middle East through the development of a new regional hub. In December 2025, Capital A signed a Letter of Intent with Bahrain’s Ministry of Transport and Telecommunications to explore the establishment of a hub in the country, which would connect Southeast Asia with Europe, Africa, and the Middle East, supporting both passenger and cargo operations. The airline is reportedly targeting up to 25 daily flights from Bahrain by 2030 and plans to apply for an operating licence to support the proposed expansion.

This initiative aligns with AirAsia’s July 2025 agreement with Airbus to acquire 50 Airbus A321XLR aircraft, with options to convert an additional 20 in the future. These extra-long-range narrowbody jets offer improved fuel efficiency and extended range compared to the A321neo, enabling the airline to operate low-cost services to Europe via one-stop connections through the Middle East, and to the United States with two-stop routes.

On 6 May 2026, AirAsia Group announced an order for 150 Airbus A220-300 aircraft at Airbus’ Mirabel facility in Canada, becoming a new customer for the type and launch customer for a new 160-seat configuration of the aircraft. The agreement also included flexibility for future orders of the proposed A220-500 variant. Deliveries are scheduled to begin in 2028, with the aircraft intended to support expansion across ASEAN and the Asia-Pacific region while complementing AirAsia’s existing narrow-body fleet and gradually replacing older Airbus A320 aircraft. The order followed earlier discussions in 2024 regarding the acquisition of smaller regional aircraft from Airbus, Comac and Embraer to support the airline’s operational growth. By 2035, AirAsia aims to operate a fleet of more than 600 aircraft and carry between 155 and 175 million passengers annually, serving up to 175 destinations.

== Destinations ==
AirAsia has rapidly expanded its domestic and international network since its rebranding as a low-cost carrier in 2001. The airline's primary hub is located at Kuala Lumpur International Airport (KLIA), where it operates a substantial portion of its flights. AirAsia operates a broad domestic network within Malaysia, connecting numerous cities and regional hubs across the country. Key destinations include major cities like Kuala Lumpur, Penang, Kota Kinabalu and Kuching.

Internationally, AirAsia operates numerous routes across Southeast Asia and beyond, offering destinations in countries such as Thailand, Indonesia, the Philippines, Singapore and mainland China. The airline has also expanded into other regions, including India and Australia. This broad network has enabled AirAsia to become a significant player in the regional and international aviation markets, catering to both business and leisure travellers.

In addition to its primary operations at KLIA’s low-cost terminal, AirAsia (Malaysia) has developed secondary hubs to enhance regional connectivity. These hubs include Penang International Airport which acts as a gateway in northern Peninsular Malaysia, Kota Kinabalu International Airport and Kuching International Airport facilitating travel in Malaysian Borneo and Senai International Airport in Johor Bahru, which serves the southern region of Peninsular Malaysia and provides convenient access to and from Singapore. Together, these hubs play a vital role in supporting AirAsia’s extensive network, ensuring that the airline can efficiently serve its domestic and international markets.

=== Codeshare agreements ===
- Pegasus Airlines

=== Interline agreements ===
- Citilink

== Fleet ==
=== Current fleet ===
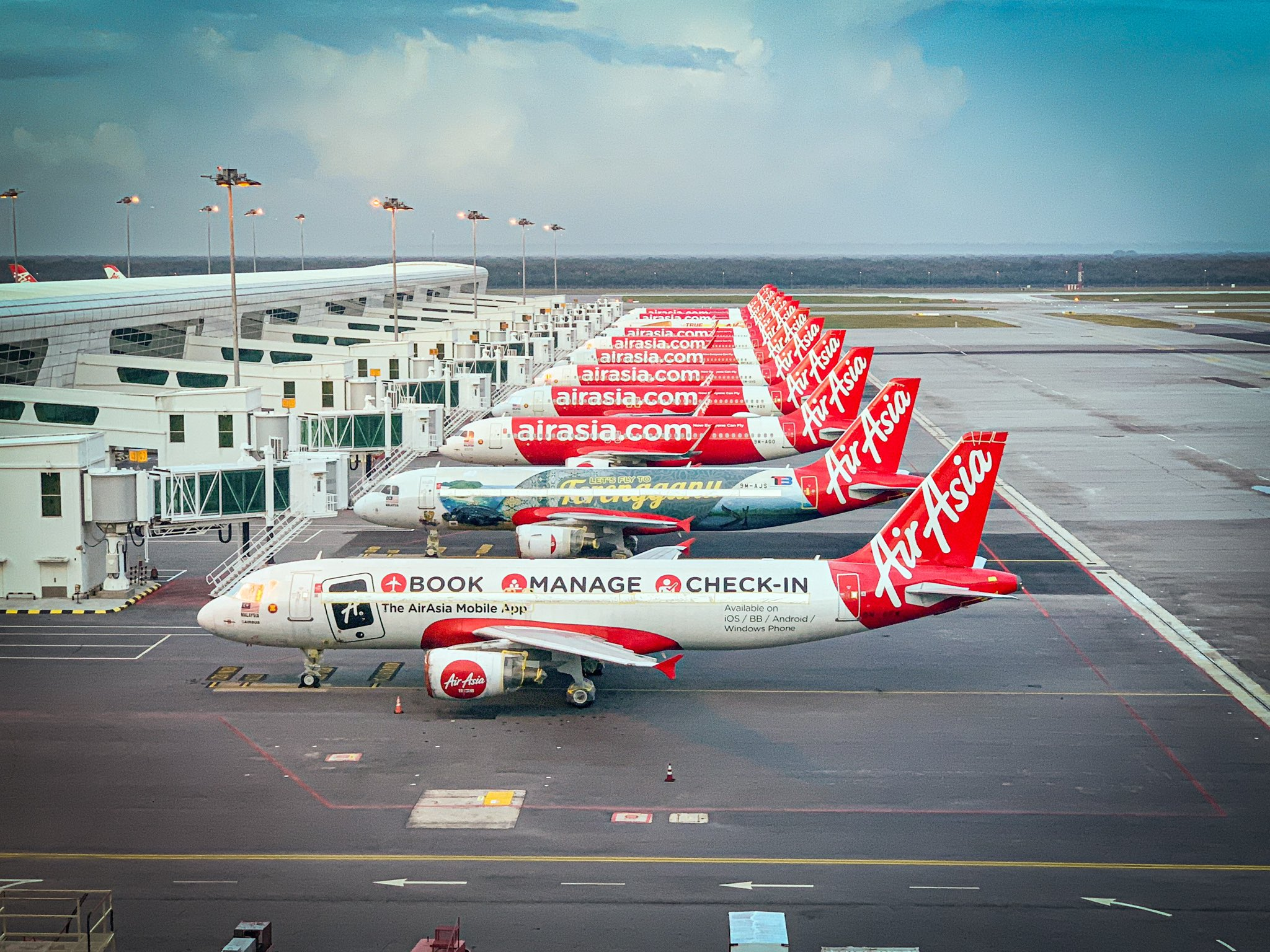
A lineup of AirAsia Airbus A320s at KLIA Terminal 2

As of July 2026, AirAsia operates an all-Airbus fleet comprising the following aircraft:

AirAsia fleet
Aircraft	In service	Orders	Passengers	Notes
Airbus A220-300	—	150	160	Deliveries from 2028. Order with 150 Options.
Airbus A320-200	70	—	180	4 aircraft taken over from MYAirline
Airbus A320-200	70	—	186	4 aircraft taken over from MYAirline
Airbus A320neo	29	—	186	
Airbus A321neo	8	239	236	
Airbus A321LR	1	61	236	Delivery will commence in 2026. 9M-XVC was the first unit.
Airbus A321XLR	—	50	TBA	20 on option.
Teleport fleet
Airbus A321-200/P2F	3	—	Cargo	9M-TLA, 9M-TLB and 9M-TLP
Total	111	500		

=== Fleet renewal and development ===
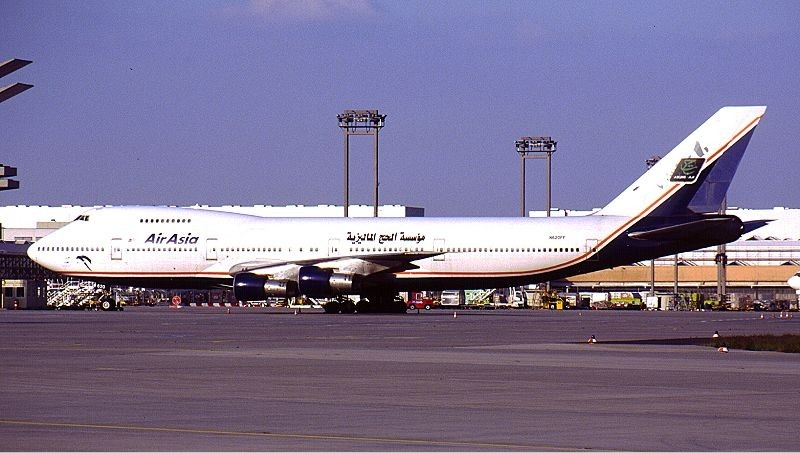
An AirAsia Boeing 747-200 (N620FF) in a hybrid AirAsia-Tabung Haji livery leased from Tower Air for charter operations during the Hajj season in 2000

Previously operating the Boeing 737-300, AirAsia has now completely converted to the Airbus A320 family.

In June 2011, AirAsia ordered 200 Airbus A320neos at the Paris Air Show. The planes were originally due to become available in 2015, and the deal was one of the largest ever for commercial aircraft in a single order. The deal was worth US$18 billion at list prices, although AirAsia will have obtained a substantial discount from those prices. The deal makes AirAsia Airbus' single biggest customer. On 13 December 2012, AirAsia placed an order for an additional 100 Airbus A320 jets, splitting it between 64 A320neo and 36 A320ceo.

At the Farnborough International Airshow in 2016, AirAsia ordered 100 A321neos at an estimated cost of US$12.6 billion at list prices. AirAsia planned to fly these larger aircraft to airports that had infrastructure constraints. AirAsia received its first A320neo in September 2016.

At the 2019 Farnborough Airshow, AirAsia further increased its orders for A320 aircraft, in the process also becoming Airbus' largest customer for the A321neo variant. With this order, the total number of orders that AirAsia had placed for the Airbus A320 family climbed to 592, reaffirming the carrier's position also as the largest airline customer for the Airbus single aisle product line. However, as a consequence of the COVID-19 pandemic on aviation, the orders for the new A320 family of aircraft were reworked by mutual agreement between AirAsia and Airbus in October 2021, with deliveries now scheduled to extend to 2035, among other undisclosed changes in purchase terms.

On 7 May 2026, at a joint press conference in Montreal, AirAsia ordered 150 A220-300, the single biggest order of the type. The company will be the launch customer of the increased 160 seat capacity, achievable by an additional over wing exit on each side.

=== Former fleet ===
As of August 2025, AirAsia operated 69 Airbus A320, 29 Airbus A320neo, 9 Airbus A321neo and 3 Airbus A321P2F.

== Services ==
=== On board ===
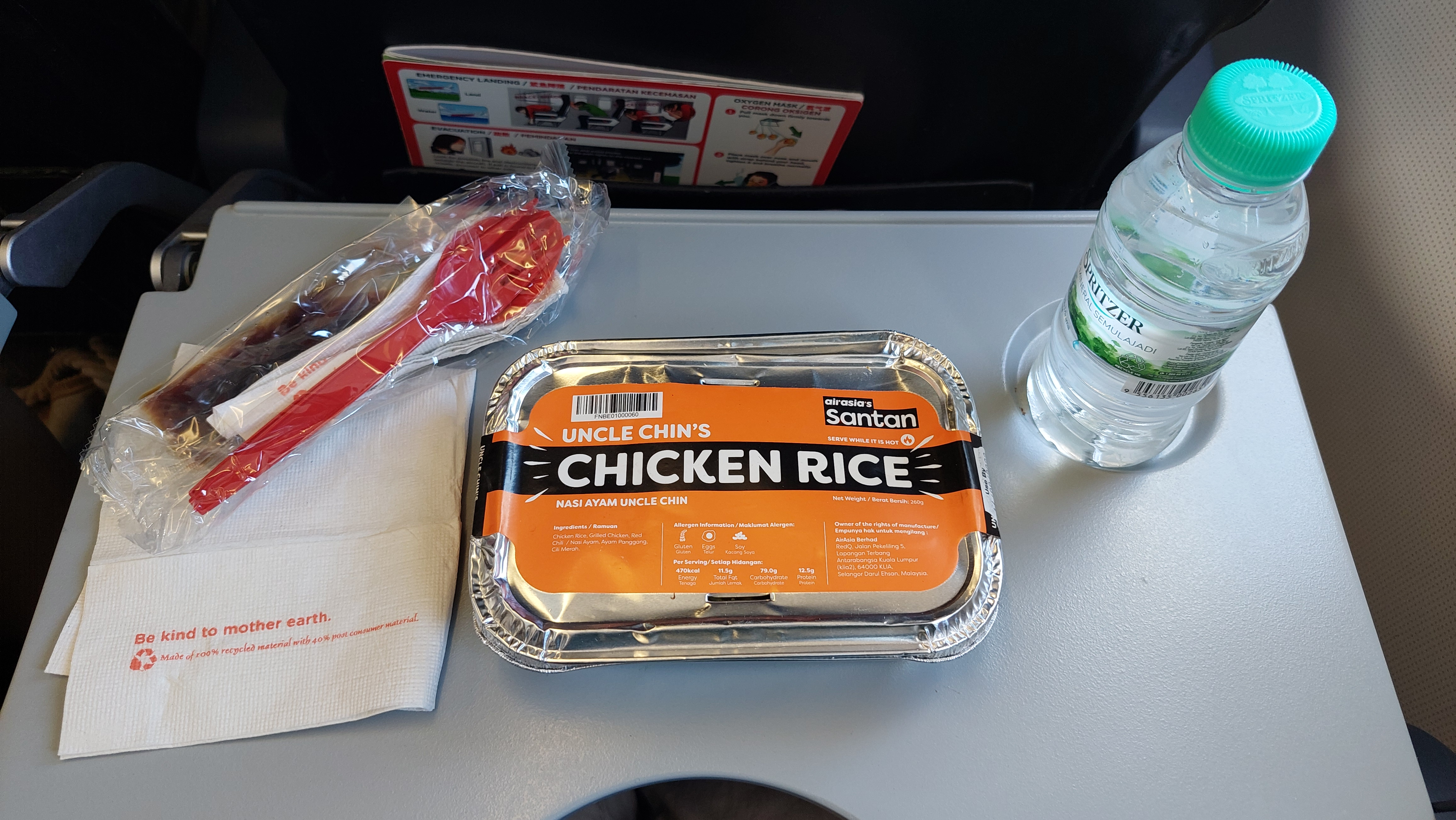
Chicken rice meal served on a flight from Malaysia to Singapore.

AirAsia offers "Santan" menu, with options to buy on board offering food, drinks, merchandise and duty free for purchase. Pre-purchase of "Santan" meals is available at a lower price than on board, and with additional options AirAsia is accredited by the KL Syariah Index of Bursa Malaysia, and in accordance with Shariah principles, it does not serve alcohol or pork. However, this applies only to the regional AirAsia group flights, and not to the AirAsia X flights, which do sell wine and beer on board.

=== Frequent-flyer program ===
AirAsia has launched a programme called "AirAsia rewards", formerly known as "BIG". Under this programme, it will issue loyalty points to AirAsia customers and third-party merchants. Points can then be used to redeem AirAsia flights.

== Corporate affairs ==
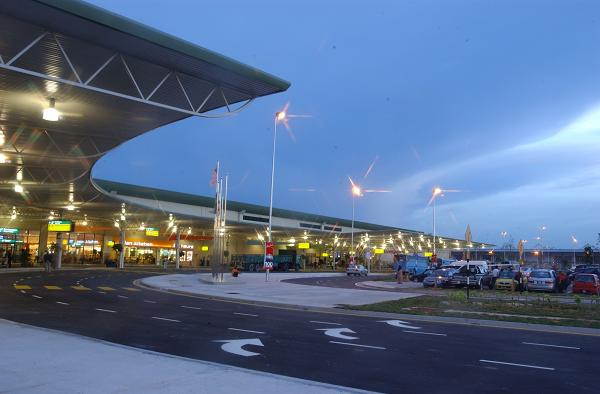
The former KLIA LCCT (converted into a cargo terminal after the completion of KLIA Terminal 2) housed the AirAsia head office until the opening of RedQuarters.

The head office is the Red Quarters (RedQ) at Kuala Lumpur International Airport in Sepang, Selangor. This facility also serves as the company's registered office.

The airline has moved its head office to a new 56,985.1 m^{2} (613,383 sq ft), RM140mil facility constructed at klia2 (renamed as KLIA Terminal 2 in June 2023) on 7 November 2016. Until the new head office opened, the airline's head office was located in the KLIA LCCT. The new klia2 head office has been scheduled to open at the end of 2015. The former registered office was on level 13 of the Menara Prima Tower B in Petaling Jaya.

RedQ is scheduled to hold about 2,000 AirAsia and AirAsia X employees. Aireen Omar, the AirAsia Country CEO of Malaysia, stated that the headquarters needed to be redesigned because in the klia2 plans the location of the control tower had been changed. Construction on the facility was scheduled to begin in July 2014. Malaysia Airports Holdings is leasing the land that will be occupied by the headquarters. January Ann Baysa, an AirAsia X flight attendant from the Philippines, gave the building the name "RedQuarters" or "RedQ".

=== Business highlights ===
AirAsia Group/Capital A business highlights
Financial performance (RM million)								Operating highlights (group)					
Fiscal year	Revenue	Expenses	Operating income	Net income	Assets	Liabilities	Equity	Pax	Available seats	Load factor (%)	RPK (million)	ASK (million)	Fleet size
2008	2,855	3,207	−352	−496	9,406	7,800	1,606	11,808,058	15,744,077	75.00	14,439	16,890	65
2009	3,133	2,220	913	506	11,398	8,777	2,621	14,253,244	19,004,325	75.00	16,890	22,159	84
2010	3,948	2,881	1,067	1,061	13,240	9,599	3,641	25,680,609	33,058,197	77.45	29,612	38,704	90
2011	4,495	3,332	1,163	555	13,906	9,870	4,036	29,975,005	37,505,692	79.81	35,090	43,940	97
2012	4,946	3,917	1,029	790	15,729	10,869	4,860	34,137,594	42,974,280	73.83	38,699	48,581	118
2013	5,112	4,249	863	362	17,856	12,855	5,001	42,431,075	53,777,570	75.59	47,880	60,261	154
2014	5,416	4,590	826	83	20,664	16,109	4,555	45,578,458	58,185,900	77.41	52,183	66,625	172
2015	6,298	4,702	1,596	541	21,316	16,865	4,451	50,258,794	62,809,426	79.46	58,479	73,209	171
2016	6,846	4,735	2,111	1,619	21,986	15,358	6,628	54,778,693	63,826,307	85.61	65,971	77,266	174
2017	9,710	7,549	2,161	1,571	21,674	14,964	6,710	63,385,096	72,283,184	83.75	74,986	85,961	205
2018	10,638	9,419	1,219	1,695	18,550	12,365	6,185	72,907,649	86,089,380	81.98	84,490	101,446	226
2019	11,860	11,136	725	−283	25,595	22,684	2,911	83,107,856	97,585,626	80.18	96,245	112,995	246
2020	3,274	8,697	−5,422	−5,888	19,866	23,436	−3,570	22,800,877	30,584,954	74.76	21,642	29,296	247
2021	1,836	4,682	−2,846	−3,721	20,030	26,453	−6,423	7,740,504	10,808,358	71.78	6,231	8,724	213
2022	6,437	7,831	−1,394	−3,304	19,928	29,445	−9,517	34,197,289	40,833,504	83.72	33,005	39,773	209
2023	14,693	14,547	145	−96	28,455	39,080	−10,625	49,250,326	55,907,707	88.09	57,389	66,164	216

Notes

- Data before 2008 were excluded from the table as figures from 2000 to 2007 were compounded using a different fiscal year period.
- The financial highlights table only includes figures from the Capital A Consolidated Airlines Group consisting of its main affiliate in Malaysia, and sub-affiliates Indonesia AirAsia and Philippines AirAsia.

== Affiliate airlines ==
=== Current ===
==== AirAsia Cambodia ====
In May 2017, AirAsia planned to open a subsidiary company in Cambodia to handle an increase of tourists from Malaysia visiting to the Cambodian cities of Phnom Penh, Siem Reap and Sihanoukville. On 9 December 2022, AirAsia and Sivilai Asia signed a joint venture agreement to establish AirAsia Cambodia, with AirAsia owning majority of the airline. The airline commenced operations on 2 May 2024.

==== AirAsia X ====
AirAsia X is the long-haul operation of AirAsia. The franchise is able to keep costs down by using a universal ticketing system. AirAsia X is also affiliated with Virgin Group and Air Canada. On 17 May 2007, Tony Fernandes announced plans to commence flights from Malaysia to Australia. Fernandes said he would be avoiding Sydney Airport due to its high fees. Instead, the airline would concentrate on cheaper alternatives such as Melbourne's Avalon Airport, Newcastle and Adelaide Airport. Sustained fares were predicted to be around MYR 800 (A$285) for a return fare, plus taxes. Interest was also expressed in using Gold Coast Airport as another Australian destination. AirAsia X began operations on 2 November 2007, with its first flight from Kuala Lumpur to Gold Coast.

==== Indonesia AirAsia ====
Indonesia AirAsia serves as the Indonesian affiliate of AirAsia, It operates scheduled domestic and international flights from Indonesia, with its main base at Soekarno-Hatta International Airport, Jakarta. The airline was established as Awair in 1999 by 4th President of Indonesia Abdurrahman Wahid, of which he had a 40% stake in that he relinquished upon his election. On 1 December 2005, Awair changed its name to Indonesia AirAsia in line with the other AirAsia branded airlines in the region. AirAsia Berhad has a 49% share in the airline with Fersindo Nusaperkasa owning 51%. Indonesia's laws disallow a foreign-majority ownership on domestic civil aviation operations.

==== Philippines AirAsia ====
Philippines AirAsia is a joint venture between Filipino investors and AirAsia. The Filipino group include Antonio Cojuangco, Jr., Yancy Mckhel Mejia, former owner of Associated Broadcasting Company with flagship television station TV5, Michael Romero, a real estate developer and port operator, and Marianne Hontiveros. The airline is 60% owned by the Filipino investors and the remaining 40% is owned by AirAsia. The airline was launched on 16 December 2010 and commenced operations on 28 March 2012.

In 2013, it partnered with Zest Airways, a Philippine low-cost airline. It operates scheduled domestic and international tourist services, mainly feeder services linking Manila and Cebu with 24 domestic destinations in support of the trunk route operations of other airlines. Less than a year after AirAsia and Zest Air's strategic alliance, Zest Airways was rebranded as AirAsia Zest on 21 September 2013. It merged with Philippines AirAsia in 2015.

==== Thai AirAsia & Thai AirAsia X ====
Thai AirAsia is a joint venture between AirAsia and Thailand's Asia Aviation. It serves AirAsia's regularly scheduled domestic and international flights from Bangkok and other cities in Thailand. Prior to 2016, Thai AirAsia was 55% owned by Asia Aviation and 45% owned by AirAsia International. King Power acquired 39% of Asia Aviation in 2016. The airline sponsors the Thai football teams Buriram United, Muangthong United, Chonburi, Osotspa Saraburi, BEC Tero Sasana, Chiangrai United, Esan United, Chainat Hornbill, Customs United, Bangkok United, Phuket Andaman, Krabi, Air Force United, Nakhon Phanom, Loei City, Trang and the referee of Football Association of Thailand.

Thai AirAsia X is Thailand's first long-haul low-cost airline. It was scheduled to begin operations in June 2014. After putting off the launch that had been planned for the first quarter, Thai AirAsia X was to launch its maiden service from Bangkok to Incheon, South Korea on 17 June and then begin regular flights to Japan's Narita Airport in Tokyo and Osaka around July.

In May 2022, AirAsia announced the introduction of its ride-hailing service in Thailand, AirAsia Ride. Thailand is the second country AirAsia is expanding the e-hailing services in, directly competing with the dominant player, Grab.

=== Defunct ===
==== AirAsia India ====
AirAsia India was the Indian affiliate of AirAsia. The airline was announced as a joint venture between AirAsia, Arun Bhatia, and Tata Sons on 19 February 2013. It commenced operations on 12 June 2014. The airline is headquartered in Chennai, with its primary hub at Kempegowda International Airport, Bangalore.

In November 2020, AirAsia reviewing its India operations run in partnership with Tata Sons signalling a possible exit from the country. The airline was later sold to Tata Sons in 2022, making it a wholly owned subsidiary of Air India Limited. The airline merged with Air India Express in 2023.

==== AirAsia Japan ====
AirAsia Japan was the Japanese low-cost airline affiliate of AirAsia based in Nagoya and formerly in Narita. The airline was first announced as a joint venture between AirAsia and All Nippon Airways in 2011. It flew its first flight in August 2012. The joint venture was terminated in June 2013, which led to the airline ceasing operations on 27 October 2013.

A relaunch of AirAsia Japan was announced in 2014. It recommenced operations on 29 October 2017, but due to low passenger demand caused by COVID-19 pandemic, it ceased operations on 5 October 2020.

==== Indonesia AirAsia X ====
Indonesia AirAsia X was a joint venture of AirAsia X. It served Indonesia AirAsia's regularly scheduled long haul international flights from Bali's Ngurah Rai International Airport. Indonesia AirAsia X launched its first flight to Taipei on 29 January 2015. It ceased scheduled operations in January 2019.

== Awards and recognitions ==
- Skytrax
  - World's Best Low-Cost Airline (2009–present)
- World Travel Awards
  - World's Leading Low-Cost Airline (2013–present)
  - World's Leading Low-Cost Airline Cabin Crew (2017–present)
  - Asia's Leading Low-Cost Airline (2016–present)

== Criticism and controversy ==
=== Barisan Nasional-themed flight ===
Before the 2018 Malaysian general election, AirAsia received criticism for seemingly backing Najib Razak and his Barisan Nasional coalition, a move seen as politically incorrect by some political commentators. Najib was seen returning from Sabah to Kuala Lumpur after a campaign trip on an AirAsia flight together with AirAsia CEO Tony Fernandes. The aeroplane that Najib flew was draped in the blue of BN with the air stewardesses dressed in that same blue, instead of the typical AirAsia red. The words Hebatkan Negaraku (Malay for 'make my country greater') can also be seen across the fuselage of the aeroplane. After Najib was defeated in the general election, Tony Fernandes issued an apology, claiming that he had buckled under the intense pressure from Najib's government.

=== Other controversies and issues ===
In 2007, passengers from "The Barrier-Free Environment and Accessible Transport Group" protested against the airline over its refusal to fly passengers who were completely immobile. They claimed that people with disabilities were discriminated against when booking tickets online; the CEO of the airline said it did not turn away passengers in wheelchairs.

On 27 June 2025, AirAsia's digital platform MOVE was fined ₱6 million (around US$106,000) by the Civil Aeronautics Board in the Philippines, after the Department of Transportation (DOTr) found that its fares were overpriced. The investigation started when the DOTr received a complaint from Richard Gomez and Lucy Torres-Gomez, who used the platform to buy Philippine Airlines flights from Tacloban to Manila, which cost them ₱77,704. AirAsia said that this was because of “temporary data synchronization issues with flight pricing partners.”

== See also ==
- List of airlines of Malaysia
- List of airports in Malaysia
- Transport in Malaysia
