= Tune Ventures =

Malaysian company

- Type: Private investment company
- Headquarters: Malaysia

Tune Ventures Sdn. Bhd is a private investment company based in Malaysia. It is 40% owned by Tony Fernandes, 30% by Kamarudin Meranun, 25% by Dennis Melka and 5% by Tune Strategic Investments Limited. Multiple companies are majority owned by Tune Ventures, most of which use the Tune brand to market their products. These companies also form part of the Tune Group of companies.

== Related Companies ==
These are the companies that are partially owned by Tune Ventures or are related to Tune Ventures:

- Tune Hotels – 72.19% stake
- Tune Money – 44.88% stake
- Tune Talk – 35.7% stake
- AirAsia
- AirAsia X
- Upland Resources
