= List of The Apprentice Asia episodes =

The following is a list of episodes in the Asian television show The Apprentice Asia.

== Episodes ==
=== Original Series ===
==== Episode 1 ====
- Episode title: Get Ready for Sharp Suits and Even Sharper Claws
- Air date: 22 May 2013
- Task: Sell fish at a wet market for the highest profit
- Project managers
  - Mavericks: Hendy
  - Apex: Nik
- Dramatic tension: On Team Apex, Nik mislabeled a tray of prawns that was RM47 per kilogram at cost price as RM15 per kilogram. They thus incurred a loss of RM300 on that tray of prawns alone. Team Mavericks began to sell their fish before the stall was properly set up.
- Winning team: Apex
  - Reasons for win: Both teams failed to make any profit and incurred losses instead. However, the women were able to minimise their loss by making large sales to restaurants at good margins to clear their remaining stock. They attained a loss of RM186 which was less than the men's loss of RM654.
  - Reward: A private dinner at Chynna, Hilton Kuala Lumpur.
- Losing Team: Mavericks
  - Reasons for loss: Hanzo and Alex began channeling customers to their stall even though prices were not demarcated by the rest of the team yet. Hendy and Samuel proceeded to sell fish to customers without prices established. The team also sold leftover fish at near-giveaway prices to nearby restaurants further worsening their loss.
- Sent to boardroom: Hendy, Alex and Nazril
- Fired: Hendy Setiono - for his inability to lead his team "in moments of crisis", lacking any form of strategy going into the task and allowing the team to be had by crafty housewives seeking the best bargain possible. He also brought Alex and Nazril - two strong team members - into the boardroom and refused to name any weak members in the team, namely Hanzo and Samuel. When explaining his reasons, Fernandes realized that Hendy wanted to resign (or be fired) and let him go.
- Notes:
  - Fernandes was especially displeased as both teams made a loss. However, as Apex made a smaller loss, they were declared the winners of the task.

==== Episode 2 ====
- Episode title: Hollywood Dreams, Lots of Sukling, and a Boardroom Battle. Meow.
- Air date: 29 May 2013
- Task: Create a 30-sec viral video to promote Expedia.
- Project managers:
  - Mavericks: Samuel
  - Apex: Dussadee
- Winning team: Apex
  - Reasons for win: The team understood the concept of a viral video. They produced a video with a catchy dance that was easily replicable.
  - Reward: Martini at the Marini's On 57 bar on the 57th floor of the Petronas Towers
- Losing team: Mavericks
  - Reasons for loss: The team failed to create a video with a talking point, instead producing a clip that resembled a television commercial. In addition, Jonathan failed to ask proper questions during the meeting with the Expedia executive, instead focusing on business and marketing strategies which was irrelevant to the task.
- Sent to boardroom: Samuel, Jonathan and Hanzo
  - Boardroom tension: Samuel accused Hanzo of shooting down a video idea involving Richard Branson's lost bet against Fernandes, in which Branson had to cross-dress as an air stewardess on an AirAsia flight. Fernandes felt that it was a "dumb move" as that idea could have made the difference between a win and a loss. However, he reserved some criticism for Jonathan and Samuel as well, commenting that "all three should be fired".
- Fired: Hanzo Ng Kian Tat - for his inability to co-operate with his team, as well as a general lack of engagement in the task.

==== Episode 3 ====
- Episode Title: The Hand, the Clueless Local, and the Shocking Twist
- Air date: 5 June 2013
- Task: Make a sales pitch for 3 Taiwanese products (from a choice of 6) to large retailers (Giant Hypermarket and Sogo) and small retailers. The team with the highest sales revenue wins.
  - The choice of products were done by alternate selection, with Apex winning the coin toss and the right to choose first. Apex chose the wireless IP camera, portable battery charger and portable bicycle and Mavericks chose the rice cooker, video projector and portable bicycle (a different model)
  - Corporate restructuring: Since Mavericks lost the previous two tasks, Andrea was instructed by Fernandes to join Mavericks in order to even out the teams.
- Project managers:
  - Mavericks: Andrea
  - Apex: Celina
- Winning team: Mavericks
  - Reasons for win: Although they did not make any sales to Giant due to poor pricing strategy, they came back with a large sale to Sogo. Also, the team made a decent amount of sales to small retailers because the large retailers sales pitch team decided to help sell to small retailers after they found out that Samuel and Nazril did not make many sales. They made a total of RM1,172,938.
  - Reward: Shopping spree at La Martina with RM7,500 to spend among the team.
- Losing team: Apex
  - Reasons for loss: Although they made good sales to Giant, the products did not cater to the market that Sogo was targeting. In addition, they made poor sales to the small retailers because Ningku's hard-sell techniques put off potential buyers and Nik did not plan the route well to maximise the number of retailers they could meet. They made RM1,083,862 of sales in total.
- Sent to boardroom: Celina, Nik and Ningku
- Quit: Dussadee Oeawpanich "Dee" - as she felt that the cut-throat and ultra-competitive team dynamics did not suit her style of working, with team members being disrespectful to one another. While Fernandes was shocked at her decision, he eventually respected her decision and allowed her to leave. As such, no one was fired that week.
- Notes:
  - Fernandes chose the project managers this week, instead of the team deciding for themselves.
  - The first time that Team Apex lose, breaking their two weeks winning streak.
  - Although Dussadee announced her intention to resign before the final boardroom (but after Celina chose whom to bring back to the boardroom), Fernandes still conducted the final boardroom before announcing that none would be fired.

==== Episode 4 ====
- Episode title: Coffee Can Be A Challenge
- Air date: 12 June 2013
- Task: Promote the Nescafé Dolce Gusto with a pop-up café. The winner would be judged by Nestlé executives.
- Project managers:
  - Mavericks: Alex
  - Apex: Ningku
- Dramatic tension: Apex chose the ice cappuccino flavour to be placed on the poster, which was not available at the retail outlet and only on the online store. Mavericks bought Ferrero Rocher chocolate to display, only to be pointed out by the Nestlé executives that the chocolate brand belonged to their competitor.
- Winning team: Mavericks
  - Reasons for win: The team correctly identified the target market for the product to be premium consumers. In addition, the sales team had adequate product knowledge and engaged customers well.
  - Reward: A spa trip
- Losing team: Apex
  - Reasons for loss: Although the team had a good tagline "Coffee can be an escape", they failed to make a good poster, showing only a single flavour (which was not even available at the retail outlet) and only one model of the machine when there were two available. Also, Ningku sent Nik and herself to distribute flyers, leaving the team short-handed at the pop-up café. Furthermore, Dian showed her poor product knowledge, when she mistakenly mentioned that the Genio model of the machine was manually operated, which it was actually automatic, upsetting the Nestlé executives.
- Sent to boardroom: Ningku, Dian and Celina
  - Boardroom tension: Ningku initially accepted responsibility for the task and asked to leave. However, Fernandes rejected her request (as opposed to the previous week, when Dussadee was allowed to quit). This would have made little difference anyway, since she was fired.
- Fired: Ningku Lachungpa - for poor leadership as a project manager, and for showing weakness by asking to quit the show. She had also tried to defend herself by emphasising on Dian's poor product knowledge which Fernandes felt was "pathetic".
- Notes:
  - This is a second week in a row that someone asked to resign. Should Fernandes had approved the request, it would be an Apprentice first whereby two competitors requested to leave the show in a row.

==== Episode 5 ====
- Episode title: One Befuddled Nash; One Distrusted Sam; And Winners and Losers
- Air date: 19 June 2013
- Task: Make the biggest profit while trading contract for difference (CFD) products on the IG platform, starting with USD20,000 of virtual money.
  - Corporate restructuring: Since Team Apex lost the task twice, Samuel and Alexis were asked to join Apex, but Dian was also asked to join Mavericks. This made the even out number of the teams.
- Project managers:
  - Mavericks: Nazril
  - Apex: Samuel
- Winning team: Mavericks
  - Reasons for win: The team adopted a conservative strategy, opening only 1 position at the start. They made a loss of $3,628.
  - Reward: Dinner with IG's Head of the Asia Pacific region Tamas Szabo and Tony Fernandes at the Fukuya restaurant.
- Losing team: Apex
  - Reasons for loss: The team adopted an aggressive strategy at the start that failed to pay off, despite huge gains on the second day. They incurred a loss of $7,759.
- Sent to boardroom: Samuel, Nik and Alexis
- Fired: Nik Aisyah Amirah Binti Mansor - for failing to step up in this task given her financial background as an auditor, for making a major miscalculation, and for being the weakest member as a whole among the three.
- Notes:
  - Fernandes was not around to assign the task this week. Mark Lankester did the corporate restructuring and Fernandes announced the task via a video recording.
  - Similar to the first task, both teams made losses, and Mavericks won by virtue of making a smaller loss. Nevertheless, Fernandes was displeased, stating that he "dislikes losses".
  - Footage from this episode was later seen in an IG commercial.

==== Episode 6 ====
- Episode title: Tony. Loses. It.
- Air date: 26 June 2013
- Task: Manage part of the Hilton Kuala Lumpur for the day. The winner would be judged by Hilton executives based on the quality of service.
- Project managers:
  - Mavericks: Jonathan
  - Apex: Celina
- Dramatic tension: Celina micro-managed Apex, calling Alexis every 2 minutes to check on their progress. This annoyed Samuel and Alexis as they were trying to focus on completing room service orders, and they eventually ignored Celina's calls.
- Winning team: Apex
  - Reasons for win: Despite a few minor hiccups with slow check-ins, the team provided service that most closely met Hilton's high standards of service. The executives were so impressed that they commented they would "hire Alex(is) right away".
  - Reward: A night's stay at the Grand Executive Suite of Hilton Kuala Lumpur
- Losing team: Mavericks
  - Reasons for loss: The team made many critical errors. Nazril left the room keys at the front desk, wasting precious time as they went down to collect the keys, and overstepped his power as an employee by giving a complimentary pizza to one of the guests. Dian left the manual that described the layout of the room at the front desk, leading the housekeeping team to be unsure of the layout of the room. Jonathan took down a room service order incorrectly: when the guest ordered Mediterranean Pizza with Grilled Chicken with Feta Cheese and Olives, Jonathan only took down the latter half of the order (Grilled Chicken with Feta Cheese and Olives), leading the kitchen to produce a special order incorrectly. Furthermore, the team made a HHonors Diamond VIP member (the highest level) wait for 45-minutes to check in, which Fernandes found unacceptable.
- Sent to boardroom: Jonathan, Nazril and Dian
  - Boardroom tension: Jonathan and Nazril accused Dian for having a lack of integrity by claiming the manual was "missing" instead of mentioning that she left it on the front desk, and pointed that she had not stepped up during the course of the entire interview. Fernandes agreed, but he decided to give Dian a second chance. Nevertheless, he warned Dian that she would be fired the following week if she failed to step up.
- Fired: Nazril Idrus "Nash" - for making too many mistakes, not just during this task, but in other challenges as well.
- Notes:
  - The reward for the previous week was shown in the prologue for this task.
  - The first time since Episode 2 that team Mavericks lose, breaking their three weeks winning streak. Start from this episode, there's no winning streak for either teams.
  - Andrea is on the losing team for the first time, breaking her five weeks winning streak.

==== Episode 7 ====
- Episode title: They Rap! They Beat-box! They Make Girls Cry!
- Air date: 3 July 2013
- Task: Design a new set of uniforms for AirAsia staff (guest services, weekend flight attendant and ramp attendant) and present them at a fashion show. The winner would be decided by AirAsia employees.
- Project managers:
  - Mavericks: Dian
  - Apex: Alexis
- Winning team: Mavericks
  - Reasons for win: The team produced functional and fashionable uniforms that many employees liked. They especially liked the detachable apron "Snapron" on the flight attendant’s uniform which helped prevent wear and tear on the waist area of the uniform while pushing meal trolleys, protect the uniform from spills and included pockets to fit spare change. They won 82 votes out of 137.
  - Reward: A flight lesson at the Airbus A320 flight simulator at the AirAsia Training Academy, taught by an AirAsia pilot.
- Losing team: Apex
  - Reasons for loss: Although the employees liked the guest services uniform, the cabin crew uniform was criticised for being too "old-fashioned", as well as having a white top which did not allow for easy clean-up after spills. They received 55 votes out of 137.
- Sent to boardroom: Alexis, Samuel and Celina
  - Boardroom tension: Alexis attacked Celina for her responsibility as the designer, and pointed out that she was insincere in handling people (at this point, a flashback to the previous episode was shown, in which Celina was seen attending to Hilton guests and Kathleen Tan criticising her for coming off as "insincere"). In return, Celina criticised Alexis for being a poor leader and not providing enough creative input to her designs.
- Fired: Celina Le Neindre - for being responsible for the design of the uniform, being reluctant to admit her own mistakes, and not showing enough interpersonal skills - which Fernandes felt was key in his organisation.

==== Episode 8 ====
- Episode title: An Immature Girl, A Scheming Man, And A Fake Tony Fernandes!
- Air date: 10 July 2013
- Task: Produce a live commercial for the Volkswagen Beetle (A5).
- Project managers:
  - Mavericks: Andrea
  - Apex: Samuel
- Winning team: Apex
  - Reasons for win: The team produced a commercial that best met the brief, providing relevant information about the car and having a memorable tagline "You qualify. Beetle up."
  - Reward: A BlackBerry Z10 each and a chance to contact their loved ones.
- Losing team: Mavericks
  - Reasons for loss: The executives felt that the commercial they produced was too cheesy, generic and unmemorable. While the initial concept was good, the execution was poorly done.
- Sent to boardroom: Andrea, Jonathan and Dian
  - Boardroom tension: Jonathan and Dian pointed out that Andrea was not mature enough and tended to come across as a negative influence in the team. Andrea agreed with some of the pointers but felt that her flaws were part of her personality and that she has proven that she has a strong skills set, winning all but 2 of the tasks. Advisor Kathleen Tan spoke directly to Dian, saying, “What are you doing here? This is the 8th task, and you're still not stepping up. I'm very disappointed. You've got to lead and not just shove the responsibility to your teammates!” This proved to be pivotal in Fernandes' decision, as he commented that Dian had already "lost Kathleen" and her teammates as well.
- Fired: Dian Krishna Mukti - for showing the least potential among the bottom three, and for failing to step up significantly in the entire course of the interview.
- Notes:
  - As noted by Fernandes, this is Andrea's first time being in the bottom three.

==== Episode 9 ====
- Episode title: And Then, There Were Two.
- Air date: 17 July 2013
- Task: Face one-on-one interviews with three of Fernandes' trusted associates. These associates would later meet in the boardroom with Fernandes and provide their inputs on the candidates. Two people will be fired. The interviewers are:
  - Stuart L. Dean, Chief Executive Officer of General Electric ASEAN
  - Aireen Omar, Chief Executive Officer of AirAsia
  - Ruben Gnanalingam, Chief Executive Officer of Westports Malaysia
- Boardroom tension: When Samuel mentioned that he previously worked with AirAsia people, Fernandes challenged him to mention some names. Samuel was stumped, while Alexis and Jonathan mentioned Aireen. However, Fernandes said that did not count, because they had just met her the same day. Andrea managed to name the five models that they worked with in Episode 7, impressing Fernandes. The other three were admonished by Fernandes for claiming that they were about "people and culture", but, in Fernandes's words, was all "bullshit". Fernandes said that he had 10,000-people working for him and he knew them all.
- Fired:
  - Samuel Rufus Nallaraj "Sam" - for not showing enough leadership, for being too analytical, and for his relaxed persona, which irked Fernandes as he felt that true passion translated into nervousness with every decision.
  - Alexis Lothar Bauduin "Alex" - although Fernandes was impressed with Alexis' performance over the previous challenges, he was unsure of Alexis' motivations, and had doubts if this was just a stepping stone towards other things in the future.
- Notes:
  - This is the fourth consecutive week that a candidate was fired after winning as project manager in the previous week.

==== Episode 10 ====
- Episode title: Bonnie And Clyde Organize A Charity Ball
- Air date: 24 July 2013
- Prologue: Recaps of the first nine episodes were shown.
- Task: Organise a charity black tie fundraiser for the AirAsia Foundation, with a cocktail event, charity auction and a Muay Thai demonstration.
- Teams: Six eliminated contestants were available to assist Jonathan and Andrea in the task. The choice of contestants was done by alternate selection. Jonathan won the coin toss and the right to choose team members first. In addition, he had first choice of all the selections during the task.
  - Team Jonathan: Samuel, Nazril, Celina
  - Team Andrea: Ningku, Alexis, Dian
- Notes:
  - In the spirit of the Foundation, the contestants would not be judged solely based on auction proceeds.
  - Unlike the American version of the show, both finalists worked on the same project instead of managing separate ones.

==== Episode 11 (Finale) ====
- Episode title: An Apprentice Is Chosen
- Air date: 31 July 2013
- Dramatic tension:
  - Jonathan's poster was criticised by AirAsia Foundation head Yap Mun Ching for having more negatives than positives, but Yap liked the idea of getting guests to sign on the poster.
  - Andrea fumbled with the speech during the cocktail event, failing to get the guests' attention. (She had a smaller platform than Jonathan, who had a full stage) However, Yap felt that Andrea brought across the message of the AirAsia Foundation better when interacting with the guests.
  - Jonathan conducted the auction well, however he was criticised for picking safe items that failed to attract the attention of the guests.
  - Andrea fumbled during the auction again. She lost track of bids and conducted herself in a casual and unprofessional manner. Moreover, the increase in bid amounts was too slow, leading guests to shout out bid amounts instead. However, her items attracted high bids. Notably, the Richard Branson charity flight was auctioned off for RM400,000, which the crowd gave a standing ovation to.
- Boardroom tension:
  - The six fired team members that helped out in the task were brought back to the boardroom, and were asked to provide their feedback on Andrea and Jonathan.
  - After the fired candidates left the boardroom, Fernandes pointed out that Andrea had a better winning record (6-2, 1-1 record as Project Manager, one time in bottom three) compared to Jonathan (4-4, 0-1 record as Project Manager, three times in bottom three). Jonathan pointed out that statistics are just numbers, and that even in his losses and Andrea's wins, he was a strong team member. Andrea felt that the statistics proved well that she had the versatility to do well in a wide range of tasks.
  - Andrea pointed out that on several occasions, Jonathan did not step up to be the Project Manager even though the task played to his strengths in marketing and branding.
  - Jonathan defended himself by arguing that he was a good team player by allowing others to be Project Manager instead of wasting time fighting over who should fill that position, and that he brought out the best in all his team members. He also pointed out Andrea's lack of positivity as a weakness, as she would shoot down ideas that she didn't like. Moreover, he doubted Andrea's intentions for being on the show.
  - Jonathan argued that he was a better candidate than Andrea because he brought the best out of his team members, together with strong passion, leadership, adaptability and resilience.
  - Andrea pointed out that she had greater potential, the right balance of intellect and emotion, and the drive to win.
  - Fernandes asked for his advisors' opinions on who should he hire. Kathleen Tan felt that Jonathan had better people skills, bringing out the best in people, and wondered if Andrea's emotions would be a hindrance in AirAsia. On the other hand, Mark Lankester felt that Andrea had more potential and humility, the qualities of an apprentice, and that she would be a better leader. Moreover, he felt that he has not seen "the real Jonathan" yet.
- Fired: Andrea Loh Ern-Yu
- Hired: Jonathan Allen Yabut "Jon"
- Notes:
  - The teams raised a total of RM1,308,900 during the auction. The breakdown of auction proceeds from each team was not announced, although it was hinted that Andrea earned more (The Richard Branson charity flight would have made up almost half the proceeds). As mentioned above, the candidates were not judged solely based on auction proceeds.
  - Jonathan won a year's contract with one of Tony Fernandes companies, reportedly AirAsia, with an undisclosed 6-figure starting salary.
