= The Apprentice Asia =

- Created by: Mark Burnett
- Directed by: Tony Fernandes
- Presented by: Tony Fernandes
- Starring: Tony Fernandes; Mark Lankester; Kathleen Tan
- Narrated by: Tony Fernandes
- Country of origin: Malaysia
- Original language: English
- No. of episodes: 11 (see episodes)

Production
- Producer: Tony Fernandes
- Production locations: Kuala Lumpur, Malaysia
- Running time: 60 minutes
- Production company: FremantleMedia Asia

Original release
- Network: AXN
- Release: 22 May – 31 July 2013

The Apprentice Asia is an Asian reality game show that was broadcast from May until July 2013. In this show, a group of aspiring young businesspeople compete for the chance to work with the host of the show, Malaysian entrepreneur Tony Fernandes. Dubbed as “The World’s Toughest Job Interview,” the show is the Asian version of the original American show, The Apprentice. It was aired on AXN Asia (also in several countries in Asia) and produced by FremantleMedia Asia.

== Overview ==
The Apprentice Asia was hosted by magnate Tony Fernandes, who was later joined by Mark Lankester, CEO of the Tune Hotels’ Group, Rob Jesudason, finance executive, and Kathleen Tan, CEO of Expedia Asia. The role of the hosts in this show is to analyze what went wrong with the contestants' strategies and business outcomes, and to determine which team member of the losing team should be "fired" from the show.

The first season started with 12 contestants, six men and six women from across Asia. All of the participants had been successful in various enterprises, including restaurant management, IT, and sales. During the show, the contestants lived communally in a suite in Kuala Lumpur, Malaysia, where they were divided into two teams based on their gender. Each week, Fernandes assigned the teams a task. Each team selected a "project manager" to lead them in the week's assigned task. The winning team received a reward, while the losing team faced a boardroom showdown with Fernandes and two of his associates in order to determine which team member would be fired. Elimination proceeded in two stages. In the first stage, Fernandes confronted the losing team and required the week's project manager to select two additional team members which the project manager believed were most responsible for the loss. The rest of the team was dismissed (allowed to go back up to the suite, because they were safe to stay for the next round), and the project manager and the two other selected members faced a final confrontation several minutes later in which Fernandes fired one of the three.

== Series overview ==
Series	Premiere date	Finale date	Winner	Runner-up	Notes & prize
1	22 May 2013	31 July 2013	Jonathan Allen Yabut	Andrea Loh Ern-Yu	A one-year contract and a six-figure salary job in Fernandes' airline, AirAsia.
