= AirAsia X =

Low-cost airline of Malaysia, operating long-haul flights

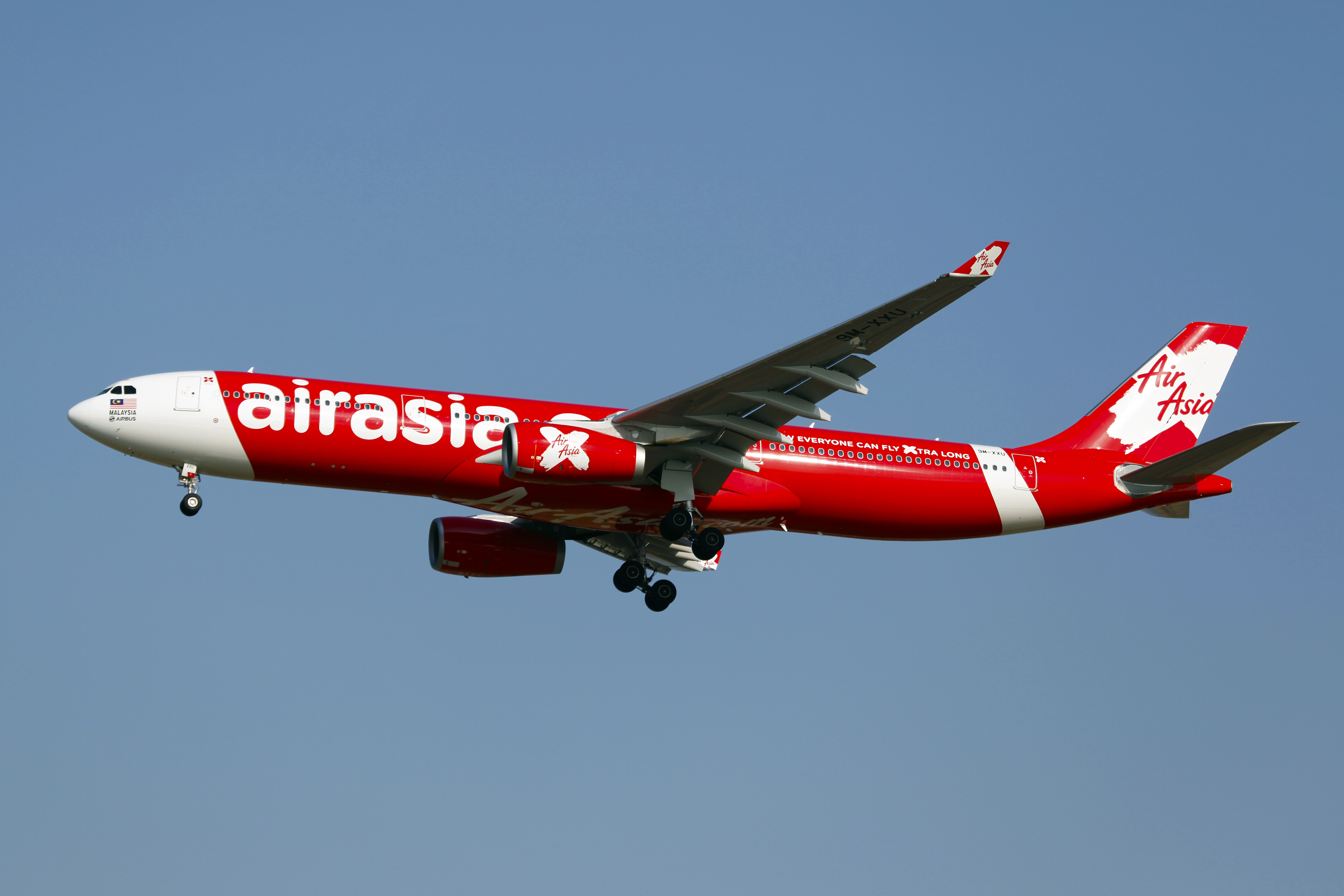
- An AirAsia X Airbus A330
IATA	ICAO	Call sign
D7	XAX	XANADU
- Founded: 17 May 2007; 19 years ago (as FlyAsianXpress)
- Commenced operations: 2 November 2007; 19 years ago
- Operating bases: Kuala Lumpur International Airport
- Frequent-flyer program: AirAsia Rewards
- Subsidiaries: Thai AirAsia X
- Fleet size: 20
- Destinations: 22
- Parent company: AirAsia
- Traded as: MYX: 5238
- ISIN: MYL5238OO000
- Headquarters: Sepang, Selangor, Malaysia
- Revenue: ▲MYR 3.25 billion (FY 2024)
- Net income: ▲MYR 183.58 million (FY 2024)
- Employees: 1,339 (31 December 2023)
- Website: www.airasia.com

AirAsia X Berhad, operating as AirAsia X (formerly FlyAsianXpress Sdn. Bhd.) is a Malaysian long-haul, low-cost airline and a subsidiary of the AirAsia Group. It was established in 2006 as FlyAsianXpress Sdn. Bhd. (FAX), initially operating regional routes under Malaysia's Rural Air Service before transitioning into a long-haul, low-cost carrier. The airline was rebranded as AirAsia X in 2007 and commenced its first international flight in November 2007, connecting Kuala Lumpur to Gold Coast, Australia.

The airline expanded its network across Asia, Australia and Europe, and was listed on Bursa Malaysia in 2013. Following the impact of the COVID-19 pandemic, AirAsia X underwent a restructuring of its operations and finances before gradually rebuilding its network. In 2026, the airline was consolidated with AirAsia under a unified structure and renamed AirAsia Group Bhd, ending AirAsia X's existence as a separate corporate entity.

== History ==
=== FlyAsianXpress ===
==== 2006–2007: Early operations ====
A FlyAsianXpress (FAX) DHC-6 Twin Otter aircraft, 2007

In 2006, FlyAsianXpress (FAX) was established as a subsidiary of AirAsia to operate Malaysia's Rural Air Service (RAS) routes, primarily serving destinations in Malaysian Borneo. The airline operated turboprop services on routes previously managed by Malaysia Airlines.

FAX faced several operational challenges, including low passenger demand on some routes, maintenance issues and flight disruptions. In April 2007, AirAsia chief executive officer Tony Fernandes proposed transferring the RAS operations to Firefly, a subsidiary of Malaysia Airlines, which had greater experience in regional turboprop operations. Following government approval, the transfer was completed on 26 April 2007, with the RAS network subsequently transferred to MASwings, a new subsidiary of Malaysia Airlines established to operate rural services in East Malaysia.

Following its withdrawal from the RAS network, FAX shifted its focus towards long-haul, low-cost operations. The airline was rebranded as AirAsia X in September 2007, marking its transition into a long-haul affiliate of the AirAsia network. The name was reportedly inspired by Yoshiki, the leader of Japanese rock band X Japan. To support its establishment, the airline secured investment from Virgin Group, which acquired a 20% stake in AirAsia X to support aircraft acquisition and operational expansion.

=== AirAsia X ===
Former AirAsia X logo, used from 2007 to 2022.

==== 2007–2010: Launch of AirAsia X and early expansion ====
Following its transition from FlyAsianXpress, the airline was rebranded as AirAsia X in September 2007, adopting a long-haul, low-cost carrier model within the AirAsia network. On 15 September 2007, the airline received its first aircraft at Kuala Lumpur International Airport. The aircraft, an Airbus A330, was named "Semangat Sir Freddie" ("Spirit of Sir Freddie") in honour of Sir Freddie Laker, a pioneer of low-cost aviation and founder of the Skytrain service.

AirAsia X commenced its first scheduled service on 2 November 2007, operating from Kuala Lumpur to Gold Coast Airport, Australia. Following the launch of its initial route, the airline expanded its international network between 2008 and 2009, adding destinations in Australia, including Melbourne and Perth, as well as Hangzhou, China.

In 2009, AirAsia X launched its first European route with services from Kuala Lumpur to London Stansted Airport, which was later transferred to London Gatwick Airport in 2011. The airline subsequently introduced flights to Paris Orly Airport in 2010.

==== 2010–2019: Network adjustments and growth ====
After experiencing early success, AirAsia X faced significant challenges starting in 2010. Rising fuel costs and intensified competition in the long-haul sector pressured the airline's profitability and cost management. In 2012, AirAsia X had to withdraw from several unprofitable routes, such as Delhi, Mumbai, Paris, London, Tianjin, and Tehran, but launched flights to Sydney and Beijing.

In 2013, AirAsia X launched an initial public offering (IPO) on the Bursa Malaysia stock exchange, raising MYR 988 million (US$310 million). The company acquired more Airbus A330 aircraft to strengthen its long-haul network. By 2015, the airline had introduced new destinations, including Sapporo, Japan.

The expansion continued into 2017, with AirAsia X launching flights to Honolulu, Hawaii, in June and Jeju, South Korea, in December. In 2018, the airline moved its Melbourne operations to Avalon Airport to reduce costs. 2019, the airline had added several new international routes from Kuala Lumpur, including services to Fukuoka, Lanzhou, Taipei, Osaka, Tokyo (Narita) and Singapore.

==== 2020–2025: COVID-19, restructuring and consolidation ====
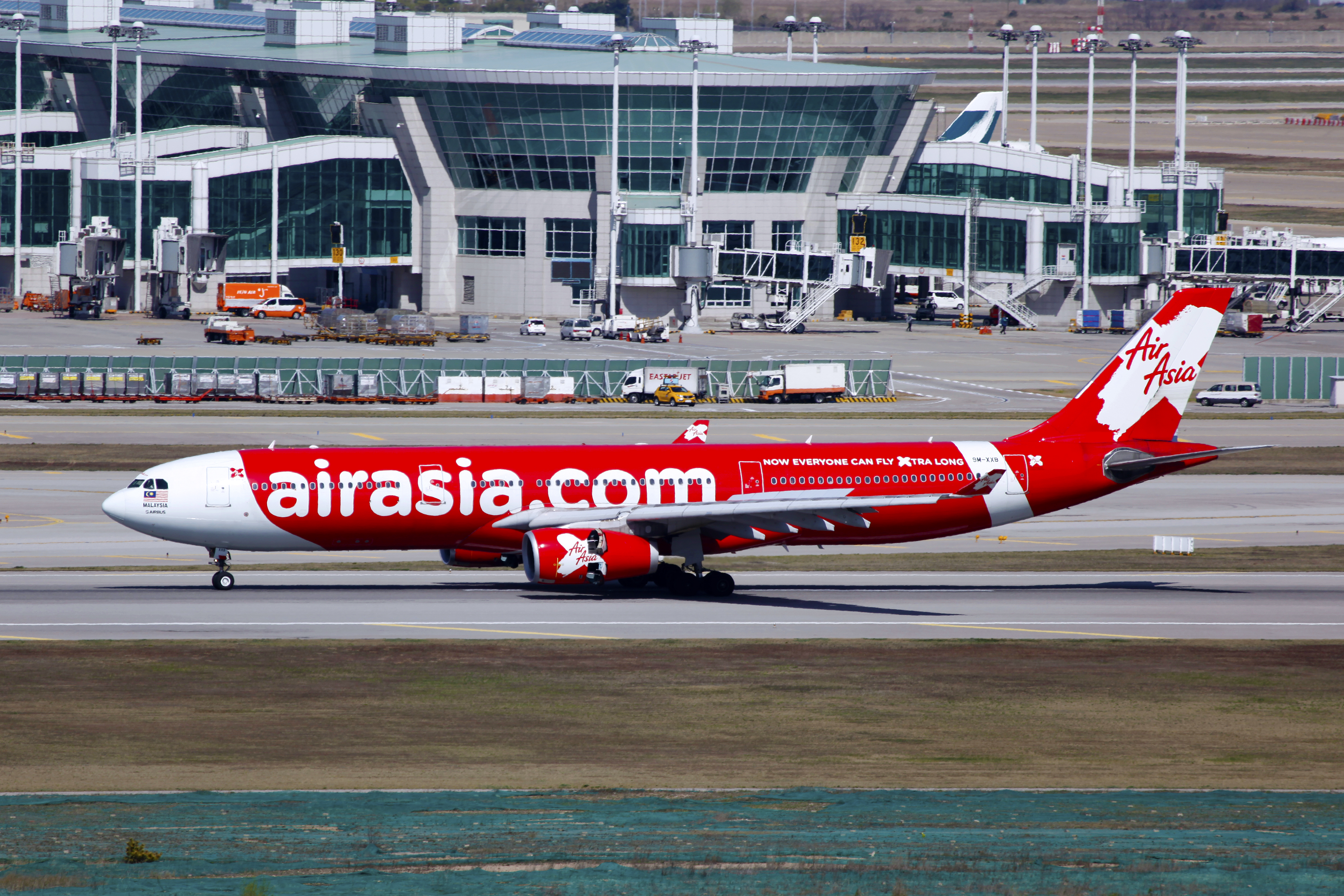
AirAsia X Airbus A330-343 at Incheon International Airport

The COVID-19 pandemic in 2020 caused significant disruption to global air travel, resulting in AirAsia X suspending scheduled passenger operations in March 2020. The suspension placed financial pressure on the airline, leading to the commencement of a debt restructuring process in October 2020.

AirAsia X completed its debt restructuring in March 2022 following court approval and gradually resumed services from April 2022, initially restoring flights to Seoul and Delhi. The airline continued rebuilding its network as international travel demand recovered, carrying more than 2.8 million passengers in 2023. During this period, AirAsia X expanded its network with the introduction of services to Nairobi, Kenya and Almaty, Kazakhstan.

In December 2024, AirAsia announced plans to consolidate its long-haul and short-haul operations under a single airline group structure. The consolidation formed part of a broader restructuring of its parent company, Capital A Berhad. Following the completion of the integration, AirAsia X was renamed AirAsia Group Bhd in July 2026. The move ended AirAsia X's status as a separate corporate entity, with its operations incorporated into AirAsia's unified network.

== Destinations ==
As of October 2026, AirAsia X flies (or has flown) operated to the following destinations:

Country/Region	City	Airport	Notes	Refs
Australia	Adelaide	Adelaide Airport	Terminated	
Australia	Geelong	Avalon Airport	Terminated	
Australia	Gold Coast	Gold Coast Airport	Terminated	
Australia	Melbourne	Melbourne Airport		
Australia	Perth	Perth Airport	Terminated	
Australia	Sydney	Sydney Airport	Ends 25 October 2026	
China	Beijing	Beijing Capital International Airport	Terminated	
China	Beijing	Beijing Daxing International Airport		
China	Changsha	Changsha Huanghua International Airport	Ends 26 October 2026	
China	Chengdu	Chengdu Shuangliu International Airport	Terminated	
China	Chengdu	Chengdu Tianfu International Airport		
China	Chongqing	Chongqing Jiangbei International Airport	Ends 24 October 2026	
China	Hangzhou	Hangzhou Xiaoshan International Airport		
China	Lanzhou	Lanzhou Zhongchuan International Airport	Terminated	
China	Shanghai	Shanghai Pudong International Airport		
China	Wuhan	Wuhan Tianhe International Airport	Terminated	
China	Xi'an	Xi'an Xianyang International Airport		
France	Paris	Orly Airport	Terminated	
Hong Kong	Hong Kong	Hong Kong International Airport	Terminated	
India	Ahmedabad	Ahmedabad Airport	Terminated	
India	Amritsar	Sri Guru Ram Das Ji International Airport	Terminated	
India	Delhi	Indira Gandhi International Airport	Ends 23 October 2026	
India	Jaipur	Jaipur International Airport	Terminated	
India	Mumbai	Chhatrapati Shivaji Maharaj International Airport	Terminated	
Indonesia	Denpasar	Ngurah Rai International Airport		
Iran	Tehran	Imam Khomeini International Airport	Terminated	
Japan	Fukuoka	Fukuoka Airport	Terminated	
Japan	Nagoya	Chubu Centrair International Airport	Terminated	
Japan	Naha	Naha Airport	Terminated	
Japan	Osaka	Kansai International Airport		
Japan	Sapporo	New Chitose Airport		
Japan	Tokyo	Haneda Airport		
Japan	Tokyo	Narita International Airport	Terminated	
Kazakhstan	Almaty	Almaty International Airport		
Kenya	Nairobi	Jomo Kenyatta International Airport	Terminated	
Malaysia	Kota Kinabalu	Kota Kinabalu International Airport	Seasonal	
Malaysia	Kuala Lumpur	Kuala Lumpur International Airport	Base	
Malaysia	Kuching	Kuching International Airport	Terminated	
Maldives	Malé	Velana International Airport	Terminated	
Mauritius	Mauritius	Sir Seewoosagur Ramgoolam International Airport	Terminated	
Nepal	Kathmandu	Tribhuvan International Airport	Terminated	
New Zealand	Auckland	Auckland Airport	Terminated	
New Zealand	Christchurch	Christchurch Airport	Terminated	
Pakistan	Karachi	Jinnah International Airport		
Saudi Arabia	Jeddah	King Abdulaziz International Airport	Seasonal	
Saudi Arabia	Medina	Prince Mohammad bin Abdulaziz International Airport		
Singapore	Singapore	Changi Airport	Terminated	
South Korea	Busan	Gimhae International Airport		
South Korea	Jeju	Jeju International Airport	Terminated	
South Korea	Seoul	Incheon International Airport	Ends 25 October 2026	
Sri Lanka	Colombo	Bandaranaike International Airport	Terminated	
Taiwan	Kaohsiung	Kaohsiung International Airport	Terminated	
Taiwan	Taipei	Taoyuan International Airport		
Thailand	Bangkok	Suvarnabhumi Airport	Terminated	
Turkey	Istanbul	Sabiha Gökçen International Airport		
United Arab Emirates	Abu Dhabi	Zayed International Airport	Terminated	
United Kingdom	London	Gatwick Airport	Terminated	
United Kingdom	London	London Stansted Airport	Terminated	
United States	Honolulu	Daniel K. Inouye International Airport	Terminated	
Uzbekistan	Tashkent	Tashkent International Airport		

== Fleet ==
=== Current fleet ===
As of July 2026, AirAsia X operates the following aircraft:

AirAsia X fleet
Aircraft	In service	Orders	Passengers				Notes
Aircraft	In service	Orders	C	W	Y	Total	Notes
Airbus A321XLR	1	19	—	—	232	232	
Airbus A330-300	19		12	—	365	377	To be retired by 2031.
Airbus A330-300	19		18	22	267	309	To be retired by 2031.
Airbus A330-300	19		—	—	367	367	To be retired by 2031.
Total	20	19					

=== Former fleet ===
As of August 2025, AirAsia X operated 18 Airbus A330-300.

=== Fleet development ===
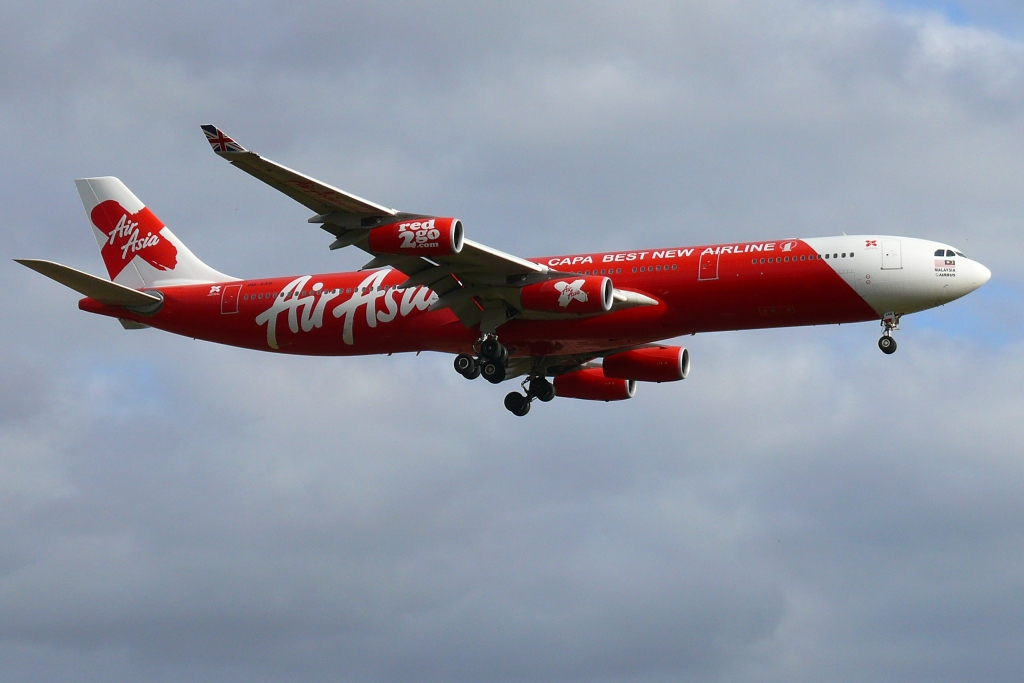
An AirAsia X Airbus A340-300, 2009

In 2009, AirAsia X placed an order for 10 Airbus A350-900 aircraft but canceled the order in April 2018 due to rising prices. During a business forum in Manila in February 2018, Tony Fernandes revealed that the airline was considering the Boeing 787 Dreamliner for fleet expansion. However, a month later, the decision was made not to pursue the Boeing aircraft.

By September 2018, reports indicated that AirAsia X was exploring the use of Airbus A321neo and A321LR aircraft alongside its Airbus A330 fleet. The airline believed that using narrow-body aircraft on shorter routes, with a maximum flight time of 7.9 hours, could result in cost savings of up to 16% on variable costs and 5% on fixed costs.

In March 2020, AirAsia X announced that the delivery of its Airbus A330-900 aircraft would be delayed indefinitely. This decision was made in response to the disruptions caused by the COVID-19 pandemic. However, by June 2022, the airline confirmed its commitment to receiving Airbus A330neos and A321XLRs, with deliveries expected to begin in 2026, as it gradually resumed operations after a two-year hiatus. However, in early 2026, the airline cancelled their order of the fifteen Airbus A330-900 as part of the company's reorganisation and intention to exit widebody operations, and transition to an all all-narrowbody operation consisting of the Airbus A321s.

== Corporate affairs ==
=== Headquarters and corporate office ===
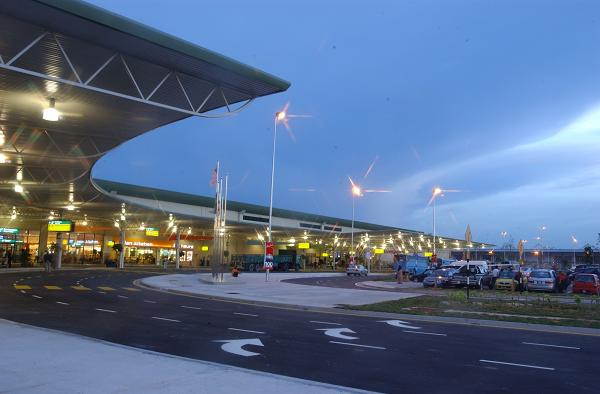
KLIA LCCT, which housed the AirAsia X head office prior to the opening of RedQuarters

The head office and registered office of AirAsia X are currently located at the RedQ facility at Kuala Lumpur International Airport Terminal 2 in Sepang, Selangor. The airline's previous head office was at the LCC Terminal at KLIA, while its registered office was situated on Level 12 of Menara Prima Tower B in Petaling Jaya, Selangor.

AirAsia X had planned to relocate to a new 613,383-square-foot (56,985.1 m^{2}) facility at klia2, which was completed to house around 2,000 AirAsia and AirAsia X employees. The new headquarters, known as "RedQuarters" or "RedQ," was named by Filipina flight attendant January Ann Baysa, and its groundbreaking ceremony took place in November 2014.

=== Cost structure and operational efficiency ===
AirAsia X operates with one of the lowest costs among long-haul airlines globally, with a Cost per Available Seat-Kilometre (CASK) of US$0.0351 in 2015, or US$0.0240 excluding fuel costs. This enables the airline to offer fares 30 to 50% lower than traditional long-haul carriers. The airline also collaborates with its affiliate, AirAsia, to streamline operations, such as staff management, fuel hedging, marketing and computer systems, benefiting from economies of scale typically unavailable to smaller airlines.

=== Shareholders ===
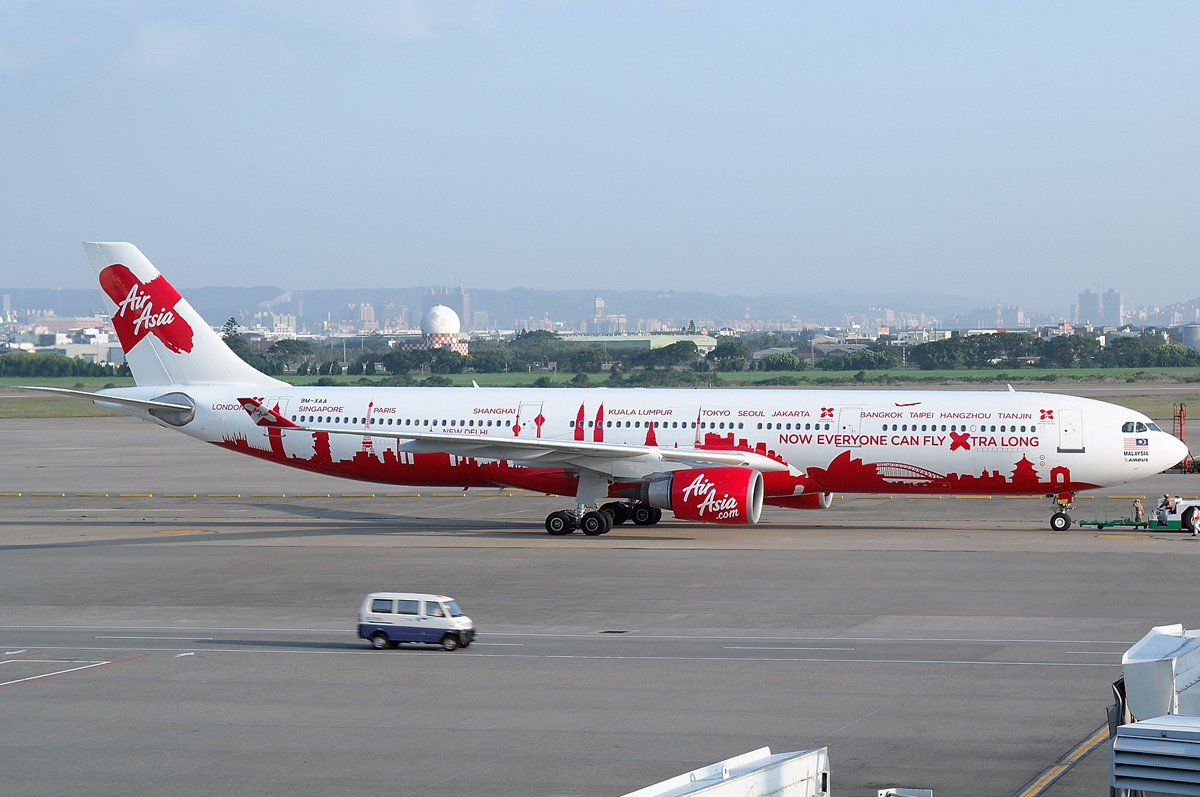
AirAsia X Airbus A330-300 at Taoyuan International Airport in November 2011, featuring a special livery with the tagline "Now Everyone Can Fly Xtra Long"

The entry of two major investors provided AirAsia X with crucial financial support for its future expansion plans. This investment was aimed at assisting the airline's growth and development.

As of 14 February 2008, Aero Ventures, a venture involving Tony Fernandes, other prominent Malaysians and Air Canada's Robert Milton, owned 48% of AirAsia X. Virgin Group held a 16% stake, while AirAsia owned an additional 16%. Bahrain-based Manara Consortium and Japan's Orix Corp acquired a combined 20% stake in AirAsia X for RM250 million.

AirAsia X was listed on Bursa Malaysia (Kuala Lumpur Stock Exchange) on 10 July 2013, with shares offered to both individual and institutional investors at MYR1.25 (approximately US$0.39) per share. The listing raised MYR988 million (US$310 million at 2013 exchange rates) and valued the company at MYR3 billion (US$940 million). The shares performed poorly on their first day, closing unchanged and recording what Bloomberg described as the "second-worst trading debut in Malaysia" that year. As of 10 October 2016, shares were priced at MYR0.39, giving the company a market value of MYR1.62 billion (US$390 million at 2016 exchange rates). As of 10 October 2016, shares of AirAsia X Berhad were trading at MYR0.39, giving the company a market value of MYR1.62 billion (US$390 million at 2016 exchange rates).

According to data from Bloomberg cited by The Edge in February 2022, the largest shareholder of AirAsia X Berhad was Tune Group, a private investment vehicle owned by Tony Fernandes and Kamarudin Meranun, holding a 17.8% stake. The two collectively held an indirect stake of 31.59%, with Capital A, the parent company of AirAsia, owning an additional 13.8%.

== Affiliate airlines ==
=== Indonesia AirAsia X ===
Indonesia AirAsia X was the medium and long-haul division of Indonesia AirAsia, operating cost-efficient services with shared ticketing, aircraft livery, and management style. It initially served medium-haul routes from Bali to Mumbai and Tokyo, and short-haul flights from Jakarta, Denpasar and Surabaya. However, it faced disruptions, including the cancellation of its Melbourne route in 2014 due to lack of government approval, and ended its Taipei route in September 2015.

In late 2018, the airline announced it would cease scheduled operations by January 2019, transitioning to non-scheduled services. It ultimately ceased all operations and was liquidated on 17 October 2020 as part of AirAsia's restructuring.

=== Thai AirAsia X ===
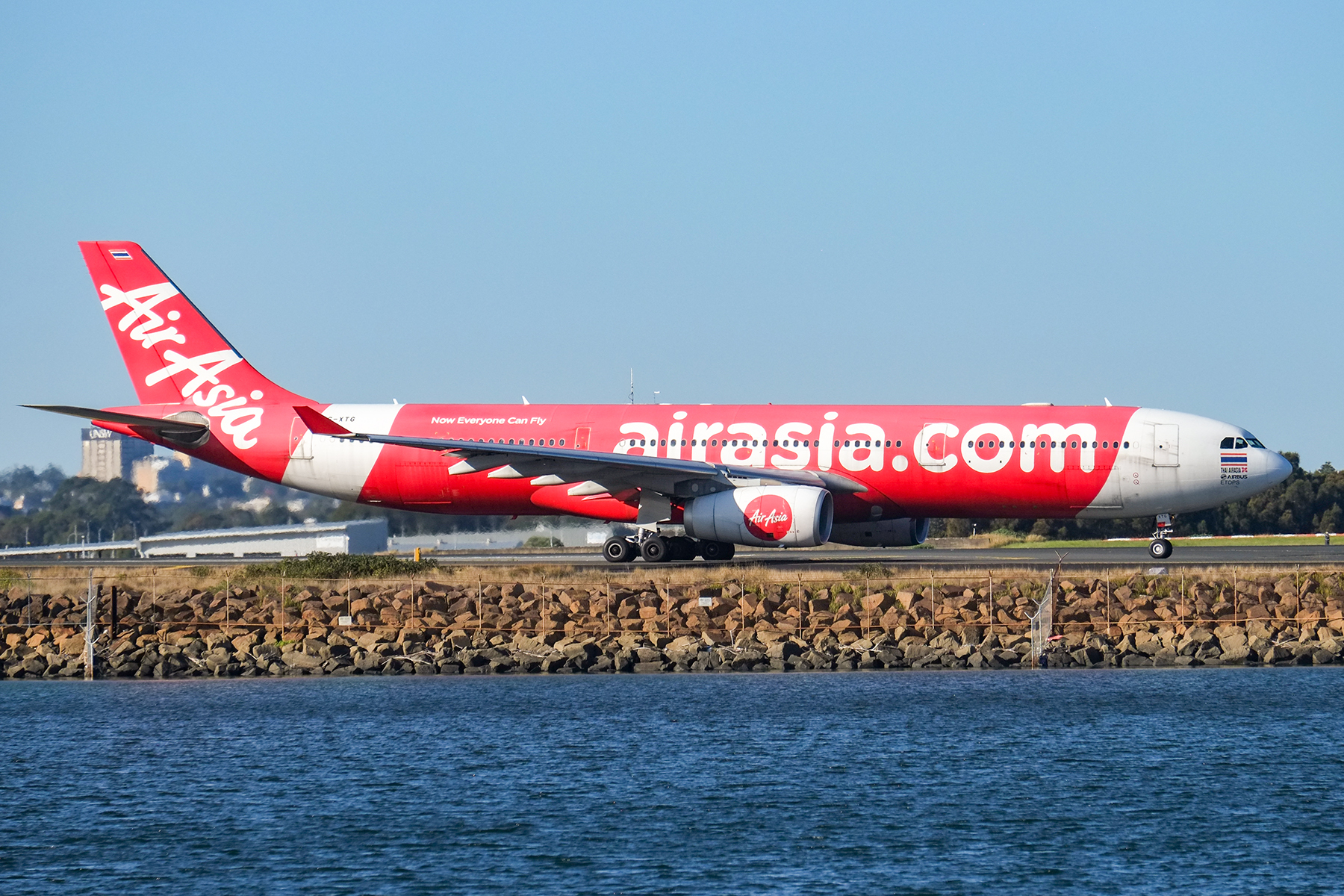
Airbus A330-343 of Thai AirAsia X at Sydney Airport, August 2023.

Thai AirAsia X, a joint venture between AirAsia and Thai entrepreneurs Tassapon Bijleveld and Julpas Krueospon, was established on 18 September 2013, with AirAsia holding a 49% stake. The airline, as the long-haul arm of Thai AirAsia, commenced operations in June 2014 with its first flight to Seoul and expanded to other destinations such as Osaka and Tokyo. It operates with shared systems, aircraft livery, and management styles, benefiting from cost efficiencies.

In December 2016, Thai AirAsia X ended its Middle East routes, and in August 2019, it took delivery of its first Airbus A330neo. After facing disruptions due to the COVID-19 pandemic, including a suspension of domestic flights in 2021, the airline announced in 2022 that it would relocate its operations to Suvarnabhumi Airport and filed for bankruptcy, which did not affect its ongoing services.

== See also ==
- AirAsia
- List of airlines of Malaysia
- Transport in Malaysia
