= Red Planet =

Red Planet may refer to:

- Mars, the planet, due to its surface color
- Red Planet (novel) by Robert A. Heinlein (1949)
  - Red Planet (miniseries), a 1994 animated adaptation of the novel
- Red Planet (film), a 2000 film starring Val Kilmer
- Red Planet (game), a BattleTech game scenario (ca. 1993)
- The Red Planet, an album by Rick Wakeman (2020)
- Red Planet Hotels, a regional hotel chain in Indonesia, Japan, the Philippines and Thailand
- Red Planet Mars a 1952 film based on a 1932 play Red Planet
- Mission: Red Planet, a 2005 boardgame by Bruno Cathala and Bruno Faidutti
- "Red Planet", an episode in the game Angry Birds Space
- "Red Planet", a song by Little Mix featuring T-Boz from their debut album, DNA (2012)
- "Red Planet", a song by the Canadian indie band Alvvays from their eponymous debut album (2014)
- Red Planet, the source of the J-Jewel in The King of Braves GaoGaiGar
