= Kamarudin Meranun =

Malaysian businessman (born 1960)

Yang Berbahagia Datuk Kamarudin Meranun PJN DSAP DSPN
- Born: 1960 (age 65–66); Miri, Crown Colony of Sarawak (now Malaysia)
- Education: Diploma in Actuarial Science (Universiti Teknologi MARA)
- Occupations: CEO of Tune Group; Executive Chairman of AirAsia; Non-Independent Executive Chairman of Capital A Founder of MILK Baby Diapers
- Board member of: Queens Park Rangers F.C. (2011 - 2022)
- Children: 5
- Awards: Life Insurance Institute of Malaysia Best Actuarial Student 1983

Kamarudin bin Meranun is a Malaysian businessman who is currently the Chairman of AirAsia and CEO of the Tune Group.

== Early life ==
Kamarudin was born in Sarawak, 1960. He is of Minangkabau descent from Gugukrendah, Agam, West Sumatra. He received a Diploma in Actuarial Science from Universiti Teknologi MARA and received the Life Insurance Institute of Malaysia Best Actuarial Student award in 1983.

== Business career ==
From 1988 to 1993, Kamarudin worked for the Arab-Malaysian Merchant Bank as a Portfolio Manager. He then moved in 1994 to Innosabah Executive Management as executive director. He co-founded and was appointed Director of AirAsia with Tony Fernandes in 2001, then as Executive director in 2004, then as Deputy CEO in 2005. He took on the role of Treasurer on top of that in 2012. Later that year, he moved into the role of Director, then moved to the role of Chairman of AirAsia in 2013, a role which he still holds as of 2016. He was appointed CEO of AirAsia X between 2015 and 2026. He is currently the Executive Chairman of AirAsia's parent company Capital A Berhad.

Kamarudin also served as a board member of the Queens Park Rangers Football Club alongside Tony Fernandes in 2011 - 2022.

Kamarudin launched the baby diapers brand MILK in 2025.

== Honours ==
- Malaysia
  - Commander of the Order of Meritorious Service (PJN) - Datuk (2013)
- Pahang
  - Knight Companion of the Order of Sultan Ahmad Shah of Pahang (DSAP) - Dato' (2008)
- Penang
  - Officer of the Order of the Defender of State (DSPN) - Datuk (2006)
