= Red Planet Hotels =

Thai company

- Type: Private company
- Industry: Hotel
- Founded: 2010
- Headquarters: Bangkok, Thailand
- Number of locations: 32
- Areas served: Japan, Indonesia, Philippines, Thailand
- Website: www.redplanethotels.com

Red Planet Hotels, founded in 2010, is a privately owned regional hotel company focused on Asia's expanding value hotel sector. The company owns and operates 32 hotels in Indonesia, Japan, the Philippines, and Thailand with a total of 5,151 rooms.

== History ==
Red Planet opened its first hotel in Hat Yai, Thailand in December 2011. In July 2015, Red Planet announced that it had ended its partnership with Tune Hotels and rebranded all of its properties in the Philippines, Thailand, Indonesia, and Japan.

In September 2016, Reuters reported Red Planet received a US$70 million investment from Goldman Sachs to facilitate Red Planet's planned regional expansion.

Since 2010, Red Planet has raised US$240 million in funding from investors. The company said it planned to raise one final round of capital before an IPO.

== Rooms ==
Red Planet Hotels' rooms are consistent across all properties. Additionally, the hotel offers twin, double, deluxe double, and disabled-accessible rooms.

== Listed Subsidiaries ==
In June 2014, Red Planet's Indonesian subsidiary was listed on the Indonesia Stock Exchange. Red Planet Japan is also listed on the JASDAQ Securities Exchange.

== Hotel Locations ==
As of August 2020, Red Planet operates 32 hotels in four countries and has 7 hotels under development.

=== Philippines ===
Operational:

- Red Planet Manila Amorsolo
- Red Planet Angeles City
- Red Planet Manila Aseana City
- Red Planet Cagayan de Oro
- Red Planet Cebu City
- Red Planet Davao City
- Red Planet Manila Mabini
- Red Planet Manila Makati
- Red Planet Manila Ortigas
- Red Planet Quezon Timog
- Red Planet Manila Bay
- Red Planet Aurora Boulevard
- Red Planet Manila Binondo

Under Development:

- Red Planet Quezon Avenue
- Red Planet Cebu Fuente Circle
- Red Planet Manila The Fort
- Red Planet Quezon North Avenue
- Red Planet Manila Entertainment City

=== Thailand ===
Operational:

- Red Planet Bangkok Asoke
- Red Planet Hat Yai
- Red Planet Phuket Patong
- Red Planet Pattaya
- Red Planet Bangkok Surawong

Under Development:

- Red Planet Bangkok Sukhumvit 8

=== Indonesia ===
Operational:

- Red Planet Bekasi
- Red Planet Makassar
- Red Planet Palembang
- Red Planet Jakarta Pasar Baru
- Red Planet Pekanbaru
- Red Planet Solo
- Red Planet Surabaya

=== Japan ===
Operational:

- Red Planet Tokyo Asakusa
- Red Planet Gotanda Tokyo
- Red Planet Okinawa Naha
- Red Planet Nagoya Nishiki
- Red Planet Sapporo Susukino South
- Red Planet Sapporo Susukino Central
- Red Planet Hiroshima

Under Development:

- Red Planet Kyoto Nijo
