= Tune Group =

Leisure and entertainment corporation

Tune Group Sdn Bhd
- Type: Private Limited Company
- Industry: Entertainment, Leisure
- Headquarters: Wisma Tune, Jalan Dungun, Bukit Damansara, Kuala Lumpur, Malaysia
- Key people: Tony Fernandes (chairman); Kamarudin Meranun (CEO)
- Subsidiaries: AirAsia; Tune Hotels; ASEAN Basketball League; Tune Talk; Tune Live; Tune Protect
- Website: www.tunegroup.com

Tune Group Sdn Bhd (or Tune Group Sendirian Berhad, meaning 'private limited') is a leisure and entertainment corporation founded by the Malaysian entrepreneurs Tony Fernandes and Kamarudin Meranun. It has airline, hotel, telecommunication, financial services, sports, media and creative industries subsidiaries. Its subsidiaries include: budget airline AirAsia; Caterham Group, a motor engine-based technology company, through which it formerly owned the Caterham F1 Team; and Queens Park Rangers, an English football club. Tune Group was the official shirt sponsor of FA match officials until 2013.

== History ==
Tune was founded in late 2001 with the purchase of AirAsia by Tune Air Sdn Bhd on 2 December 2001. In 2013, Tune Group expanded its low budget hotel business (Tune Hotels) in Australia.

In 2018, Tune Hotels are no longer managed by Tune Group and currently under the management of Ormond Group.

== Businesses ==
- AirAsia Berhad
- Tune Talk Sdn Bhd
- Tune Hotels Regional Services Sdn Bhd
- Tune Money Sdn Bhd
- Think Big Digital Sdn Bhd
- Tune Protect Group Berhad
- Tune Studios Sdn Bhd
- QPR Asia Sdn Bhd
- Tune Box Sdn Bhd
- Educ8 Group Sdn Bhd
- Caterham Group

== Sponsorship ==
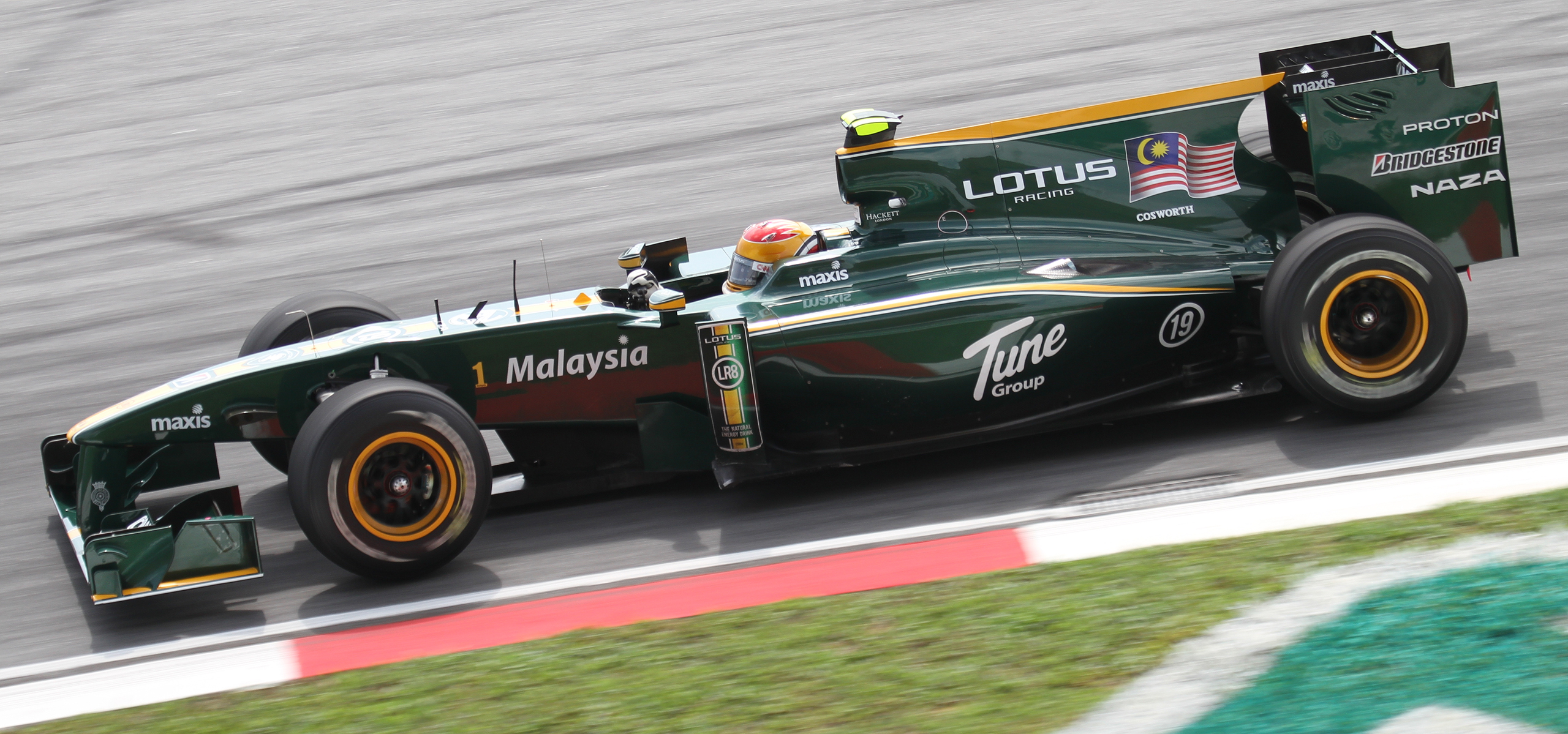
Lotus Racing car with Tune Group logos.

Tune Group is a partner of The Football League and the FA Cup. It contracted to partner the Professional Games Match Officials (PGMO) for seven years and ran for three years for the course of the 2010–2011 season. Previously, PGMO was affiliated with the Tune Group subsidiary AirAsia.

== See also ==
- Tune Ventures
