= Room service =

Hotel service

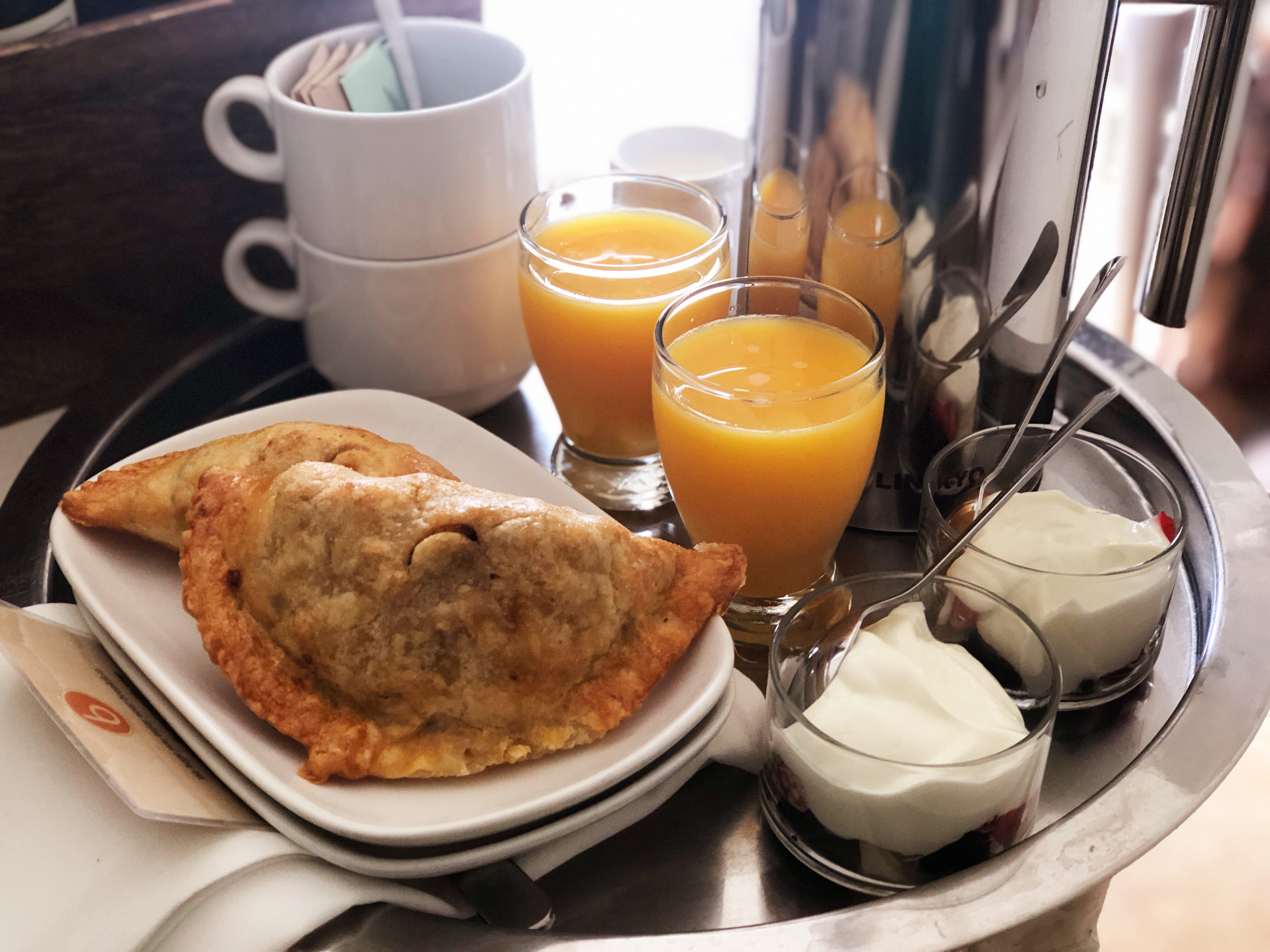
Room service with empanadas at Boon Hotel + Spa in Guerneville, California.

Room service or in-room dining is a hotel or cruise ship service enabling guests to choose items of food and drink for delivery to their hotel room for consumption. Room service is organized as a subdivision within the food and beverage department of high-end hotel and resort properties. It is uncommon for room service to be offered in small hotels, or in motels. Room service may also be provided for guests on cruise ships. Room service may be provided on a 24-hour basis or limited to late night hours only. Due to the cost of customized orders and delivery of room service, prices charged to the patron are typically much higher than in the hotel's restaurant or tuck shop, and a gratuity is expected in some regions.

== History ==
The Waldorf Astoria hotel in New York — already a symbol of fame and distinction from its construction during the late 19th century — is credited as being the first modern hotel to offer room service (along with other industry advancements, including restaurant reservations and full electrical wiring).

Room service became a necessary amenity for any high-end hotel and is commonly found at hotels worldwide. Unique room service offerings include: singer-songwriters with cocktails and appetizers at the Thompson Nashville in Tennessee, s'mores and champagne at the Carneros Resort & Spa in Napa Valley, and straight-to-room vinyl record deliveries at the Moxy East Village in New York.

During the COVID-19 pandemic, hotels suspended traditional room service in 2020 and recommended food company deliveries to their guests, who then became comfortable with outside room service management. Resorts World Las Vegas opened in June 2021 with the first partnership between a resort and a food delivery App, Grubhub, followed by numerous other major hoteliers contracting with delivery companies to provide room service, including Uber Eats, DoorDash, GoPuff and Grubhub.

According to the 2025 Hotel Room Innsights report by Hotels.com, robots that deliver room service are a new trend, despite the fact that 70% of hotel guests say they prefer to speak to a human for support. The 2024 version of this annual survey found that 75% of room service orders cost $50 or less, and 30% cost $10 or less. The survey also cited some of the strangest room service orders hotels had received, such as a hot dog bun filled with caviar, five drops of vodka, four pounds of bananas, burnt toast, and a bathtub filled with Evian bottled water.

== Standards ==
Organizations tend to have their own standards for room service, as there are no universally held best practices as they differ from business to business and the best practice depends on the guest's perspective, but generally it can be considered the guest's ability to order a meal, the meal being prepared and be served the product in the privacy of their own room as to maximize the customers comfort.

=== Occupations ===
A variety of hotel staff categories work on room service.

==== Hotel management ====
The role of hotel management in regards to room service is to ensure guest satisfaction and to address any complaints and queries that may arise. Their responsibilities also include recruiting, training and supervising staff, and they also manage the budget to maintain financial records, planning maintenance, events and the bookings for rooms, promotions and marketing.

==== Restaurant manager ====
In addition to making guests feel welcome and providing an enjoyable dining experience, restaurant managers are responsible for processing room service orders accurately and efficiently and ensuring compliance of the relevant health and safety regulations. The restaurant manager is responsible for recruiting, training, supervising staff, managing budgets, menu planning, greeting customer and handling the customers complaints and inquires.

==== Waiter/waitress ====
Waiters and waitresses (also known as "servers") are responsible for setting up the hotel restaurant, delivering food to rooms, and making sure that guests have everything they need. Their responsibilities often include greeting and escorting customers, presenting, understanding specials, the information on the menu, preparation of tables, utensils and glasses and communicating between the kitchen staff.

==== Executive chef ====
Executive chefs also known as head chef are responsible for overseeing the operations that occur in the kitchen. They monitor and maintain the quality of all dishes that are served to customers, create menus, invent new dishes, and supervise the kitchen staff. Their responsibilities tend to be administrative in nature. The executive chef is mostly coordinating the other cooks as well as inspecting the kitchen equipment for sanitary reasons to keep with sanitation policies, they can also hire and train, maintaining food ingredient stocks.

==== Kitchen staff ====
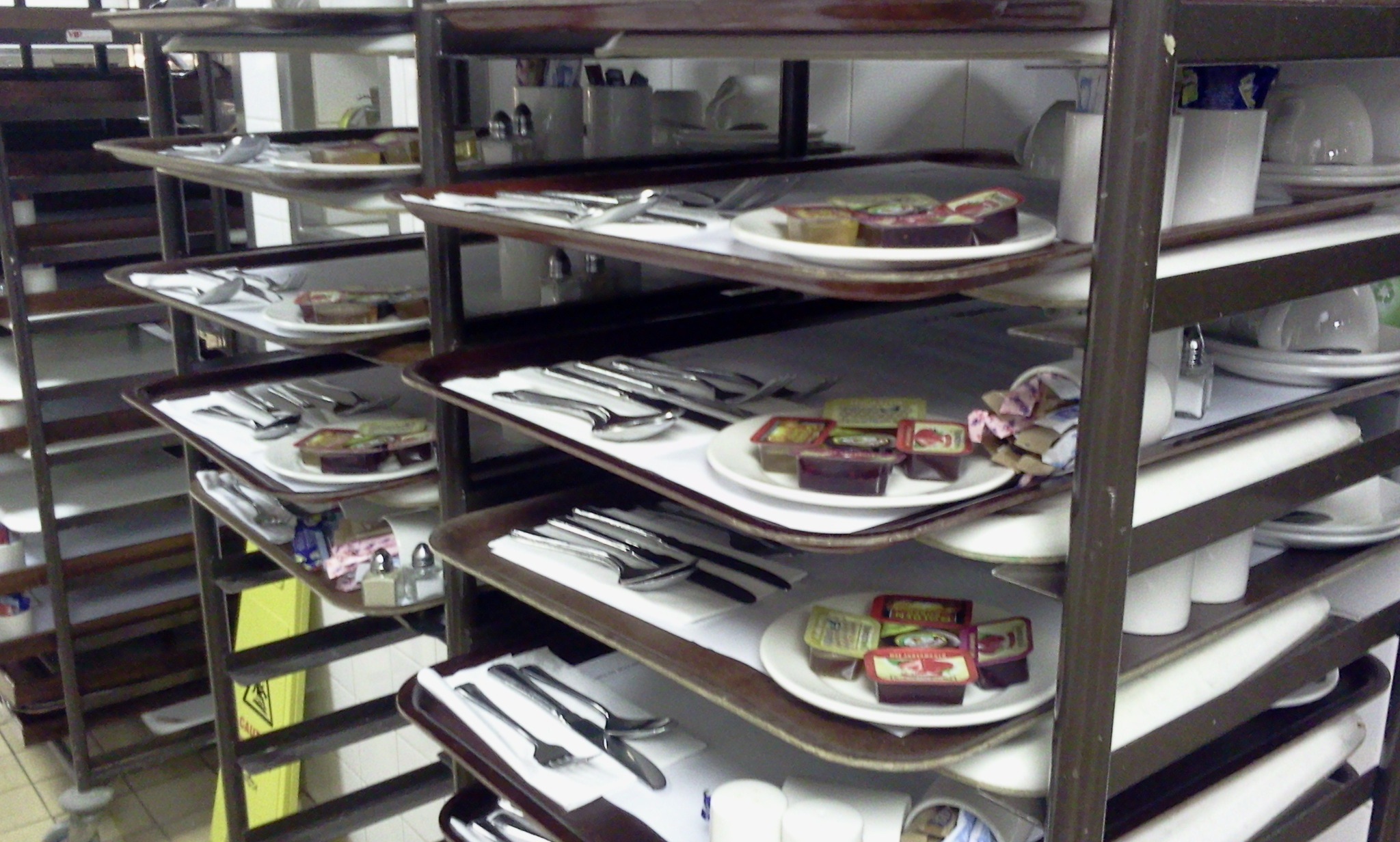
Room service trays stacked in the kitchen, waiting for delivery.

The kitchen staff is responsible for preparing the food according to service standards and work procedures. They assist chefs as they cook, evaluate the quality of ingredients, and place orders with suppliers. In addition, they schedule the delivery of food or beverages and supervise kitchen production as part of their duties. Kitchen staff usually have a large range of jobs within the fast-paced kitchen, though they are mostly used to assist head cooks and other staff members with the meal preparation. Basic food preparation includes organizing the kitchen and ingredient preparation to make cooking and presenting the meal as efficient as possible, though it also includes washing, cutting and peeling. They also properly store the ingredients in the kitchen, storeroom and cold storage even moving supplies if necessary, proper cleaning and sanitizing of equipment, dishes, floors, counter-tops and cutting boards to maintain sanitation and health standards.

==== Housekeeping manager ====
The housekeeping manager, similar to other manager roles, is responsible for planning, organizing and developing the housekeeping departments. They oversee staffing, training of the staff and scheduling. They manage daily activities such as the cleaning, seating areas, washroom, restaurants, suites and all public areas, guaranteeing customer satisfaction through effective planning and organization of team members, supervision of housekeeping and grounds keeping staff, maintaining supplies, equipment and budget, recruiting and training staff and even conducting inspections of public areas.

==== Housekeeping supervisor ====
A housekeeping supervisor role is to oversee the activities of the staff that clean the facilities to make sure of the sanitation, orderly and appeal of the rooms is up to high standard in the hotel but can also include other establishments such as hospitals and anything in a similar regard. they may also assist in the duties of other staff members and inspect the work, they also address the complaints and inquires about the housekeeping service as well as recruit and train new staff members.

==== Continental breakfast attendant ====
The continental breakfast attendant's main role is to provide a hot and cold breakfast buffet service throughout the morning. A continental breakfast usually includes coffee, juice, jam, fruit, and baked goods such as bread and pastries, items chosen because they are shelf-stable, and can be served in portion sizes that are appropriate for large groups of people. The attendant cleans the serving area during the breakfast, refills empty serving dishes or jugs and supplies (e.g., napkins), ensures equipment such as toasters and coffeemakers are functioning well, and answers patron questions. After breakfast, the attendant cleans and prepares the area for the next morning. The attendant may also prepare ingredients, refill beverage dispensers, clean and replenish utensils. Attendants may even do duties similar to a waiter for customers that have special needs. Attendants may have to do paperwork or record-keeping.

==== Food runner ====
The food runner can serve multiple roles, but the main function is to acts as the "middle man" between the customer and the kitchen staff, both delivering food to the correct table as quick as possible, assisting staff with the priority of orders and addressing any customer issue that suddenly arises. Generally any business that serves food to customers have food runners such as bars and coffee shops and even room service, being able to switch between front and back of the house. Food runner's duties are to deliver food, identifying customers questions and complaints and addressing those appropriately, greeting guests, providing and explaining the menu, inspecting the food, clearing and cleaning tables.

==== Hotel security ====
Hotel security monitor the security system in the restaurant and communal areas of the hotel. They establish and maintain emergency procedures, and identify and implement risk management programs on order to be prepared for an unlikely emergency situation such as food poisoning.

=== Advantages and disadvantages ===
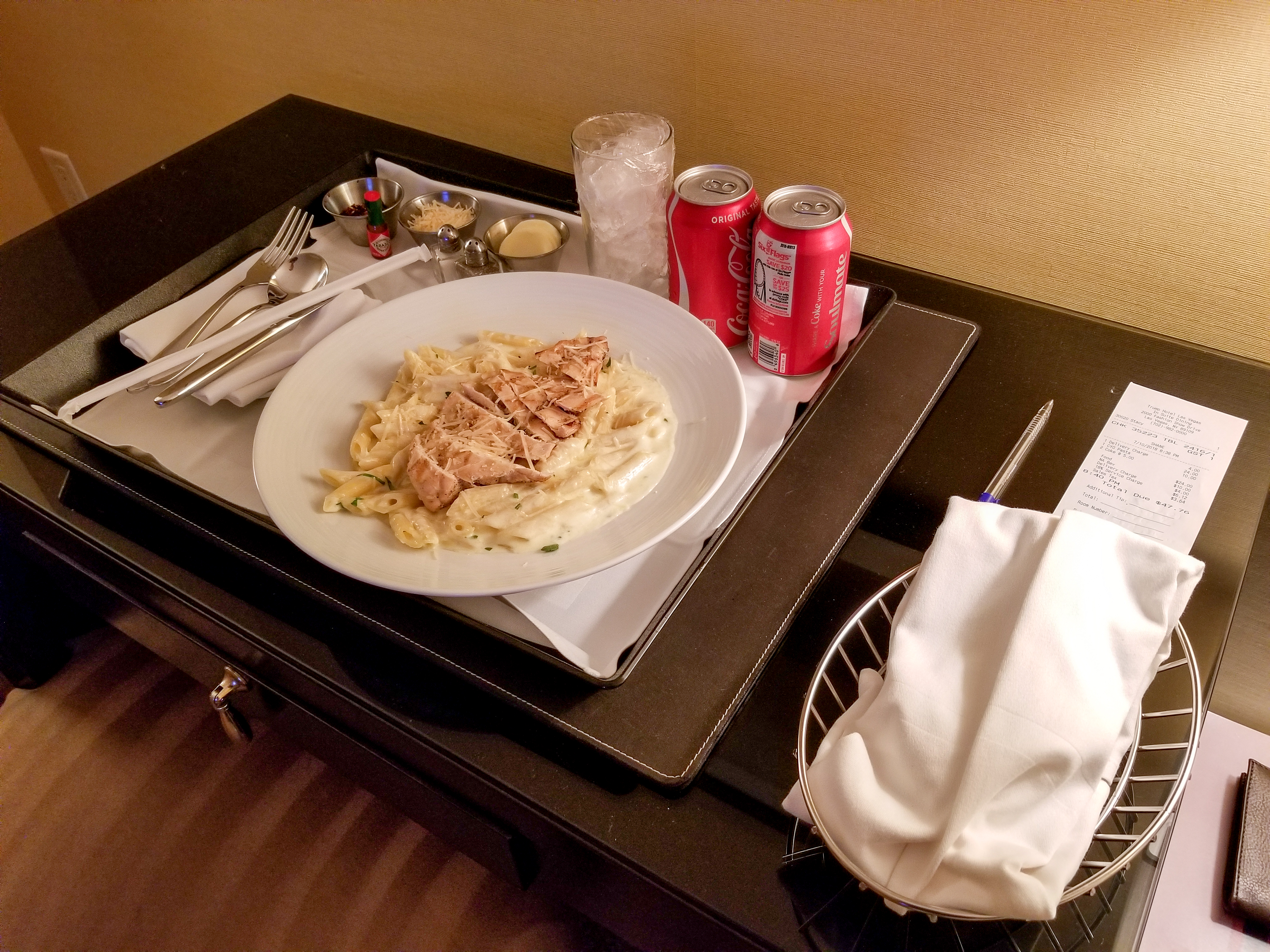
Trump Hotel dinner room service

Room service offers convenience and flexibility, allowing guests to eat and drink within their own private room in the hotel. Guests can order meals whenever they want, and also save time by having meals delivered to their rooms. They can remain in casual wear while eating. Celebrities and those holding private meetings can avoid attention during meals. Room service might have additional services; morning drink is a popular one. However, food and drinks tend to be much more expensive. Logistics also limit the menus. They are often limited to those that can be cooked by staff on different shifts. Hot food can become cold before delivery to the room. Although room service can reduce food wastage, the guest may also be less likely to experience local food options, and they cannot observe the food being prepared either.

=== Hospital room service ===
Some hospitals have started to provide room service for their patients' convenience. Patients are able to order the food of their choice from a menu at a time that is suitable for them. Hospital staff may need to assist patients to ensure that they comply with their dietary restrictions.

Hospital room service offers several benefits for guests and staff. It can improve patient satisfaction and cater to individual preferences and needs. Fresher food is provided with better quality and temperature. This also reduces waste from additional meal trays and unwanted food plates. Hospitals can generate additional revenue by serving family members and visitors.
