= Tune Hotels =

Malaysian hotel company

Tune Hotels ட்யூன் ஹோட்டல்
- Type: Private company
- Industry: Hospitality
- Founder: Tony Fernandes
- Headquarters: Petaling Jaya, Selangor, Malaysia
- Number of locations: 9 (2024)
- Key people: Mark Lankester, Group CEO
- Products: Hotels
- Owner: Tune Group
- Website: www.tunehotels.com

Tune Hotels, legally incorporated as Tune Hotels Management Sdn Bhd, is a limited service hotel chain and part of the Tune Group, the private investment group of Tan Sri Tony Fernandes, founder and group CEO of low-cost airline AirAsia.

== Concept ==
The limited service model used by Tune Hotels is similar to the no frills business model practised by low-cost carriers such as AirAsia and has been adapted to the hospitality industry. Similar concepts includes easyHotel by the easyGroup.

== Properties ==
As of 2024, Tune Hotels operates eight locations in Malaysia and one in Liverpool in the United Kingdom.

== See also ==
- Red Planet Hotels
