= Tony Fernandes =

Malaysian entrepreneur (born 1964)

Yang Berbahagia Tan Sri Dato' Sri (Dr) Tony Fernandes PSM SSAP SPMP DPTJ CBE
- Fernandes in 2026
- Born: Anthony Francis Fernandes; 30 April 1964 (age 62); Kuala Lumpur, Malaysia
- Education: London School of Economics (BAcc)
- Occupation: Entrepreneur
- Years active: 1987–present
- Title: Executive Director & CEO of AirAsia; Founder of Tune Group; Chairman of Petaling Jaya Rangers F.C.
- Spouses: Deborah Lee Bergstrom (m. 1994; sep. 2004) Chloe Kim (m. 2017)
- Children: 3

Tan Sri Dato' Sri Anthony Francis Fernandes (born 30 April 1964) is a Malaysian entrepreneur. He is the founder of Tune Air Sdn. Bhd., which took over the first Malaysian budget airline, AirAsia. Fernandes turned AirAsia, a failing government-linked commercial airline, into a highly successful budget airline public-listed company. He has since founded the Tune Group of companies. Until 2021, he was the owner of Caterham Group, the parent company of British car manufacturer Caterham Cars. Until July 2023, he was the majority shareholder of Queens Park Rangers F.C.

== Early life and education ==
Fernandes was born in Kuala Lumpur on 30 April 1964 to an Indian father (originally from Goa) and a mother of mixed Indian (Malayalis) and Asian-Portuguese (Kristang) descent who had been raised in Malacca, Malaysia. At a young age, he would follow his mother who sold Tupperware at Tupperware parties.

Fernandes was educated at The Alice Smith School in Kuala Lumpur. Starting at age 12, from 1976 to 1983, he studied at Epsom College boarding school in England. He matriculated to the London School of Economics and graduated with a degree in accounting.

== Career ==
Fernandes worked very briefly with Virgin Atlantic as an auditor, subsequently becoming the financial controller for Richard Branson's Virgin Communications in London from 1987 to 1989 before he joined Warner Music International London as Senior Financial Analyst.

Fernandes was admitted as an associate member of the Association of Chartered Certified Accountants (ACCA) in 1991 and became Fellow in 1996. He is currently a member of the Institute of Chartered Accountants in England and Wales (ICAEW).

Fernandes was formerly a Warner Music executive in Malaysia, and Vice President, ASEAN at Warner Music South East Asia from December 1999 to July 2001. When Time Warner (later WarnerMedia; now Warner Bros. Discovery) announced its merger with America Online, Fernandes left the company to pursue his dream of starting a budget no-frills airline.

=== AirAsia ===
It was through the late Datuk Pahamin A. Rajab, the former secretary-general of the Malaysian Domestic Trade and Consumer Affairs Ministry that Fernandes came to meet with then Prime Minister, Tun Dr. Mahathir Mohamad in October 2001. Instead of starting from scratch, Mahathir advised Fernandes to buy an existing airline. AirAsia, the heavily indebted subsidiary of the Malaysian government-owned conglomerate, DRB-Hicom, was then losing money. Fernandes mortgaged his home and used his personal savings to acquire the company, comprising two Boeing 737-300 jet aircraft and debts of US$11 million (RM40 million), for one ringgit (about 26 US cents). One year after his takeover, AirAsia had broken even and cleared all its debts. Its initial public offering (IPO) in November 2004 was oversubscribed by 130 per cent.

Fernandes attributes the success of AirAsia partly to timing. After the 11 September 2001 attacks at New York City and Washington, D.C., aircraft leasing costs fell 40%. Also, airline lay-offs meant experienced staff were readily available. He believed Malaysian travellers would embrace a cut-rate air service that would save them time and money, especially in a tight economy. Fernandes estimates about 50 per cent of the travellers on Asia's budget airlines are first-time flyers. Before the advent of AirAsia, he estimated that only six per cent of Malaysians had ever travelled by air.

Fernandes was also instrumental in lobbying the then-Malaysian Prime Minister Dr. Mahathir Mohamad in mid-2003, to propose the idea of open skies agreements with neighbouring Thailand, Indonesia, and Singapore. As a result, these nations granted landing rights to AirAsia and other discount carriers.

In Thailand and Indonesia, AirAsia holds a minority stake in the respective local companies. Thai AirAsia, a joint venture with Shin Corporation, Thailand's largest telecommunication conglomerate, took to the skies in Feb 2004 and has to-date carried over 1 million passengers in its first year of operations. PT Awair, re-launched as a low-fare airline on 8 December 2004 and subsequently renamed Indonesia AirAsia, presently serves 5 domestic destinations in Indonesia.

In 2018, Fernandes announced that more low-cost carrier terminals would be developed, and confirmed that while AirAsia needed new planes, he had not yet decided on an aircraft manufacturer. Fernandes’ plans to expand include bidding on the operations and maintenance contract for Clark International Airport in the Philippines.

In February 2020, Fernandes stepped aside as CEO of AirAsia as Airbus bribery allegations were probed. A month later, Fernandes was reinstated as CEO of AirAsia after the Airbus bribery allegations probe was cleared by Britain's Serious Fraud Office of any wrongdoing.

=== Other ventures ===
In 2007, Fernandes started a hotel chain, Tune Hotels, based on the no frills concept. It has properties in Britain, Australia and the Far East.

In 2011, Fernandes launched the grocery product EQ8 Energy Drink.

In March 2012, Fernandes served on the International Advisory Board of Global March to Jerusalem, which aims to "mobilize the international community in solidarity with Palestinians and to protect Jerusalem." A joint statement was issued, signed by the various members of the Board, including Fernandes.

In 2013, Fernandes hosted the first season of The Apprentice Asia, the Asian spin-off of the reality game show The Apprentice, in which a group of aspiring young businesspeople compete for the chance to work with Fernandes. However, his role will be replaced by founder, chairman, and CEO of ONE Championship, Chatri Sityodtong for the second season in 2021.

In 2017, Fernandes launches his first memoir, Flying High, published by Penguin Books.

In 2018, Fernandes was named the head of Malaysia Stadium Corporation (MSC) by the Malaysian Youth and Sports Ministry.

In 2020, Fernandes ventured to food delivery as COVID-19 has hit hard on Air Asia.

==== Caterham Group ====
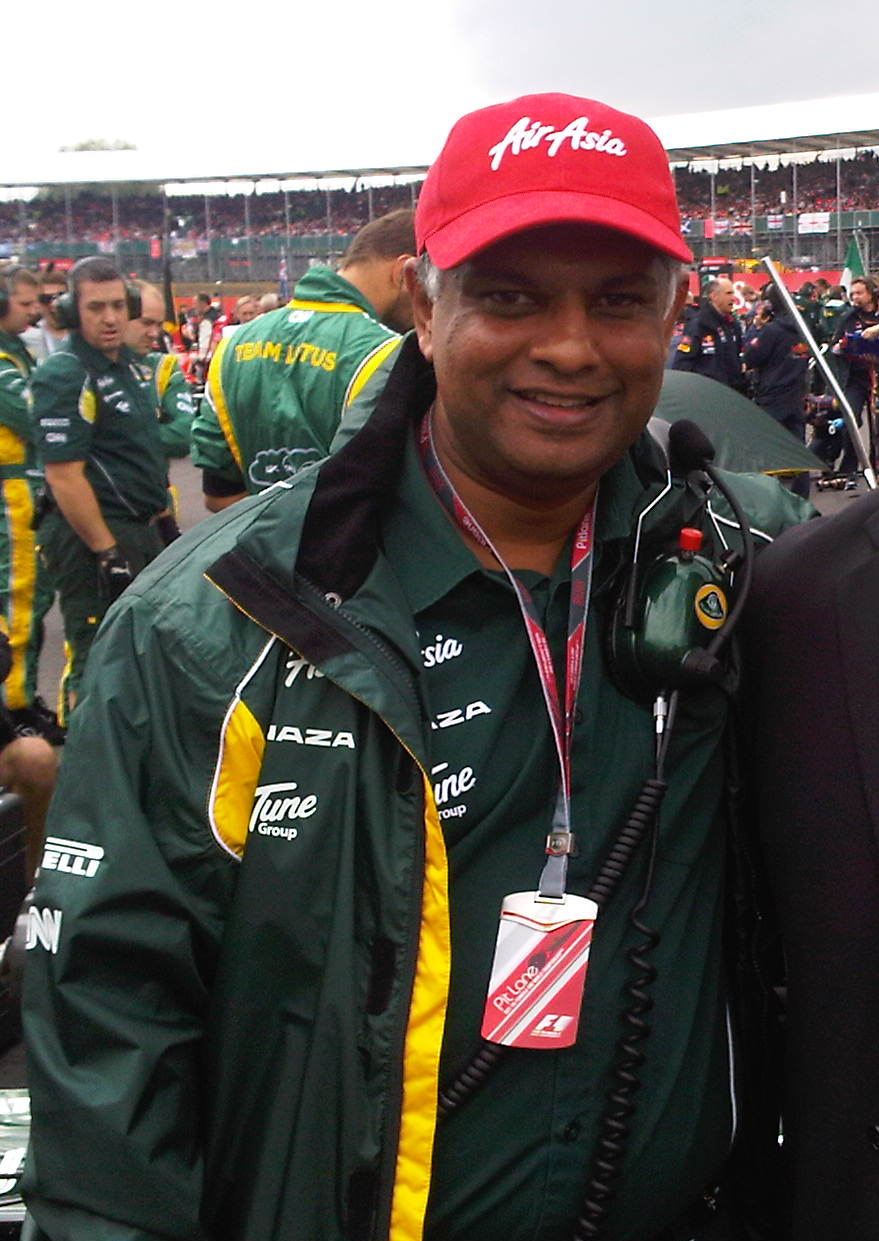
Fernandes at the 2011 British Grand Prix

Fernandes is the founder of the Caterham F1 Formula One team, which began racing in 2010 as Lotus Racing and raced in 2011 as Team Lotus. On 2 July 2014, Caterham F1 was sold to a Swiss and Middle Eastern consortium.

On 16 December 2009, Fernandes accepted a "challenge" from Richard Branson, a fellow airline boss and the owner of Lotus' fellow F1 newcomers Virgin Racing. The losing team's boss would work on the winner's airline for a day dressed as a steward. Branson lost. Fernandes' team produced a poster depicting Branson in an Air Asia uniform. However, the date of the flight was delayed several times: first because of Branson breaking his leg, then because of the royal wedding, and later because of a fire at the Necker Island. On 19 December 2012, Fernandes announced that Branson would honour his bet in May 2013. Branson ultimately honoured the bet on 13 May 2013.

Caterham Racing, also created by Fernandes, competed in the GP2 Series. In October 2014, Tony Fernandes sold the team to Teddy Yip Jr. and he relocated it to Silverstone to merge with Status Grand Prix.

On 27 April 2011, Fernandes announced that his company had purchased Caterham Cars.

==== Football ====
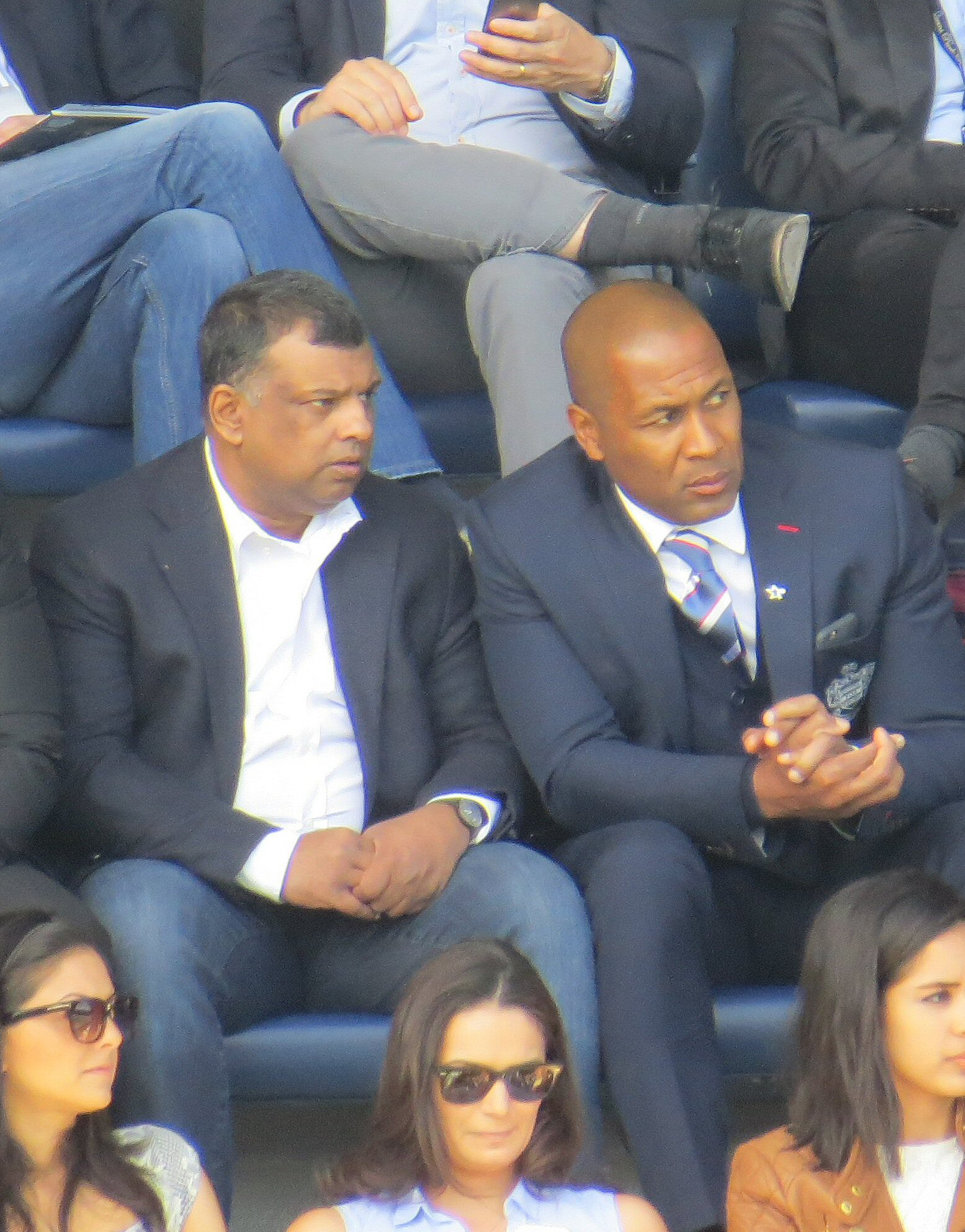
Tony Fernandes watching QPR v Newcastle alongside Les Ferdinand at Loftus Road, May 2015

Fernandes is a fan of English club West Ham United and was involved in talks regarding a potential takeover of the club in May 2011, at which stage it looked as if he was going to acquire a 51% stake in the club. Former West Ham chairman Andrew Bernhardt even flew to Kuala Lumpur to try and finalise the deal, but the two parties failed to agree on the price. It was just one month later when Fernandes made another offer to buy 51 per cent of the club, although co-owners David Sullivan and David Gold rejected his bid. Sullivan told the Evening Standard: "He wanted 51% of the club for two bob." Sullivan's comments started a war of words on Twitter. "It was a good offer with good money and brought in good people," said Fernandes. "Gold and Sullivan can say whatever they want. I have been a lifelong fan and would have brought good money, good ideas, new people and a new belief. As for PR stunts. Wow. They are always in the press making huge claims. Were we not supposed to be in Europe. Now we have been relegated. Two sacked managers. All good players will be sold. No new training ground which is the most important ingredient I feel. Look at how many injuries we have. And more investment into the academy."

On 18 August 2011, just three months after Queens Park Rangers' promotion back to the Premier League following a 15-year absence, Fernandes was unveiled as their majority shareholder, having bought Bernie Ecclestone's 66% stake. He was also named as chairman of QPR Holdings Ltd.

Everyone knows I've followed West Ham all my life but I've always had a soft spot for QPR. Rangers were one of the first teams I watched as a child at Loftus Road. I've always wanted to be involved in football and the appeal of a London club, like QPR, was too good an opportunity to turn down.

— Tony Fernandes, August 2011

While Neil Warnock remained as the club's manager for their return to the top-flight, a run of eight Premier League games without a win eventually led to his sacking. Mark Hughes was quickly named as his replacement, signing a two-and-a-half-year deal in the process. Despite their new manager, QPR's poor run of form continued, which left them fighting for Premier League survival on the final day of the 2011–2012 season. Relegation rivals Bolton Wanderers needed a win to have any chance of survival, but could only muster a draw with Stoke City, meaning QPR were safe, despite losing 3–2 to Manchester City after Sergio Agüero's injury-time winner – a goal which stole the Premier League title from arch-rivals Manchester United on goal difference.

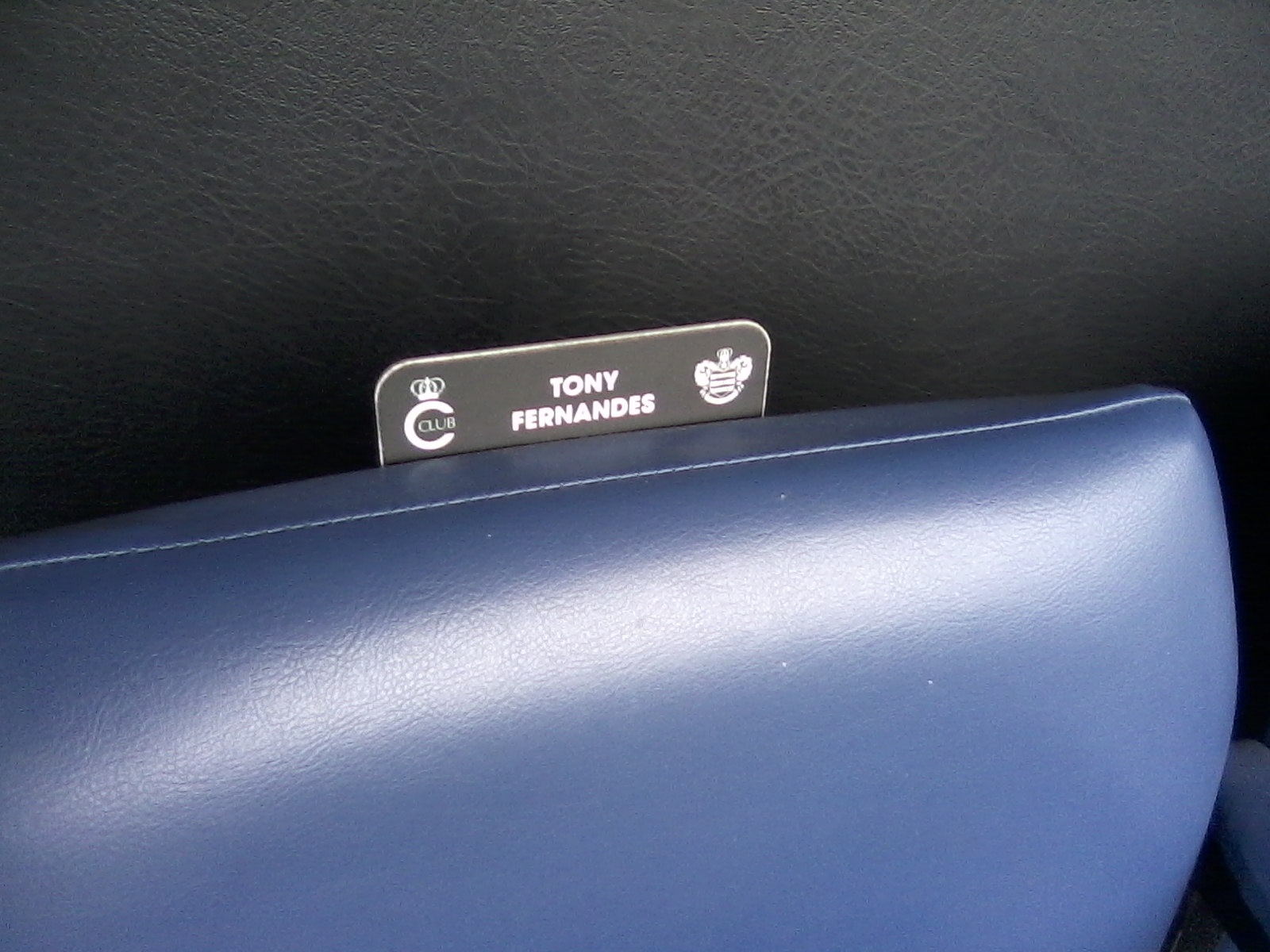
Tony Fernandes' seat at Loftus Road

Mark Hughes led the club into the 2012–2013 season, but after just four points from 12 games and without a single win – one of the worst starts in Premier League history – Fernandes dismissed Hughes. Fernandes hired former Tottenham Hotspur manager Harry Redknapp on 24 November 2012, but he was also unable to solve QPR's problems. Following a goalless draw with relegation rivals Reading on 28 April 2013, both teams were relegated to the Championship.

Speaking to the media just one week after Rangers' relegation back to the Championship, Fernandes said he had been exploited since he took over at Loftus Road. After investing an estimated £50 million into the club, he said: "I don't think I will be exploited any more. I think I allowed myself to be exploited but that's my choice. Agents are trying to get the best contracts and there are no two ways about it, I had to pay premiums. I've seen all of the parts that make football quite - maybe immoral is a strong word - but they would sell their grandmother to do something. It's all part of the football ecosystem."

In 2013, Fernandes said in an interview that he would leave the club if he was unable to "fix" their problems. In a 2017 interview, after a year in the Premier league in 2014-15 and three years relegated to the Championship league from 2015 to 2018, Fernandes admitted having made several mistakes, but also noted that much had been achieved. He restored the former QPR badge and colours and engaged more with the community near Loftus Road. In August 2018, Fernandes said that his tenure was “fast coming to a close”. He planned to step down and hand over the position of co-chairman to vice chairman Amit Bhatia, a change finalised on 15 August 2018.

On 10 July 2023, it was announced that Fernandes no longer held any shares in QPR's holding company, QPR Holdings Limited, and would no longer have involvement in the club.

== Personal life ==
Fernandes was previously married to Deborah Lee Bergstrom on 1 June 1994 and separated in 2004. They had two children, Stephanie and Stephen.

On 14 October 2017, Fernandes married a South Korean actress, Chloe Kim, at Hotel Cap Estel, in Èze on the French Riviera after having dated her for more than two years. On 3 October 2021, he announced on his LinkedIn that his third child, Aliyah Ena Fernandes and was born on 14 August 2021.

Fernandes is also an Overseas Citizen of India, owing to his partial Indian ancestry.

Fernandes revealed in a separate interview with The Nut Graph in November 2009 and with Free Malaysia Today in September 2016 that he does not speak Malay, while stating that he can understand the language, but he can't speak it very well.

As of 2020, Forbes valued Fernandes' net worth at US$335 million, dropping from US$650 million that rank him at number 28 on the Forbes list of Malaysia's Richest in February 2014 then. In November 2020, he sold an Ayrshire estate in Scotland for £2.5 million (S$4.45 million), as the COVID-19 pandemic has taken a toll on airlines worldwide.

== Honours and awards ==
=== Honours of Malaysia ===
- Malaysia
  - Commander of the Order of Loyalty to the Crown of Malaysia (PSM) – Tan Sri (2011)
- Negeri Sembilan
  - Knight Commander of the Grand Order of Tuanku Jaafar (DPTJ) – Dato' (2005)
- Pahang
  - Knight Companion of the Order of Sultan Ahmad Shah of Pahang (DSAP) – Dato' (2007)
  - Grand Knight of the Order of Sultan Ahmad Shah of Pahang (SSAP) – Dato' Sri (2007)
- Perak
  - Knight Grand Commander of the Order of the Perak State Crown (SPMP) – Dato' Seri (2011)

=== Foreign honours ===
- France
  - Commander of the National Order of the Legion of Honour (2017)
- United Kingdom
  - Commander of the Order of the British Empire (CBE) (2011)

=== Honorary degrees ===
- Cambodia
  - Honorary Doctorate in Management from University of Cambodia - (Dr.) (2017)
- Malaysia
  - Honorary Doctorate in Business Innovation from University of Technology Malaysia - (Dr.) (2010)
  - Honorary Doctorate from Binary University - (Dr.) (2014)
  - Honorary Doctorate in Corporate Leadership from MAHSA University - (Dr.) (2017)
  - Honorary Doctorate in Management from University of Putra Malaysia - (Dr.) (2019)
- United Kingdom
  - Honorary Doctorate from Cranfield University - (Dr.) (2018)

=== Awards ===
- International Herald Tribune Award for the "Visionaries & Leadership Series", for his outstanding work in AirAsia
- "Malaysian CEO of the Year 2003" in December 2003; so far awarded to only nine other recipients in the country, by American Express and Business Times. The award was an initiative to recognise entrepreneurial and managerial expertise and performance among leaders of Malaysian corporations.
- Named the joint winner of the CEO of the Year 2003 award by American Express Corporate Services and Business Times
- "Emerging Entrepreneur of the Year" in the Ernst & Young "Entrepreneur Of The Year Awards" in 2003
- Made the list of Business Week's "25 Stars of Asia" in 2005
- Malaysian Ernst & Young "Entrepreneur of the Year 2006"
- "Excellence In Leadership - Asia Pacific Leadership Awards 2009"
- 2010 Forbes Asia businessman of the year
- 2011 No. 52 in FastCompany's Top 100 Most Creative People in Business
- "Brand Builder of the Year" 2014 at the World Branding Awards, for his work in building the AirAsia brand
